= Matthew 28:9 =

- ← 28:8 28:10 →
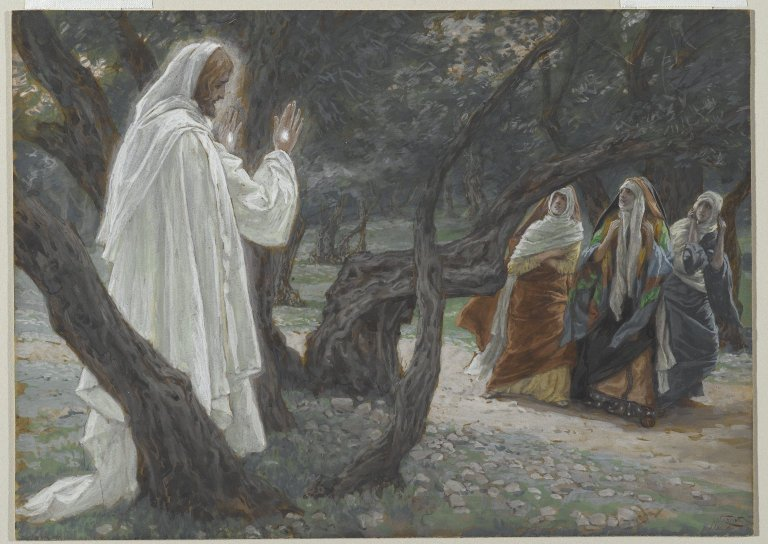
- Jesus Appears to the Holy Women, by James Tissot
- Book: Gospel of Matthew
- Christian Bible part: New Testament

Matthew 28:9 is the ninth verse of the twenty-eighth chapter of the Gospel of Matthew in the New Testament. This verse is part of the resurrection narrative. Mary Magdalene and "the other Mary" are leaving the empty tomb of Jesus after encountering an angel, and in this verse they encounter the risen Jesus.

== Content ==
The Textus Receptus reads

ως δε επορευοντο απαγγειλαι τοις μαθηταις αυτου και ιδου ο ιησους απηντησεν αυταις λεγων χαιρετε αι δε προσελθουσαι εκρατησαν αυτου τους ποδας και προσεκυνησαν αυτω.

The critical text adopted by Westcott and Hort omits ως δε επορευοντο απαγγειλαι τοις μαθηταις αυτου, reading:

και ιδου ιησους υπηντησεν αυταις λεγων χαιρετε αι δε προσελθουσαι
εκρατησαν αυτου τους ποδας και προσεκυνησαν αυτω

In the King James Version of the Bible it is translated as:

And as they went to tell his disciples, behold, Jesus met them, saying,
All hail. And they came and held him by the feet, and worshipped him.

The New International Version omits the words about the women telling the disciples, in line with the text omitted in Westcott and Hort's text above.

The modern World English Bible translates the passage as:

As they went to tell his disciples, behold, Jesus met them, saying,
"Rejoice!" They came and took hold of his feet, and worshiped him. (Note: For a collection of other versions see BibleHub: Matthew 28:9)

== Analysis ==
At this verse Matthew diverges from Mark, and many scholars believe that the author of Matthew was not working from the ending of Mark 16 that exists in the current Bible. Mark and John do both have versions of this meeting between Jesus and Mary Magdalene. John Nolland believes that in this case Mark may be derived from Matthew, while John is independent. David Hill notes that the three verse section which begins here is a partial doublet for the conversation with the angel at Matthew 28:5-7. This appearance is excluded from Luke's account and also from Paul's list of Jesus' appearances in 1 Corinthians. France argues that the invalidity of female witnesses in this period could be the reason Luke and Paul left out this event.

This is the only verse in the entire New Testament where Jesus meets someone: in other passages it is always someone else meeting Jesus. Nolland sees this as a distinct privilege for the women. The women then come to Jesus, as is the standard in the gospels, though later at Matthew 28:16 that pattern will also be broken when Jesus comes to the disciples.

The word Jesus uses to greet the women translates as either "good morning" or "rejoice". It was the standard Greek greeting used at this time, and is thus comparable to the modern hello. France notes the contrast between this humble greeting of Jesus' with the elevated language of the angel at Matthew 28:5-6. Jesus has previously used this same greeting in Matthew for Judas at 26:49 and for the Roman soldiers, and Nolland writes that its return here redeems the expression after its previous occurrences. In John's version of this scene at John 20:19-26, Jesus uses the word "peace" as a greeting. This is a translation of the standard Hebrew/Aramaic greeting.

The women have no problem recognizing Jesus after the resurrection as at Luke 24:16 and John 20:14. There is also no sign of any doubt on the women's part as found at Matthew 28:17, and in the other gospels.

The women fall at Jesus' feet. This is a sign of worship and supplication both in contemporary non-Christian literature, and also elsewhere in the New Testament: Jesus' feet are anointed at Luke 7:38, John 11:2, and John 12:3. To Nolland this behaviour serves to show that the women have a new understanding of Jesus' divinity after the encounter with the angel and his appearance. Touching his feet also serves as tangible evidence of Jesus' physicality, and a rejection of docetism. Docetism is not believed to have been a current debate at the time Matthew was written, and France believes that this verse is not written in a manner to counter that belief. Its evidence for Jesus' physicality is incidental rather than deliberate. Davies and Allison note that in folklore of the period ghosts were described as not having feet, so this reference to Jesus' feet might be to counter the belief that Jesus is a ghost rather than fully resurrected.

== Notes ==
Preceded by Matthew 28:8	Gospel of Matthew; Chapter 28	Succeeded by Matthew 28:10
