= Matthew 28:10 =

- ← 28:9 28:11 →
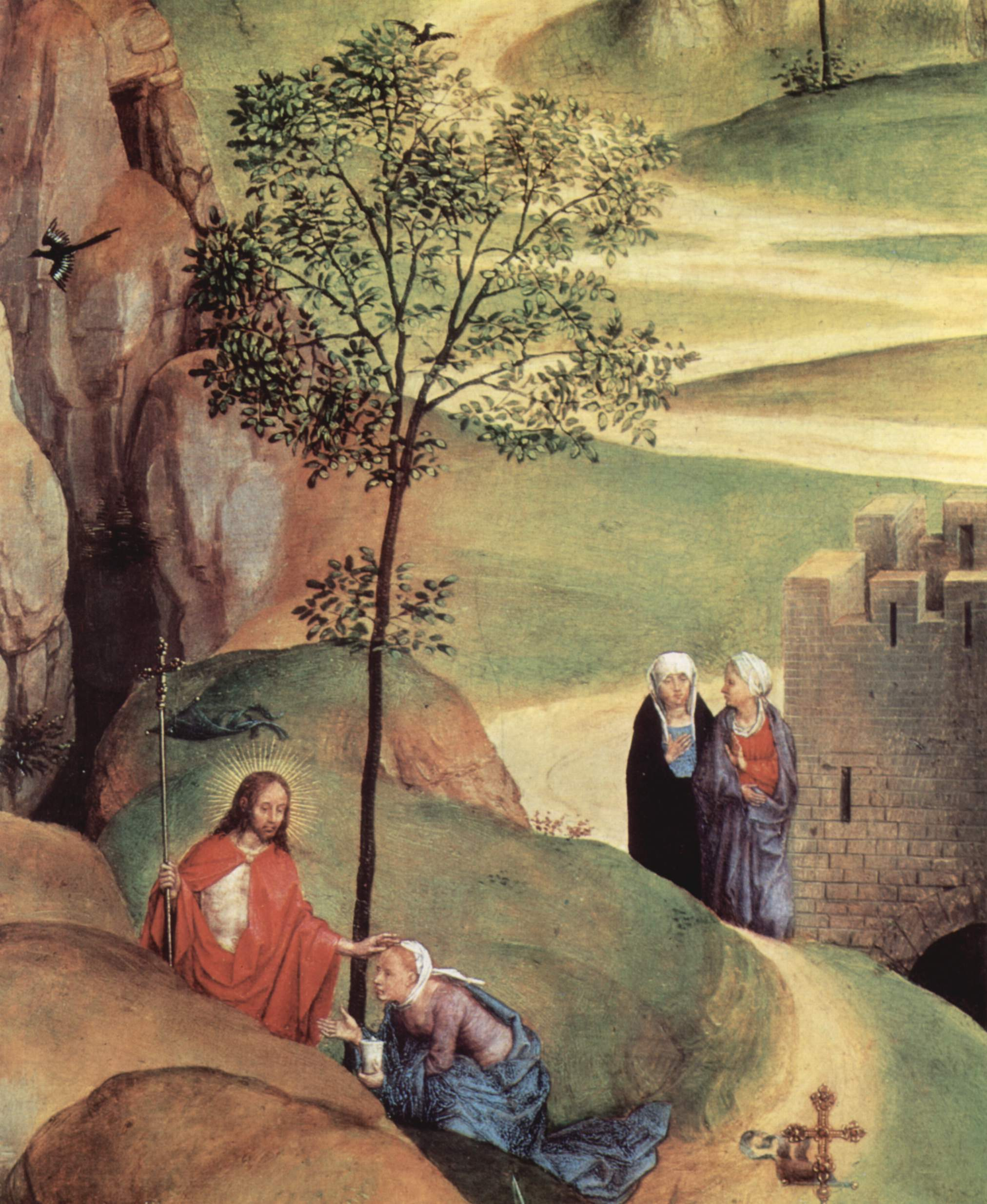
- A depiction of the women and Jesus by Hans Memling. The two women hanging back are an attempt to reconcile the different gospels with their differing number of women at the resurrection scene.
- Book: Gospel of Matthew
- Christian Bible part: New Testament

Matthew 28:10 is the tenth verse of the twenty-eighth chapter in the Gospel of Matthew in the New Testament. This verse is part of the resurrection narrative. Having left the empty tomb, Mary Magdalene and "the other Mary" are on their way to meet the other disciples, when Jesus meets with them. In this verse the risen Jesus speaks with them.

== Content ==
The original Koine Greek, according to Westcott and Hort, reads:

τοτε λεγει αυταις ο ιησους μη φοβεισθε υπαγετε απαγγειλατε τοις
αδελφοις μου ινα απελθωσιν εις την γαλιλαιαν κακει με οψονται

In the King James Version of the Bible it is translated as:

Then said Jesus unto them, Be not afraid: go tell my brethren
that they go into Galilee, and there shall they see me.

The modern World English Bible translates the passage as:

Then Jesus said to them, "Don’t be afraid. Go tell my brothers
that they should go into Galilee, and there they will see me." (Note: For a collection of other versions see BibleHub: Matthew 28:10.)

== Analysis ==
This verse is very similar to Matthew 28:7, with the deliverer changed from an angel to Jesus. This verse might be a creation of the author of Matthew, derived from 28:7. The phrase "to my brothers" is very unusual and also appears at John 20:17; John Nolland suggests that there may be shared source used by the two evangelists. Jerome correlates Jesus' direction to the disciples, "Tell my brothers (nuntiate fratribus meis)" to meet Jesus in Galilee with Psalm 22:22: "I will tell forth (Adnuntiabo) your name to my brothers (fratribus meis)."

No new information is included in this message that was not present at 28:7. Nolland notes that the importance is not the message, but rather who gives it. Jesus here serves as the second witness providing proof of the resurrection. The verse is not an exact copy of verse 7: Nolland considers the changes simply alterations to prevent the reader getting bored by an exact repetition of the earlier line, but R.T. France disagrees, and considers calling the disciples "brothers" and the direct command to go to Galilee to be important differences from 28:7. Robert Gundry agrees that there is no new content in this verse, but he disagrees that this is a creation of Matthew based on the angel scene. Rather he argues that this content comes originally from a now lost ending to Mark 16. While the Gospel of Matthew has no need for this passage, Gundry believes Mark could not have ended at 8, with the women silent about what they had seen. A second event would need to occur to break their silence, and Gundry feels that this section of Matthew is based on that content.

Nolland considers the "to my brothers" to be a "striking innovation". It shows that Jesus stands with the disciples, even though they deserted him, and shows that Jesus considers the relationship unruptured by the events of the crucifixion. Schweizer notes that in the original Greek, the word translated as brothers is gender neutral and can refer to both Jesus' male and female followers. Jesus has referred to brothers several other times in Matthew, notably at 12:46, 12:49, 12:55, and 28:16

Jesus' words conclude, anticipating a resurrection appearance in Galilee, which is fulfilled in verses 18–20. This is the final mention of the women in the gospel, and there is no report of the message being delivered. That the disciples are present in Galilee, at Matthew 28:16, indicates that the message was delivered. Heinrich Meyer argues that this was to be the first appearance to the eleven disciples in this gospel, not subsequent to the Jerusalem appearances reported by Luke and John, and therefore supports the view that this gospel has adopted a Galilean tradition in regard to Jesus' appearances. Meyer further argues that the omission of the Judean appearances would not have been the intention of Matthew himself and therefore that this is one "of [the] passages in our Gospel which show traces of other than apostolic authorship".

== Sources ==
- Tkacz, Catherine Brown, "Esther, Jesus, and Psalm 22", The Catholic Biblical Quarterly Vol. 70, No. 4 (October 2008), pp. 709–728.

Preceded by Matthew 28:9	Gospel of Matthew; Chapter 28	Succeeded by Matthew 28:11
