= Matthew 28:12 =

- ← 28:11 28:13 →
- Book: Gospel of Matthew
- Christian Bible part: New Testament

Matthew 28:12 is the twelfth verse of the twenty-eighth chapter of the Gospel of Matthew in the New Testament. This verse is part of the resurrection narrative. In this verse the guards of the tomb, after being present for an angel hearkening the resurrection, are bribed by the priests to lie about what they saw.

== Content ==
The text in Koine Greek, according to Westcott and Hort, reads:

και συναχθεντες μετα των πρεσβυτερων συμβουλιον τε
λαβοντες αργυρια ικανα εδωκαν τοις στρατιωταις

In the King James Version of the Bible it is translated as:

And when they were assembled with the elders, and had
taken counsel, they gave large money unto the soldiers,

The modern World English Bible translates the passage as:

When they were assembled with the elders, and had taken
counsel, they gave a large amount of silver to the soldiers, (Note: For a collection of other versions see BibleHub: Matthew 28:12)

== Analysis ==
Francis Beare notes that the phrasing could indicate that the priests call the Sanhedrin, the Jewish ruling council, into session to address the matter. This links back to Matthew 2 where the gentile Magi arrive in Jerusalem, and report on their belief in the newborn Jesus. In that section the Jewish leadership meets in consternation, and Herod decides to try and kill the child. In this section the gentile guards report to the Jewish leaders, and the leaders decide to dissemble to prevent the story of Jesus' resurrection from being known. Robert Gundry notes that this removes any thoughts that the leaders were simply ignorant of the events: according to the Gospel of Matthew they were fully informed and chose to disbelieve. Unlike Matthew 27:62, the Pharisees are not mentioned as being present, though their presence is likely implied by their previous attendance at such gatherings.

Schweizer notes that money only appears three times in the gospel, here, during the betrayal of Judas, and in the parable of the three servants. There are clear parallels between the betrayal of Judas and the bribing of the guards, Nolland states that Judas was bought for what he knew, and the guards are bought to hide what they know. Gundry notes that the mentions of money might indicate a special interest in the subject of the author of Matthew, who is traditionally believed to have been a tax collector. The literal meaning of the verse is a "sufficient" amount of money.

Accepting bribes and betraying generals was a common event in the Near Eastern empires of the time, but was much less common among the Roman forces, where if caught the punishments would be very severe. Gundry notes that the largeness of the sum indicates how important it was to the priests to keep the guards' secret, and that the guards would demand a large sum for a lie that would put them in jeopardy, as Matthew 28:14 indicates. Alexander Jones notes that the guards would also have an interest in covering up the matter, as the supernatural story of what did happen at Matthew 28:2 was not likely to be believed if the matter did come to a court martial.

== Notes ==
Preceded by Matthew 28:11	Gospel of Matthew; Chapter 28	Succeeded by Matthew 28:13
