= Matthew 28 =

- ← chapter 27 Mark 1 →
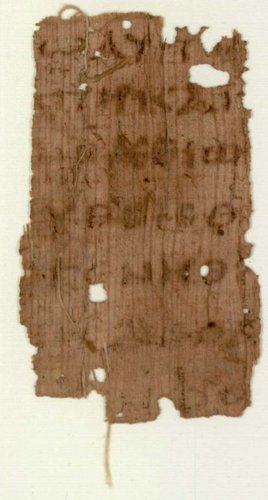
- Gospel of Matthew 28:2–5 on Papyrus 105, from 5th/6th century
- Book: Gospel of Matthew
- Category: Gospel
- Christian Bible part: New Testament
- Order in the Christian part: 1

Matthew 28 is the twenty-eighth and final chapter of the Gospel of Matthew in the New Testament. This chapter records that Jesus is risen, describes the actions of the first witnesses to this event, and ends with the Great Commission.

== Text ==
The original text was written in Koine Greek. This chapter is divided into 20 verses.

=== Textual witnesses ===
Some early manuscripts containing the text of this chapter are:

- Codex Vaticanus (~325–350)
- Codex Sinaiticus (~330–360)
- Codex Bezae (~400)
- Codex Washingtonianus (~400)
- Codex Alexandrinus (~400–440)
- Codex Ephraemi Rescriptus (~450; extant verses 1–14)
- Papyrus 105 (5th/6th century; extant verses 2–5)
- Codex Purpureus Rossanensis (6th century)

=== King James Version ===
1 In the end of the sabbath, as it began to dawn toward the first day of the week, came Mary Magdalene and the other Mary to see the sepulchre.
2 And, behold, there was a great earthquake: for the angel of the Lord descended from heaven, and came and rolled back the stone from the door, and sat upon it.
3 His countenance was like lightning, and his raiment white as snow:
4 And for fear of him the keepers did shake, and became as dead men.
5 And the angel answered and said unto the women, Fear not ye: for I know that ye seek Jesus, which was crucified.
6 He is not here: for he is risen, as he said. Come, see the place where the Lord lay.
7 And go quickly, and tell his disciples that he is risen from the dead; and, behold, he goeth before you into Galilee; there shall ye see him: lo, I have told you.
8 And they departed quickly from the sepulchre with fear and great joy; and did run to bring his disciples word.
9 And as they went to tell his disciples, behold, Jesus met them, saying, All hail. And they came and held him by the feet, and worshipped him.
10 Then said Jesus unto them, Be not afraid: go tell my brethren that they go into Galilee, and there shall they see me.
11 Now when they were going, behold, some of the watch came into the city, and shewed unto the chief priests all the things that were done.
12 And when they were assembled with the elders, and had taken counsel, they gave large money unto the soldiers,
13 Saying, Say ye, His disciples came by night, and stole him away while we slept.
14 And if this come to the governor's ears, we will persuade him, and secure you.
15 So they took the money, and did as they were taught: and this saying is commonly reported among the Jews until this day.
16 Then the eleven disciples went away into Galilee, into a mountain where Jesus had appointed them.
17 And when they saw him, they worshipped him: but some doubted.
18 And Jesus came and spake unto them, saying, All power is given unto me in heaven and in earth.
19 Go ye therefore, and teach all nations, baptizing them in the name of the Father, and of the Son, and of the Holy Ghost:
20 Teaching them to observe all things whatsoever I have commanded you: and, lo, I am with you always, even unto the end of the world. Amen.

== Overview ==
The first section, verses 1–10, covers the visit of Mary Magdalene and "the other Mary" (Mary, the mother of James and Joses in Matthew 27:56) to the tomb of Jesus. The greek "εις μιαν σαββατων" literally reads "toward [the] first [day] of the sabbath", but is usually translated "first of the week." There an angel descends, opening the tomb and incapacitating the guards. The angel addresses the women, inviting them to see the place where he ("the Lord") had been laid, and to tell Jesus' disciples that he is (or has) risen. As they leave the area, they encounter the risen Jesus.

In the second section, verses 11–15, the guards return to Jerusalem, where they report to the chief priests about the events and the priests bribe the guards to lie about what has happened and tell that the disciples had come and stolen the body.

In the third section, verses 16–20, Jesus appears to the disciples in Galilee and issues the Great Commission ending with a trinitarian formula which is much disputed by modern scholars.

Henry Alford notes that the Ascension of Jesus is not recorded in Matthew's Gospel, but suggests that it is implied in the words "I am with you always", in the final verse.

The Textus Receptus Greek text and the King James Version end verse 20 with the Greek: Ἀμήν, Amen, but the majority of ancient texts and modern English translations do not include this word. The Pulpit Commentary suggests that "the word is here an interpolation".

== Sources ==
Tradition sites of Jesus' tomb
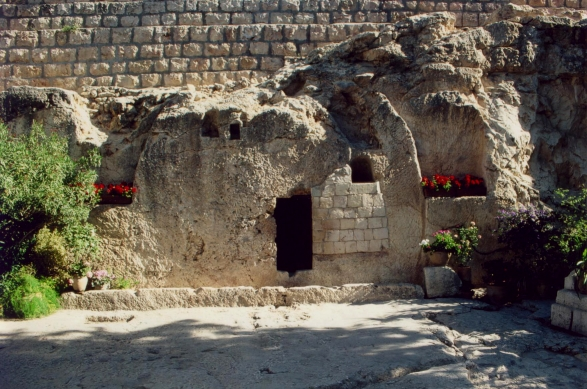
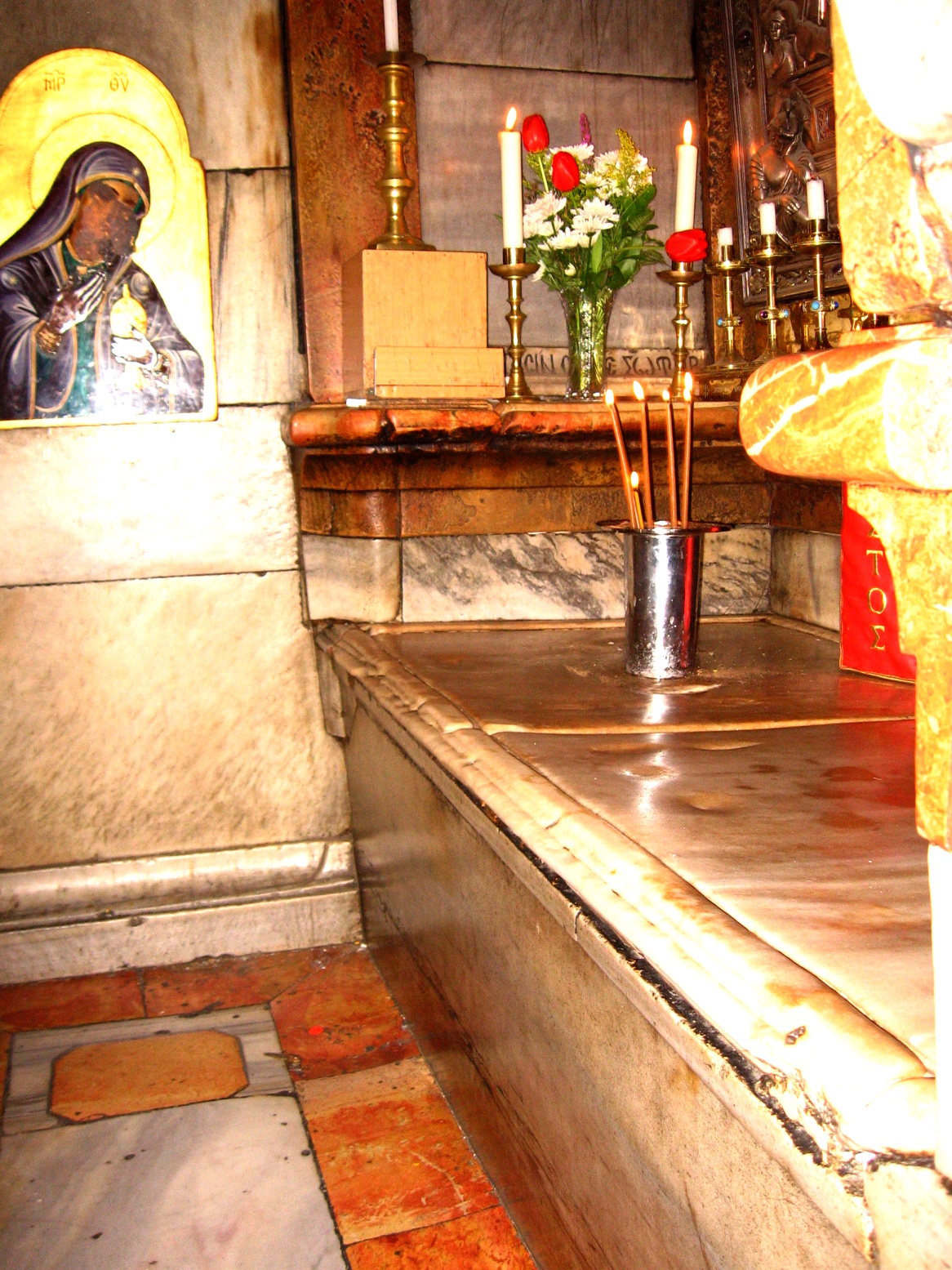
Left: outside of Garden Tomb;
Right: inside of the Church of the Holy Sepulchre

Matthew 28 covers the same material as Mark 16, Luke 24, and John 20 in the other gospels. As with the rest of Matthew it seems clear that Matthew is adapting what appears in Mark. Unusually the material not from Mark most closely matches the Gospel of John, unlike the rest of the gospel where non-Markan material is often matched in Luke. Some scholars thus believe that the authors of Matthew and John may have been working from a shared source on the resurrection that wasn't used by the other two gospel writers. A variation on the appearance of Jesus to the women does occur in John, but the wording is completely different in Matthew. The meeting with Jesus is a close variation on the meeting on the women's meeting with the angel, and may be based on that text originally from Mark.

The report of the guards is wholly unique to Matthew, but is matched with the guards content in Matthew 27. This material is thus a creation of Matthew's author, or based on a source only used by that writer. It also parallels the story of the women and the resurrection. This section is clearly apologetical, meant to address anti-Christian allegations that were current at the time of its writing.

The final meeting of Jesus and the disciples to issue the Great Commission appears in all four gospels, but with much variation. In Luke the meeting occurs in Jerusalem and it is also indicated that is the location in John. Mark does not give a location, but in Matthew it happens in Galilee. While similar to Mark, it is not believed that this section is based on that gospel, as the current ending of Mark 16 is today believed to be a later addition. Some scholars believe that the author of Matthew may have been working from the lost ending of Mark.

== Reception ==
Some early Christian writings appealed to Matthew 28:19. The Didache (7.1), written at the turn of the 1st century, borrows the baptismal Trinitarian formula found in Matthew 28:19. The seventh chapter of the Didache reads "Having first said all these things, baptize into the name of the Father, and of the Son, and of the Holy Spirit".

In addition, Tertullian, writing around the turn of the 2nd century (~200 CE), also cites the baptismal Trinitarian formula from this Matthean passage twice in his writings. In the 26th chapter of his Against Praxeas, arguing against a Unitarian understanding of God, Tertullian cites this formula, writing "He commands them to baptize into the Father and the Son and the Holy Ghost, not into a unipersonal God." In addition, in the 13th chapter of Tertullian's On Baptism, he cites the formula in order to establish the necessity of the practice of baptism, writing "For the law of baptizing has been imposed, and the formula prescribed: "'Go,' He says, 'teach the nations, baptizing them into the name of the Father, and of the Son, and of the Holy Spirit.'"

== Verses ==
- Matthew 28:1
- Matthew 28:2
- Matthew 28:3
- Matthew 28:4
- Matthew 28:5–6
- Matthew 28:7
- Matthew 28:8
- Matthew 28:9
- Matthew 28:10
- Matthew 28:11
- Matthew 28:12
- Matthew 28:13
- Matthew 28:14
- Matthew 28:15
- Matthew 28:16
- Matthew 28:17
- Matthew 28:18
- Matthew 28:19
- Matthew 28:20

== See also ==
- Great Commission
- Holy Week
- Resurrection of Jesus
- Related Bible parts: Mark 16, Luke 24, John 20
