= Matthew 28:8 =

- ← 28:7 28:9 →
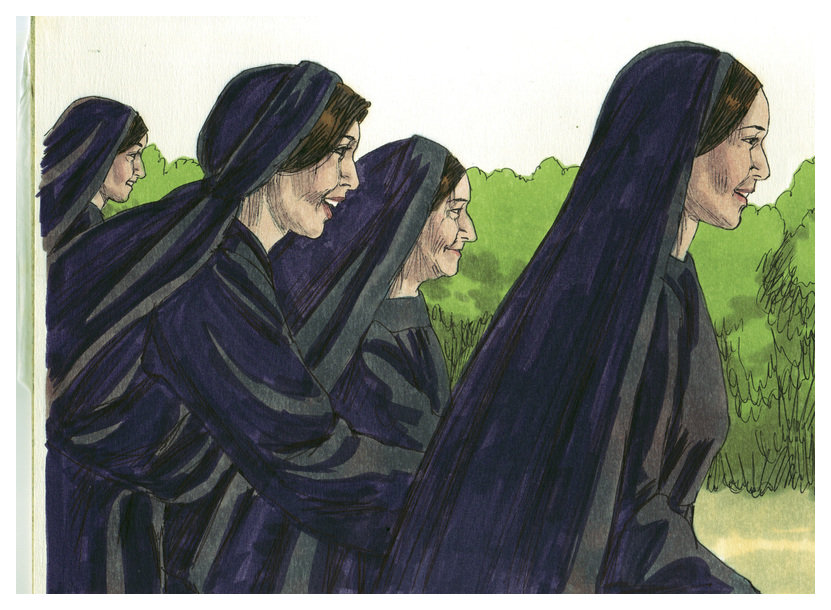
- The women ran with great joy from the grave. Biblical illustration of Gospel of Matthew Chapter 28 by Jim Padgett, courtesy of Sweet Publishing, 1984.
- Book: Gospel of Matthew
- Christian Bible part: New Testament

Matthew 28:8 is the eighth verse of the twenty-eighth chapter of the Gospel of Matthew in the New Testament. This verse is part of the resurrection narrative. Mary Magdalene and "the other Mary" had just encountered an angel who has appeared at the empty tomb of Jesus, and in this verse they leave to bear the angel's message.

== Content ==
The original Koine Greek, according to Westcott and Hort, reads:

και απελθουσαι ταχυ απο του μνημειου μετα φοβου και
χαρας μεγαλης εδραμον απαγγειλαι τοις μαθηταις αυτου

In the King James Version of the Bible it is translated as:

And they departed quickly from the sepulchre with fear
and great joy; and did run to bring his disciples word.

The modern World English Bible translates the passage as:

They departed quickly from the tomb with fear and
great joy, and ran to bring his disciples word. (Note: For a collection of other versions see BibleHub, Matthew 28:8.)

== Analysis ==
This verse is closely based on Mark 16:8, but the author of Matthew makes a number of modifications. Many scholars believe that the verses in Mark 16 after eight are a later addition. There is considerable debate over which version the author of Matthew is working from: our version, a version without the longer ending, or a version with a different ending. In Matthew the meeting with the angel is outside the tomb so Mark's "went out" is changed to "departed".

In Mark the women experience fear, trembling, and terror, unmitigated by joy. In Matthew they still experience fear, but also joy. The only place outside of parables where Matthew mentions joy is at Matthew 2:10, in connection with the Magi, with both using the expression "great joy." Nolland posits that this is another linking between the end of the story and the beginning. Joy is also used in Luke and John to refer to the Easter events, perhaps evidence that it was an element of a lost source used by these three writers.

In Mark the fearful women flee, but in Matthew they merely run. Mark also reports that the women were so frightened that they said nothing. Matthew, and Luke, reverse this and state that the women ran and told the disciples. St. Augustine noticed this contradiction, but reconciled it by arguing that Mark's claim is that the women said nothing to the angel, not the disciples. France also agrees that Mark did not intend the women's silence to be permanent, as it would violate the command to tell the disciples. Since the original ending of Mark, if there was a different one, is now lost it is impossible to know what was meant by the line about the women's silence.

== Sources ==
- Nolland, John (2005). The Gospel of Matthew: a commentary on the Greek text. Wm. B. Eerdmans Publishing.
- Schweizer, Eduard (1975). The Good News According to Matthew. Atlanta: John Knox Press.

| Preceded by Matthew 28:7 | Gospel of Matthew; Chapter 28 | Succeeded by Matthew 28:9 |
