= Matthew 28:18 =

- ← 28:17 28:19 →
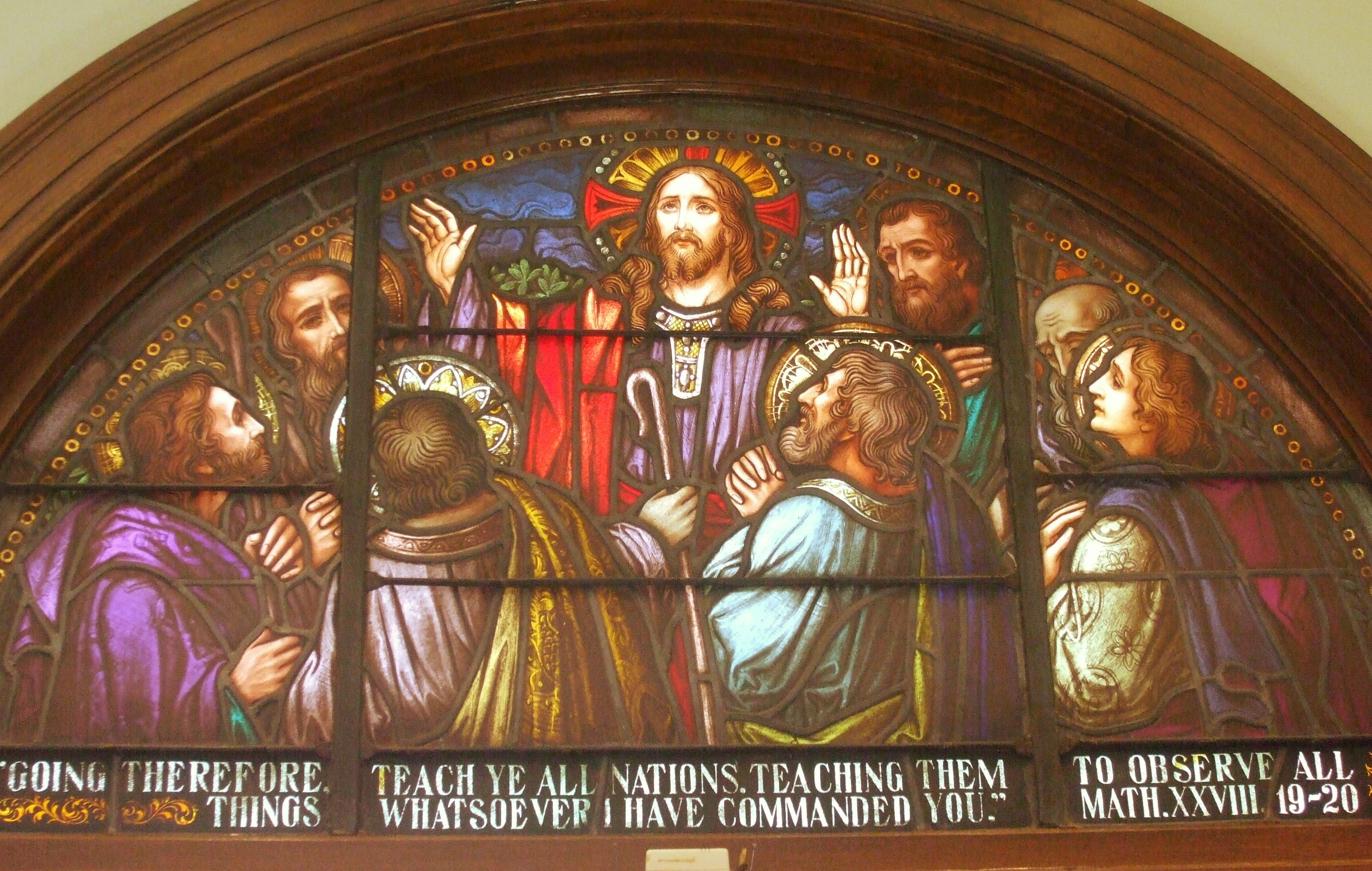
- The Great Commission, stained glass window, Cathedral Parish of Saint Patrick in El Paso, Texas
- Book: Gospel of Matthew
- Christian Bible part: New Testament

Matthew 28:18 is the eighteenth verse of the twenty-eighth chapter of the Gospel of Matthew in the New Testament. This verse is part of the Great Commission narrative, containing the emphatic declaration of Jesus' absolute authority over the universe.

== Content ==
The original Koine Greek, according to Westcott and Hort/[NA27 and UBS4 variants], reads:

18: καὶ προσελθὼν ὁ Ἰησοῦς ἐλάλησεν αὐτοῖς λέγων Ἐδόθη μοι πᾶσα ἐξουσία ἐν οὐρανῷ καὶ ἐπὶ τῆς γῆς·

In the King James Version of the Bible it is translated as:

18: And Jesus came and spake unto them, saying, All power is given unto me in heaven and in earth.

The modern World English Bible translates the passage as:

18: Jesus came to them and spoke to them, saying, "All authority has been given to me in heaven and on earth. (Note: For a collection of other versions see BibleHub: Matthew 28:18)

== Analysis ==
The word "all" (Ancient Greek: πᾶσα, pasa) are found multiple times in the verses 18–20, tying them together: all power/authority, all nations, all things ("that I have commanded you") and all the days ("always").

Dale Allison considers the suggestions of the verse 18 allusion to Daniel 7:13–14 or 2 Chronicles 36:23 improbable. A more persistent correlation with Moses, however, is worthy of consideration, starting with "the mountain", as 'Moses ended his earthly course on a mountain'; the commissioning of Joshua by God through Moses; and the close parallels in Deuteronomy 31:14–15, 23; and Joshua 1:1–9, which are 'all about God'.

The Greek word for "power" is exousia, which refers to 'delegated power or authority along with the right to use it'; not quite adequately translated by the word "power" or "authority" alone. The exousia of Jesus is already stressed previously in the same gospel (Matthew 7:29; 10:1, 7–8; 11:27; 22:43–44; 24:35; cf. John 17:2), so it is not entirely correct to claim that the resurrected Jesus has more authority than the Jesus before the crucifixion. During his ministry, his words, just as God's, will not pass away (Matthew 24:35) and he, like God, forgives sins (Matthew 9:6), but only after the resurrection, his spheres of exercising absolute authority can be said to include all heaven and earth (that is, "the universe"). The authority is given to Jesus by the Father (thus, the Father is exempt from the Son's authority; cf. 1 Corinthians 15:27–28), and the Son becomes "the one through whom all God's authority is mediated (thus, Jesus as the "mediatorial King"). The received "well-defined exercise of authority" is the climactic vindication of Jesus' humiliation (cf. Philippians 2:5–11) and marks a turning point in the redemptive history that the "Messiah's Kingdom" or Jesus' "king-dominion" has risen up in new power: the exercise of Jesus' "divine and saving authority".

== Notes ==
Preceded by Matthew 28:17	Gospel of Matthew; Chapter 28	Succeeded by Matthew 28:19
