= Matthew 28:11 =

- ← 28:10 28:12 →
- Book: Gospel of Matthew
- Christian Bible part: New Testament

Matthew 28:11 is the eleventh verse of the twenty-eighth chapter of the Gospel of Matthew in the New Testament. This verse is part of the resurrection narrative. In this verse some of the guards at the tomb return to Jerusalem to report to the chief priests.

== Content ==
The original Koine Greek, according to Westcott and Hort, reads:

πορευομενων δε αυτων ιδου τινες της κουστωδιας ελθοντες εις
την πολιν απηγγειλαν τοις αρχιερευσιν απαντα τα γενομενα

In the King James Version of the Bible it is translated as:

Now when they were going, behold, some of the watch came into the city,
and shewed unto the chief priests all the things that were done.

The modern World English Bible translates the passage as:

Now while they were going, behold, some of the guards came into the
city, and told the chief priests all the things that had happened. (Note: For a collection of other versions see BibleHub: Matthew 28:11.)

== Analysis ==
In this section the guards appear a third and final time. Nolland notes that the movements of the guards and their presence at the crucifixion and resurrection parallel and contrast the women. The wording of this verse implies that the guards left the tomb at the same time as the women, and this meeting with the priests parallels the meeting of the women with Jesus. While the women and disciples head to Galilee, the guards head to Jerusalem. France sees this as part of a general association of Jerusalem with dark events and deceit that is contrasted with hope and light coming from Galilee throughout the Gospel of Matthew.

This section of Matthew has no parallel in any of the other gospels, though it is clearly based on the same source as the rest of the guard material in Matthew. Davies and Allison note that it is "transparently apologetical." France defends against this section being entirely fictional. He argues that it would be an event with both the Jewish and Roman leaders would know of, and thus could easily disprove if it were false. The guards do not come to report on the resurrection, unlike in the Gospel of Peter, but simply on the fact that the tomb is empty. All involved, including the priests take it as an accepted truth that the tomb is empty. Schweizer has more doubts about this section, wondering how the author of Matthew would be able to relate conversations between the high priests and the Romans with no sympathetic witnesses present.

As with Judas and at Matthew 27:62 it is the chief priests that serve as the main antagonists. Why the guards report to the Jewish leaders rather than to Pontius Pilate is a question in this verse. Reporting to Pilate would be more historically accurate. The apocryphal Gospel of Peter has a version of this scene, but there the guards to report to Pilate. While the chief priests would have had the services of their own Temple guards, the word used to refer to the soldiers in these verses is koustodia, a Latin loan word that clearly indicates their Roman origin. The priests also have to ask Pilate for the services of the guards, indicating there are some of his forces. At Matthew 27:65 Pilate tells the priests that "you have guard." This could indicate that this group of guards was temporarily placed at the command and disposal of the priests and that explains why they report to them. Schweizer notes the additional problem that the guards became unconscious at Matthew 28:4, and he wonders how they could thus report anything.

== Notes ==
Preceded by Matthew 28:10	Gospel of Matthew; Chapter 28	Succeeded by Matthew 28:12
