= Matthew 28:16 =

- ← 28:15 28:17 →
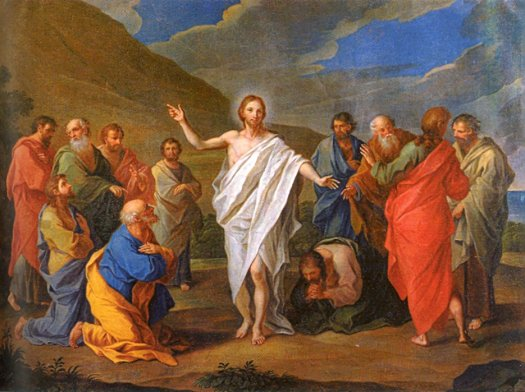
- Szymon Czechowicz's 1758 depiction of Christ and the eleven disciples
- Book: Gospel of Matthew
- Christian Bible part: New Testament

Matthew 28:16 is the sixteenth verse of the twenty-eighth chapter of the Gospel of Matthew in the New Testament. This verse opens the final scene of the gospel, Jesus' resurrection appearance before his disciples in Galilee.

== Content ==
The original Koine Greek, according to Westcott and Hort, reads:

οι δε ενδεκα μαθηται επορευθησαν εις την γαλιλαιαν
εις το ορος ου εταξατο αυτοις ο ιησους

In the King James Version of the Bible it is translated as:

Then the eleven disciples went away into Galilee,
into a mountain where Jesus had appointed them.

The modern World English Bible translates the passage as:

But the eleven disciples went into Galilee,
to the mountain where Jesus had sent them. (Note: For a collection of other versions see BibleHub: Matthew 28:16)

== Analysis ==
The count of disciples is down to eleven, reduced by the betrayal and death of Judas. Eleven is a very specific number, not one like 12 or 40 that in this period could also stand for an approximate number. There are an array of different resurrection appearances of Jesus in the New Testament. To rationalize them, some authors have attempted to combine some of the appearances. France notes that the specific number makes that far more difficult, for instance this thus cannot be an account of the same appearance as the one from 1 Corinthians 15:6, which mentions hundreds of followers being present.

The disciples are now back in Galilee, obeying Jesus' instructions at Matthew 26:32, and to the women at 28:7 and 28:10. There is no mention of the women delivering their message, but the presence of the disciples in Galilee implies that they did so successfully.

None of the previous commands had mentioned specifically that they should go to a mountain. Nolland notes that the verse could also be interpreted as reading "the mountain where Jesus had commanded them". Thus rather than Jesus dispatching them here, this could be the mountain of the Sermon on the Mount of Matthew 5:1, from which Jesus had earlier issued his commands. Mountains have consistently been the site of great events in the Gospel of Matthew, with 14:23 and 17:1 also mentioning mountain settings. Mountains were also of much importance in the Old Testament.

== Notes ==
Preceded by Matthew 28:15	Gospel of Matthew; Chapter 28	Succeeded by Matthew 28:17
