= Pawtucket Congregational Church (Lowell, Massachusetts) =

Historic church in Massachusetts, United States

- U.S. National Register of Historic Places
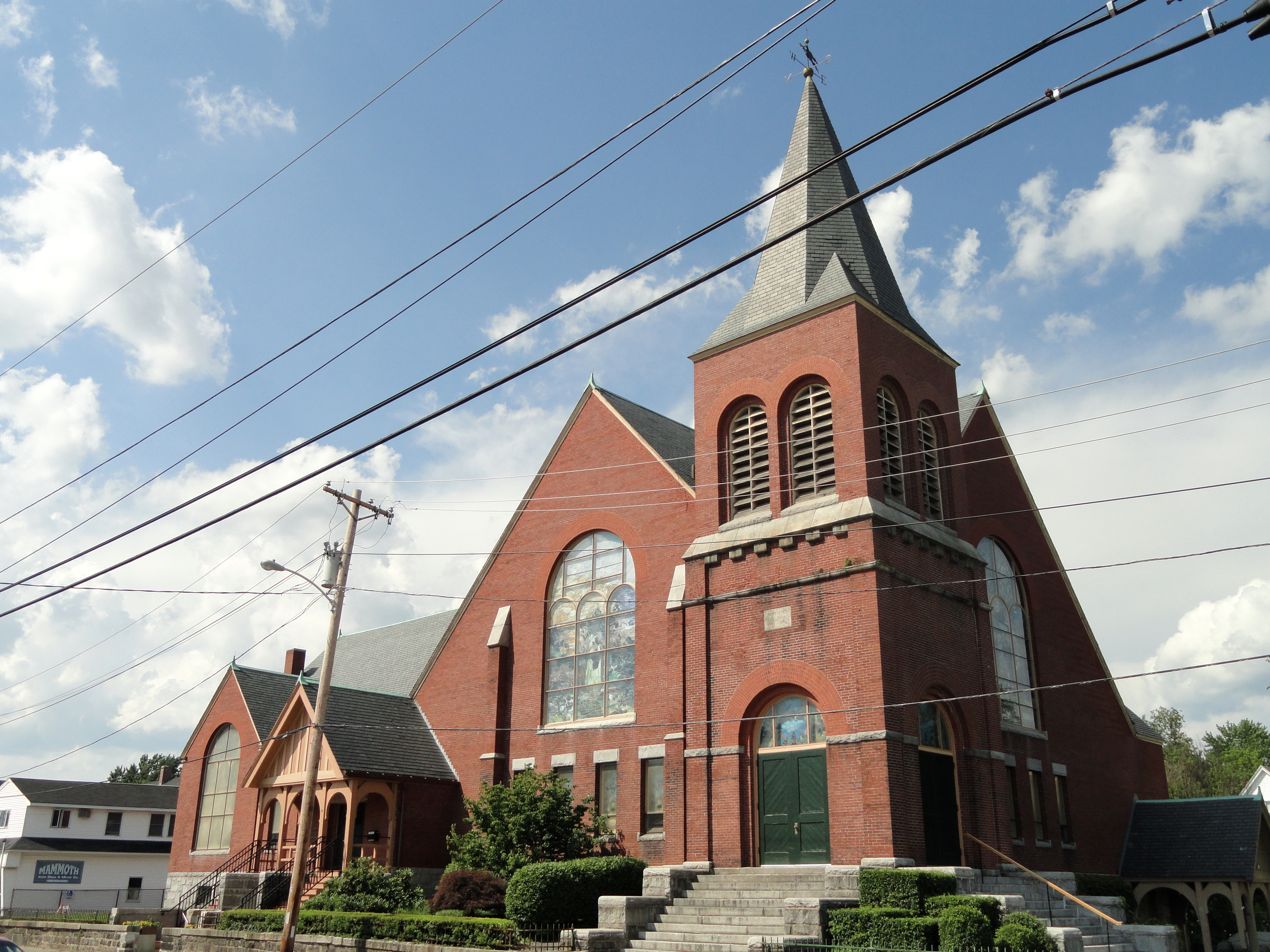

- Location within Massachusetts Location within the United States
- Location: Lowell, Massachusetts
- Coordinates: 42°39′2″N 71°19′56″W
- Built: 1898
- Architect: Brown, J. Merrill; Connell, Thomas H.
- Architectural style: Romanesque, Queen Anne
- NRHP reference No.: 07000167
- Added to NRHP: March 21, 2007

The Pawtucket Congregational Church is a historic church at 15 Mammoth Road in Lowell, Massachusetts. It sits across Massachusetts Route 113 from the Merrimack River at Pawtucket Falls on the site at which the Pennacook sachem Passaconaway once lived.

The church was gathered in 1797 by those who did not wish to travel to the center of Dracut for worship. Pawtucketville was part of Dracut when the church was founded. The current church building was erected in 1898, and exhibits Queen Anne and Romanesque Revival styling; its tower houses a bell cast by the Revere foundry in 1822. The building was listed on the National Register of Historic Places in 2007.

Pawtucket Congregational Church is an open and affirming congregation of the United Church of Christ.

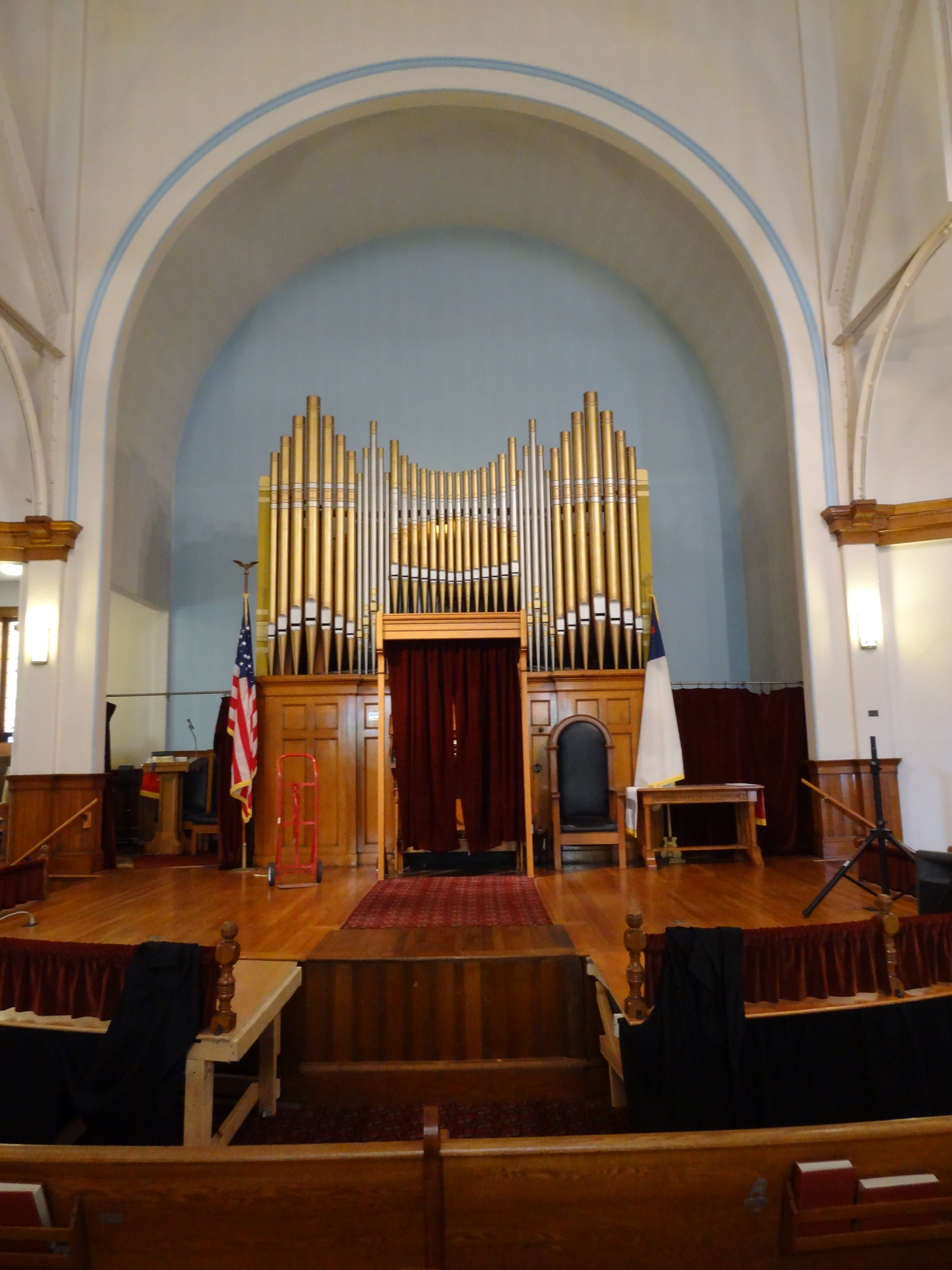
The church's chancel and pipe organ

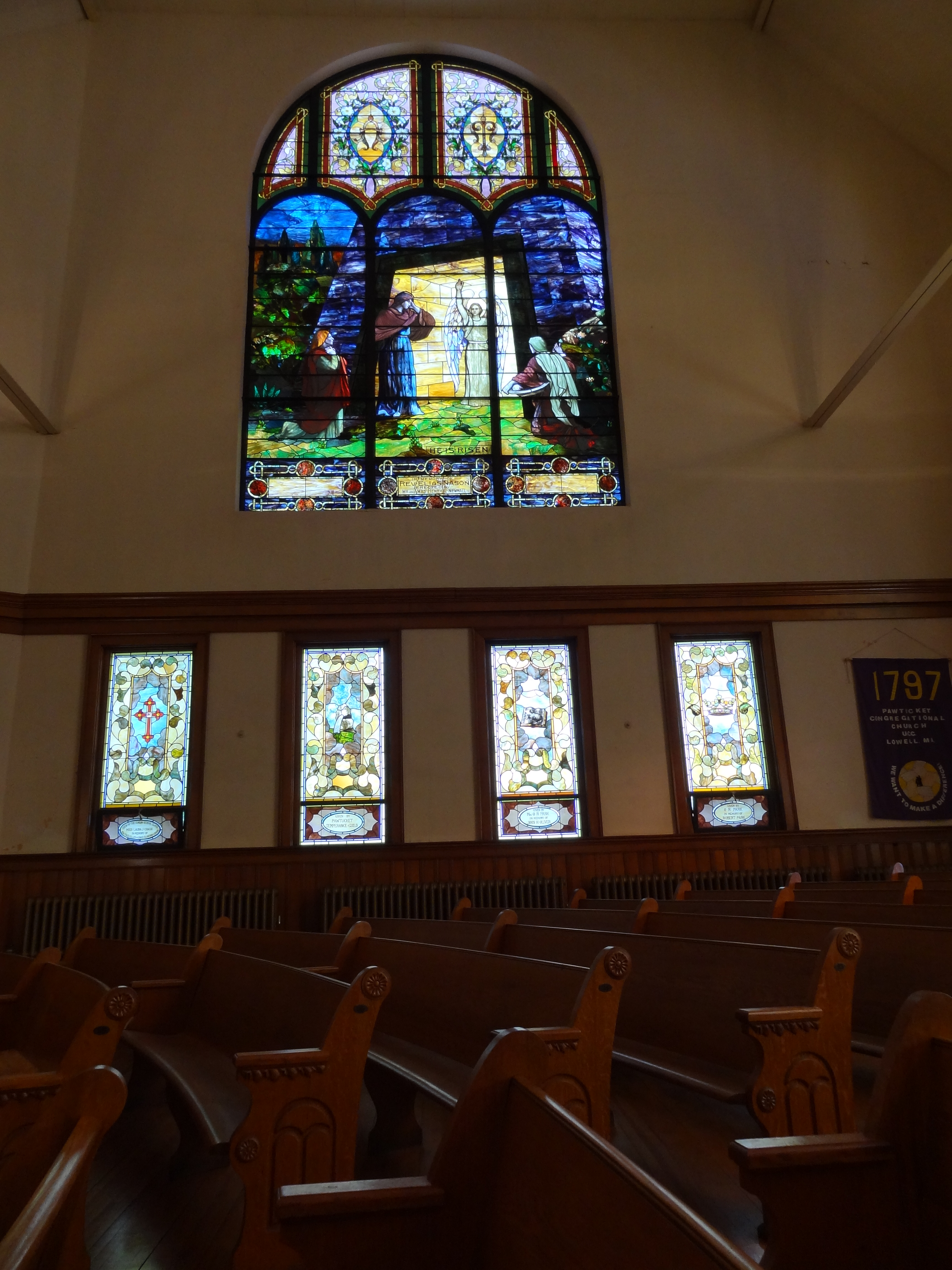
He Is Risen stained glass window

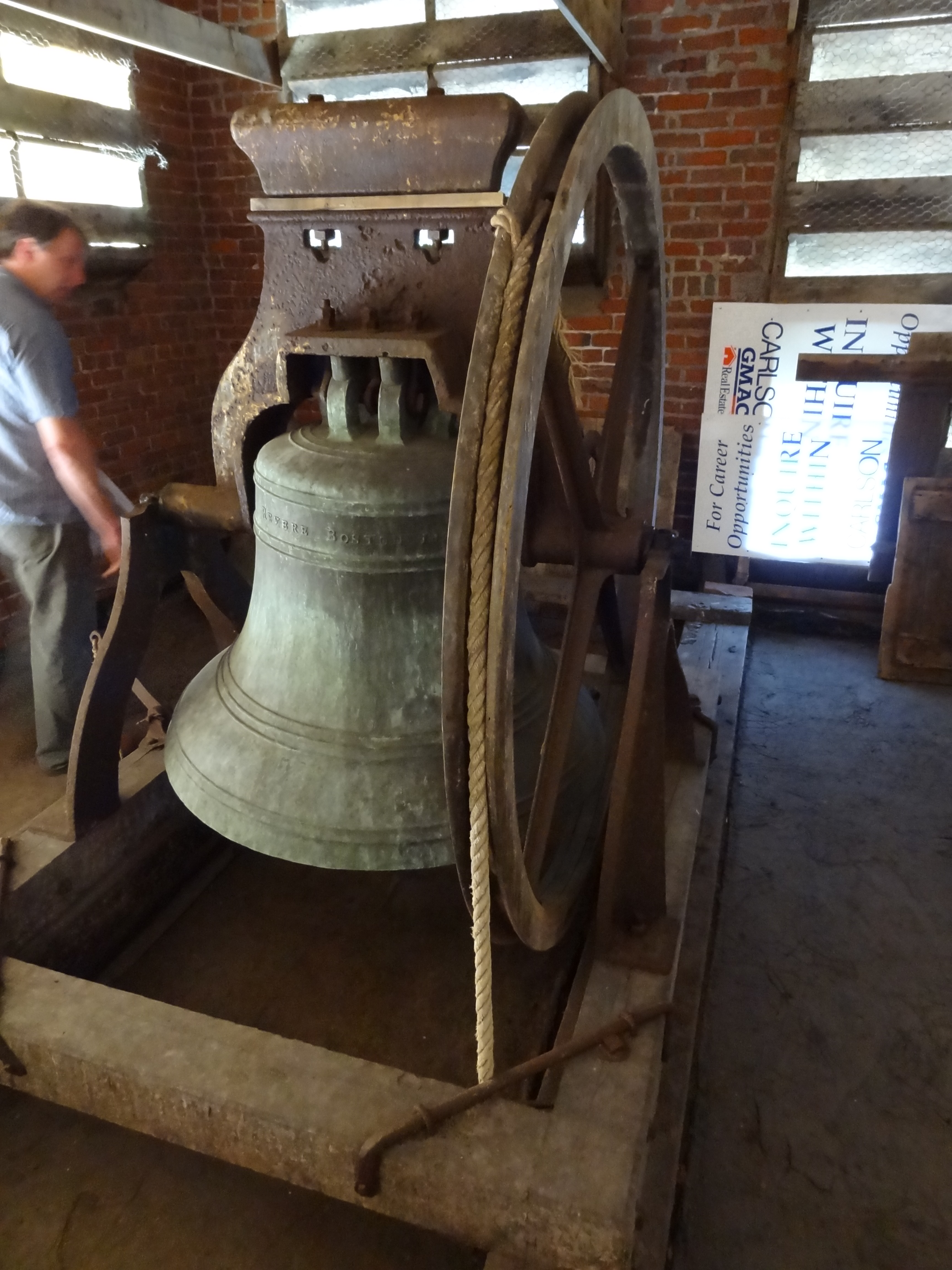
Church bell, made in 1822 by Revere Company

== See also ==
- National Register of Historic Places listings in Lowell, Massachusetts
