= Matthew 28:13 =

- ← 28:12 28:14 →
- Book: Gospel of Matthew
- Christian Bible part: New Testament

Matthew 28:13 is the thirteenth verse of the twenty-eighth chapter of the Gospel of Matthew in the New Testament. This verse is part of the resurrection narrative. In this verse the guards of the tomb, after being present for an angel hearkening the resurrection, were told what to say by the priests of Jerusalem after being bribed.

== Content ==
The original Koine Greek, according to Westcott and Hort, reads:

λεγοντες ειπατε οτι οι μαθηται αυτου νυκτος
ελθοντες εκλεψαν αυτον ημων κοιμωμενων.

In the King James Version of the Bible it is translated as:

Saying, Say ye, His disciples came by night,
and stole him away while we slept.

The modern World English Bible translates the passage as:

Saying, "Say that his disciples came by night,
and stole him away while we slept". (Note: For a collection of other versions see BibleHub: Matthew 28:13)

== Analysis ==
This verse links back to Matthew 27:64. In that verse the priests raised the idea of the disciples stealing the body as a reason for putting the guards in place. Thus, according to Matthew, the priests are making use of the deception that they themselves had warned of. It is notable that the priests make no attempt to deny that the body has been removed: it is accepted by all involved that the tomb is empty.

Craig S. Keener sees a number of problems with the priests' story. Stealing a body was considered deeply impious and a capital offence, and the disciples had taken no action to prevent the crucifixion itself. Why then would anyone believe they would take such risks to steal the body, especially when it was guarded by a Roman force? Also unbelievable was that anyone would sleep through the disciples rolling away the massive stone that covered the entrance to the tomb. And if the guards were asleep, how then did they know who it was who had robbed the tomb? While tombs were robbed in this era to get at the valuables inside, any guards present were usually killed or wounded. A guard claiming to have simply slept through the event was unlikely to be believed. Moreover, sleeping on duty was itself a serious offence in the Roman military. The standard punishment was a severe beating, and if the soldier survived they were expelled from the army and permanently exiled from country and family. Losing a dead body in your care was also an offence that could bring court martial and execution. Even if the bribe to Pilate was successful, questions would be asked as to how the guards avoided punishment following these events.

The poverty of the cover story is an issue which has long been noted. Fourth century commentator John Chrysostom saw this as further evidence of the incompetence of the priests, and their discombobulation at the news of the resurrection. Alexander Jones notes that the excuse given is simply a suggestion by the priests to the soldiers, and that the soldiers with their better understanding of their duties would likely have made up a more credible excuse.

== Notes ==
Preceded by Matthew 28:12	Gospel of Matthew; Chapter 28	Succeeded by Matthew 28:14
