= Matthew 28:19 =

- ← 28:18 28:20 →
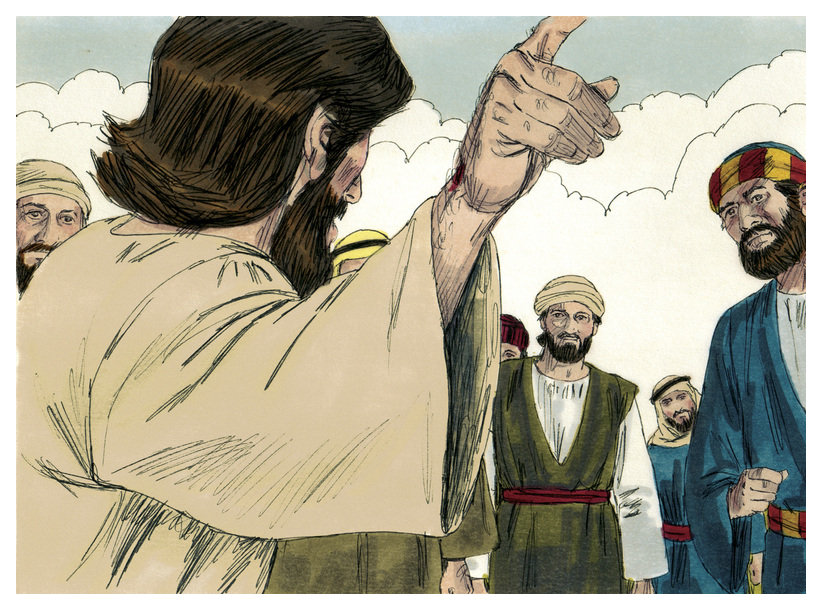
- "Go and teach all nations": biblical illustration by Jim Padgett (1930–2009).
- Book: Gospel of Matthew
- Christian Bible part: New Testament

Matthew 28:19 is the nineteenth verse of the twenty-eighth chapter of the Gospel of Matthew in the New Testament. This verse is part of the Great Commission narrative, containing the command to go, teach and baptize new disciples with the trinitarian formula.

== Content ==
The original Koine Greek, according to Westcott and Hort/[NA27 and UBS4 variants], reads:

19: πορευθέντες οὖν μαθητεύσατε πάντα τὰ ἔθνη, βαπτίζοντες αὐτοὺς εἰς τὸ ὄνομα τοῦ πατρὸς καὶ τοῦ υἱοῦ καὶ τοῦ ἁγίου πνεύματος,

In the NA28 it is:

[19] πορευθέντες οὖν μαθητεύσατε πάντα τὰ ἔθνη, βαπτίζοντες αὐτοὺς εἰς τὸ ὄνομα τοῦ πατρὸς καὶ τοῦ υἱοῦ καὶ τοῦ ἁγίου πνεύματος,

In the King James Version of the Bible it is translated as:

19: Go ye therefore, and teach all nations, baptizing them in the name of the Father, and of the Son, and of the Holy Ghost:

The modern World English Bible translates the passage as:

19: Go, and make disciples of all nations, baptizing them in the name of the Father and of the Son and of the Holy Spirit.

The English Standard Version translates it as:

19. Go therefore and make disciples of all nations, baptizing them in the name of the Father and of the Son and of the Holy Spirit,

whereas other versions say "into the name" (e.g., the American Standard Version) or say "to the name" (e.g., Young's Literal Translation). (Note: For a collection of other versions see BibleHub: Matthew 28:19)

== Analysis ==
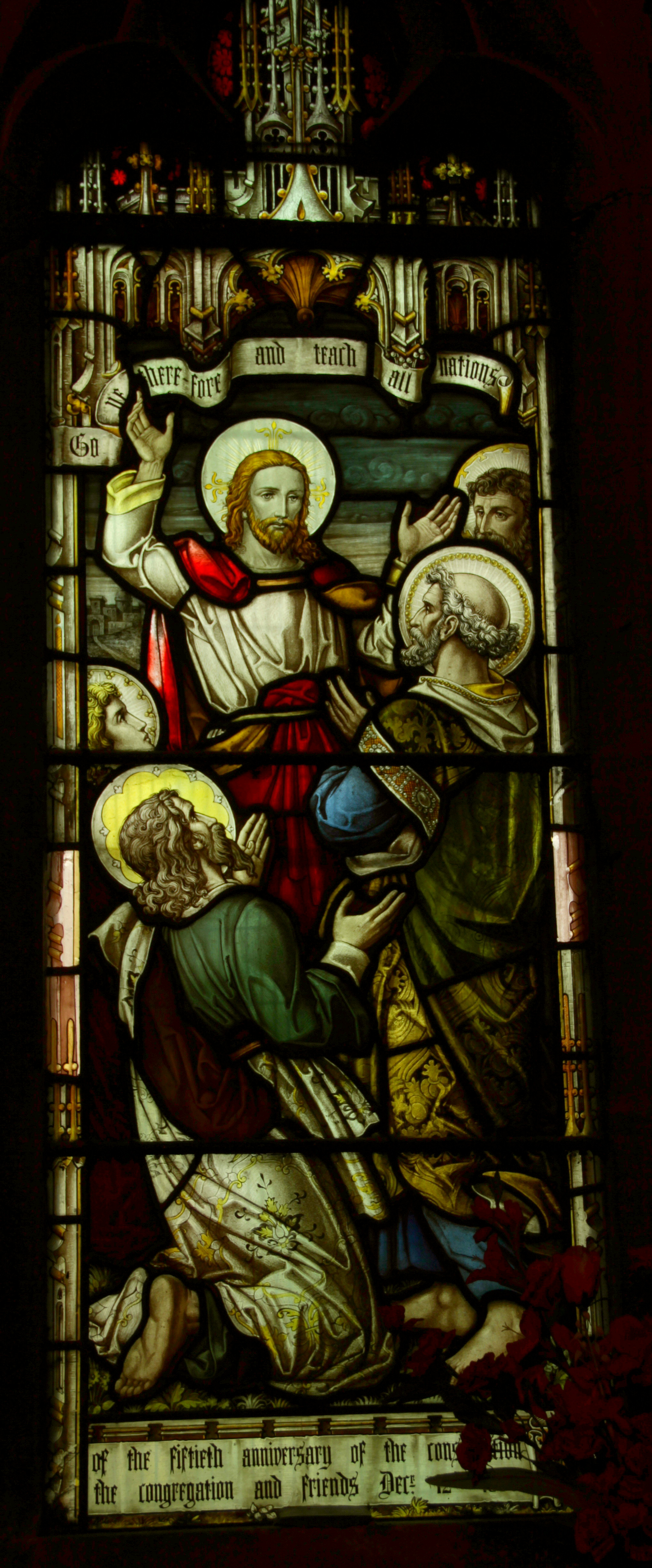
Go ye therefore and teach all nations. Stained glass window in St Matthew's Church, Carr Bottom Road, Bankfoot, Bradford, West Yorkshire, England.

The word "all" (Ancient Greek: πάντα, panta) is found multiple times in the verses 18–20, tying them together: all power/authority, all nations, all things ("that I have commanded you") and all the days ("always"). "All nations" comprises 'non-Jews as well as Jews'.

Dale Allison notes a persistent correlation of the Great Commission narrative (verses 16–20) with Moses, starting with "the mountain", as 'Moses ended his earthly course on a mountain'; the commissioning of Joshua by God through Moses; and the close parallels in Deuteronomy 31:14–15, 23; and Joshua 1:1–9, which are 'all about God'. In Joshua 1:2, Joshua was commanded to 'go' (cf. Matthew 28:19) and cross the Jordan River, whereas in Joshua 1:7 Joshua was to 'act in accordance with all the law that my servant Moses commanded you', then in Joshua 1:9 (the pericope's conclusion) God promises his presence: 'for the Lord your God is with you wherever you go'. The undeniable strong presence of a Moses typology in the Gospel of Matthew raises up suggestions that this passage, like the commissioning stories in 1 Chronicles 22:1–16 and Jeremiah 1:1–10, 'deliberately borrows from the traditions about Moses'. Just as Moses, at the end of his life on earth, commissioned Joshua to 'go into the land peopled by foreign nations' and 'to observe all the commandments in the law', then further promised 'God's abiding presence', so similarly Jesus, at the end of his earthly ministry, commands his disciples 'to go into all nations' (the world) and 'to teach the observance of all the commandments' of the "new Moses", and then further promises 'his continual assisting presence'.

The word "therefore" ties Jesus' universal authority (verse 18) to the words of the commission: because Jesus now has this authority, therefore he sent his disciples to go spreading his rule over all nations by making more disciples; the disciples can go in confidence that their Lord/Master is 'in sovereign control of "everything in heaven and on earth"' (cf. Romans 8:28).

The phrase "in the name of" denotes 'to whom allegiance is pledged in baptism', which is tied to the unique trinitarian formula: "the Father and of the Son and of the Holy Ghost/Holy Spirit". This refers to the close association of the Son with the Father has been revealed in Matthew 11:27; Matthew 24:36, whereas 'all three persons' in the "Trinity" were involved in the baptism of Jesus (Matthew 3:16–17).

== See also ==
- Gloria Patri

== Sources ==
- Coogan, Michael David (2007). Coogan, Michael David; Brettler, Marc Zvi; Newsom, Carol Ann; Perkins, Pheme (eds.). The New Oxford Annotated Bible with the Apocryphal/Deuterocanonical Books: New Revised Standard Version, Issue 48 (Augmented 3rd ed.). Oxford University Press. ISBN 9780195288810.
- France, R. T. (1994). "Matthew". In Carson, D. A.; France, R. T.; Motyer, J. A.; Wenham, G. J. (eds.). New Bible Commentary: 21st Century Edition (4, illustrated, reprint, revised ed.). Inter-Varsity Press. pp. 904–945. ISBN 9780851106489.

Preceded by Matthew 28:18	Gospel of Matthew; Chapter 28	Succeeded by Matthew 28:20
