= Matthew 28:15 =

- ← 28:14 28:16 →
- Book: Gospel of Matthew
- Christian Bible part: New Testament

Matthew 28:15 is the fifteenth verse of the twenty-eighth chapter of the Gospel of Matthew in the New Testament. This verse is part of the resurrection narrative, providing the story on how the unbelievers treated the facts.

== Content ==
The original Koine Greek, according to Westcott and Hort/[NA27 and UBS4 variants], reads:

15: οἱ δὲ λαβόντες [τὰ] ἀργύρια ἐποίησαν ὡς ἐδιδάχθησαν. Καὶ διεφημίσθη ὁ λόγος οὗτος παρὰ Ἰουδαίοις μέχρι τῆς σήμερον ἡμέρας.

In the King James Version of the Bible this verse is translated as:

15: So they took the money, and did as they were taught: and this saying is commonly reported among the Jews until this day.

The modern World English Bible translates the passage as:

15: So they took the money and did as they were told. This saying was spread abroad among the Jews, and continues until this day. (Note: For a collection of other versions, see BibleHub: Matthew 28:15)

== Analysis ==
The phrase "until this day" indicates a long interval, probably fifteen or twenty years between the events and the composition of the narrative in the Gospel of Matthew. Justin Martyr mentions the report still circulating among the Jews of his time (in the second century), that the Jews sent "chosen men" to all parts of the world to propagate it (Dialogue with Trypho Chapter 108. c. 160 CE).

The Jewish opponents of the Christianity (for example, Reimarus, centuries later) evidently did not dispute the historicity of the empty tomb, but rather assigned its cause to theft. This verse shows the origin of this "widely circulated" rumor of theft and answers it by showing that it was a self-serving lie fortified by money. Dale Allison argues that Matthew's Christian community definitely cared about what the contemporary Jewish community was saying.

R. T. France notes that the verb didaskō ("to teach") was used (the soldiers did as they were taught) to spread the lie, in contrast to the use of the same verb for the true teaching of Jesus in verse 20.

== Sources ==
- France, R.T. (2007). Bruce, Frederick Fyvie (ed.). The Gospel of Matthew. New international commentary on the New Testament. Wm. B. Eerdmans Publishing. ISBN 9780802825018.

Preceded by Matthew 28:14	Gospel of Matthew; Chapter 28	Succeeded by Matthew 28:16
