= Matthew 28:14 =

- ← 28:13 28:15 →
- Book: Gospel of Matthew
- Christian Bible part: New Testament

Matthew 28:14 is the fourteenth verse of the twenty-eighth chapter of the Gospel of Matthew in the New Testament. This verse is part of the resurrection narrative. In this verse the priests of Jerusalem assured the safety of the tomb guards should the governor, Pontius Pilate, receive report of their failure.

== Content ==
The original Koine Greek, according to Westcott and Hort/[NA27 and UBS4 variants], reads:

14: καὶ ἐὰν ἀκουσθῇ τοῦτο ἐπὶ τοῦ ἡγεμόνος, ἡμεῖς πείσομεν [αὐτὸν] καὶ ὑμᾶς ἀμερίμνους ποιήσομεν.

In the King James Version of the Bible it is translated as:

14: And if this come to the governor's ears, we will persuade him, and secure you.

The modern World English Bible translates the passage as:

14: If this comes to the governor's ears, we will persuade him and make you free of worry." (Note: For a collection of other versions see BibleHub: Matthew 28:14.)

== Analysis ==
The Roman soldiers who guarded the tomb would receive capital punishment for not properly doing their duty when the report of the missing corpse reached 'the governor's ears', as the fate of the keepers after Apostle Peter's miraculous liberation from the prison (Acts 12:19) shows. The priests used 'all persuasive powers' to assure the safety of these watchmen, that "Pilate would acquiesce in the deception, and that the Sanhedrin would make sure he did".

The guards could not be from the Roman platoon directly responsible to Pontius Pilate (cf. Matthew 27:65–66), because the governor would surely get to hear what happened, but could be a local troop of Jewish temple guard. France suggests that Pilate would not be concerned overmuch about the failure of soldiers not directly under his command.

In the apocryphal Gospel of Peter 11:43-49, the report was made directly to Pilate, then the Jewish elders came to beg Pilate to order the soldiers (unspecified whether Jewish or Romans) to keep quiet, which he did.

According to a fragment of Hegesippus, and Eusebius, Pilate eventually learned about the resurrection of Jesus, with no record of him punishing the guards, but it is noted that he sent an account of the matter to Tiberius, who then tried to make the senate pass a decree enrolling Jesus in the list of Roman gods. This fact is attested by Tertullian in his Apologeticus.

== Sources ==
- France, R.T. (2007). Bruce, Frederick Fyvie (ed.). The Gospel of Matthew. New international commentary on the New Testament. Wm. B. Eerdmans Publishing. ISBN 9780802825018.

Preceded by Matthew 28:13	Gospel of Matthew; Chapter 28	Succeeded by Matthew 28:15
