= Matthew 28:17 =

- ← 28:16 28:18 →
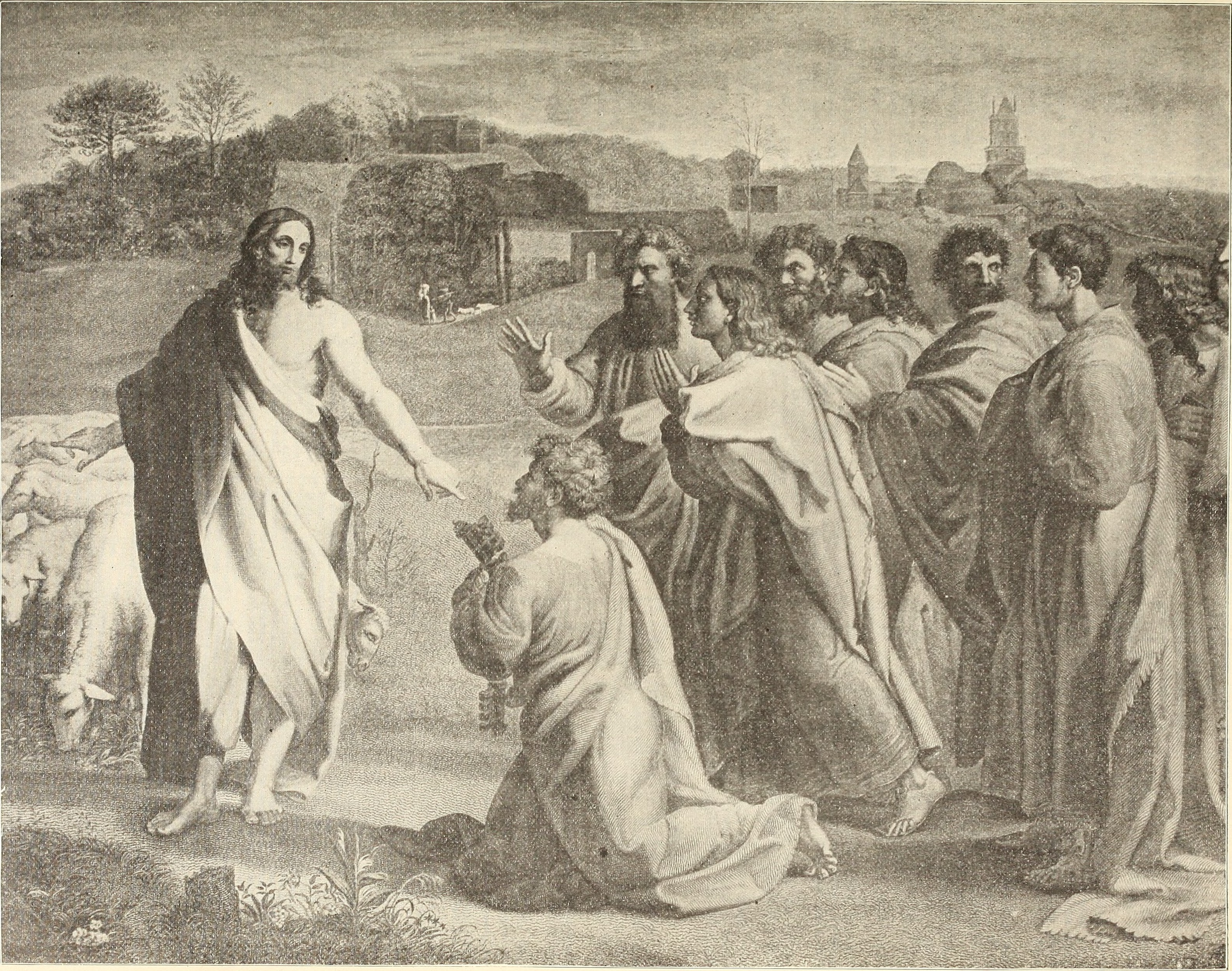
- Risen Jesus and the disciples. The ideal Holy Bible self-pronouncing, self-interpreting, self-explanatory. 1908
- Book: Gospel of Matthew
- Christian Bible part: New Testament

Matthew 28:17 is the seventeenth verse of the twenty-eighth chapter of the Gospel of Matthew in the New Testament. This verse is part of the resurrection narrative, recording a meeting of the risen Jesus with the disciples.

== Content ==
The original Koine Greek, according to Westcott and Hort/[NA27 and UBS4 variants], reads:

17: καὶ ἰδόντες αὐτὸν προσεκύνησαν, οἱ δὲ ἐδίστασαν.

In the King James Version of the Bible it is translated as:

17: And when they saw him, they worshipped him: but some doubted.

The modern World English Bible translates the passage as:

17: When they saw him, they bowed down to him, but some doubted. (Note: For a collection of other versions see BibleHub: Matthew 28:17)

== Analysis ==
The verse states briefly that "they saw him", then "they worshipped him", concluded by a puzzling phrase "but some doubted" (hoi de edistasan). The Greek root word for "doubted" is distazō, which is only used here and in Matthew 14:31 when Jesus rebuked Simon Peter for having "doubt" after he lost his confidence during his walk on the water toward Jesus. The "doubt" here does not denote intellectual disbelief ("refuse to believe"), but "hesitation". R. T. France notes that "hesitation" is linked with "worship" both in this verse and in chapter 14 ("hesitation" in Matthew 14:31; "worship" in Matthew 14:33).

The Greek word translated as "worshipped" comes from the verb proskuneó, indicating 'the homage and prostration before a king'. It occurs twelve times in the Gospel of Matthew, whereas it is found only twice each in the Gospel of Mark and in the Gospel of Luke.

== Sources ==
- France, R.T. (2007). Bruce, Frederick Fyvie (ed.). The Gospel of Matthew. New international commentary on the New Testament. Wm. B. Eerdmans Publishing. ISBN 9780802825018.

Preceded by Matthew 28:16	Gospel of Matthew; Chapter 28	Succeeded by Matthew 28:18
