= Matthew 28:5–6 =

- ← 28:4 28:7 →
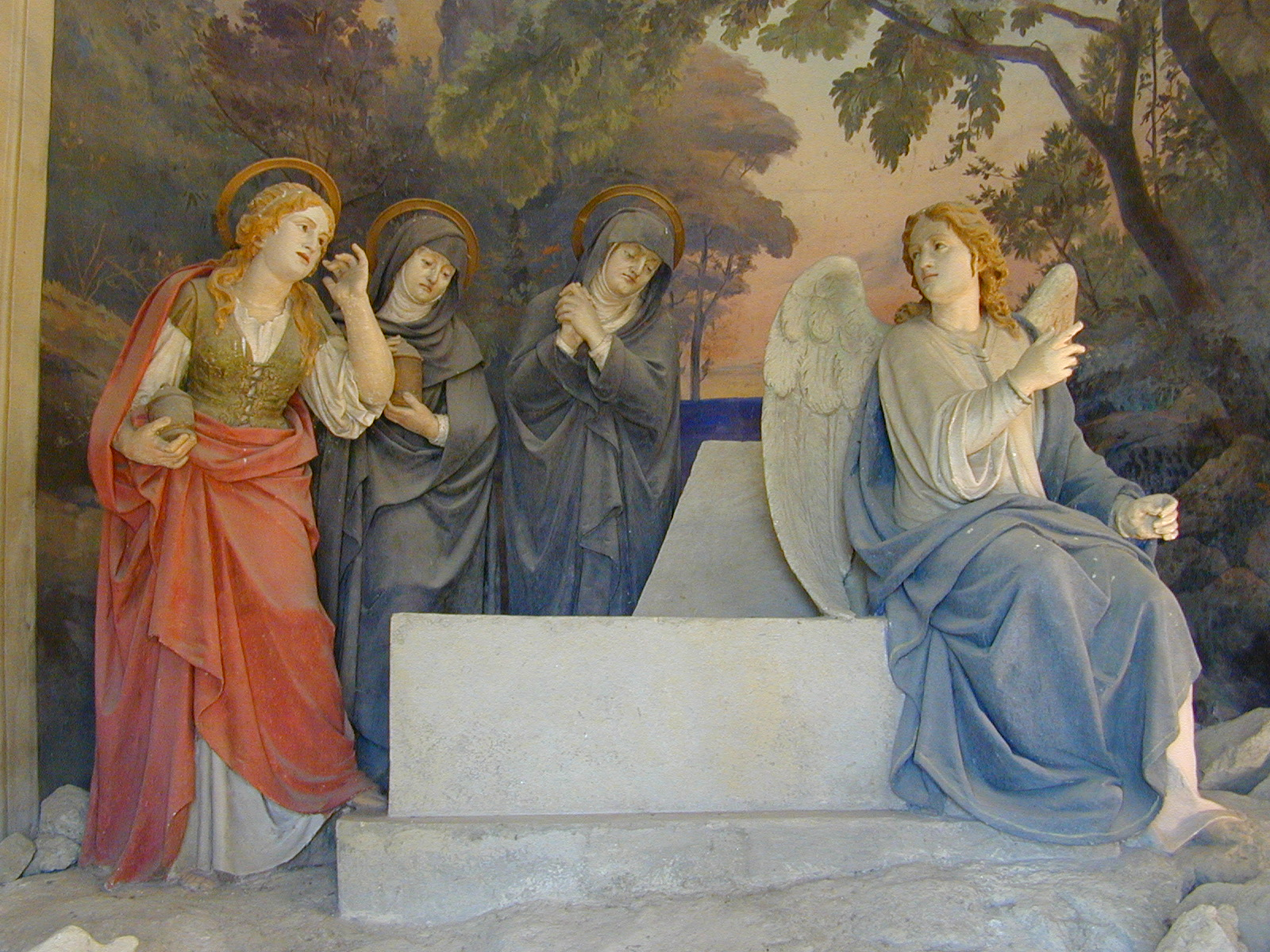
- Antonio Brilla's The finding of the empty tomb of Christ
- Book: Gospel of Matthew
- Christian Bible part: New Testament

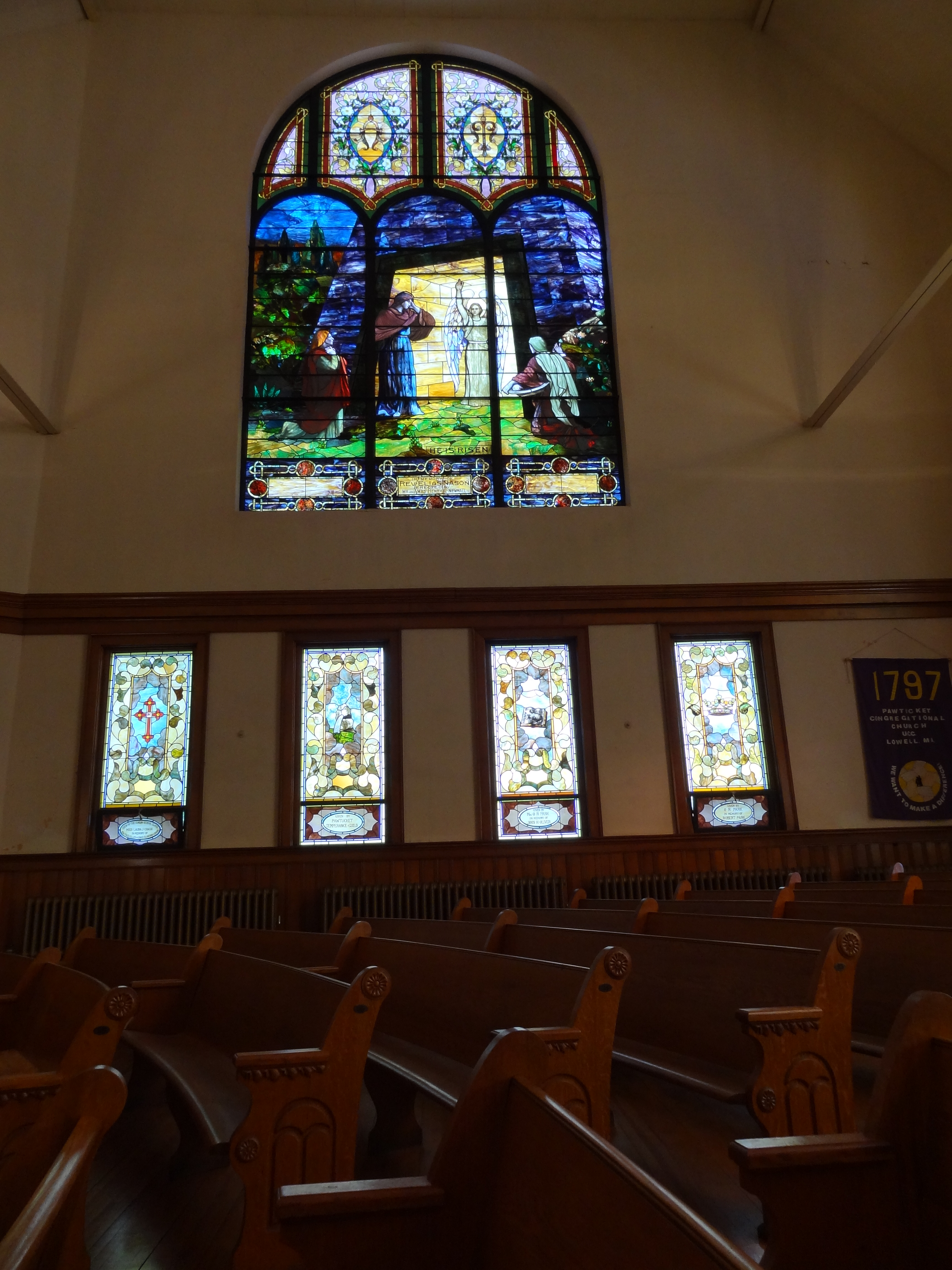
A stained glass window depicting the scene from Matthew 28:5-6 in which Mary Magdelene and two other women are told "He Is Risen" by an angel at Jesus's empty tomb. (Pawtucket Congregational Church, Lowell, Massachusetts)

Matthew 28:5–6 are the fifth and sixth verses of the twenty-eighth chapter of the Gospel of Matthew in the New Testament of the Christian Bible. Both verses form part of the resurrection narrative. An angel has appeared at the empty tomb and now gives instructions to Mary Magdalene and "the other Mary".

== Content ==
The original Koine Greek, according to Westcott and Hort, reads:

5: αποκριθεις δε ο αγγελος ειπεν ταις γυναιξιν μη φοβεισθε
υμεις οιδα γαρ οτι ιησουν τον εσταυρωμενον ζητειτε
6: ουκ εστιν ωδε ηγερθη γαρ καθως ειπεν
δευτε ιδετε τον τοπον οπου εκειτο

In the King James Version of the Bible, these verses are translated as:

5: And the angel answered and said unto the women, Fear not
ye: for I know that ye seek Jesus, which was crucified.
6: He is not here: for he is risen, as he said.
Come, see the place where the Lord lay.

The modern World English Bible translates the passage as:

5: The angel answered the women, “Don’t be afraid, for I
know that you seek Jesus, who has been crucified.
6: He is not here, for he has risen, just like he said.
Come, see the place where the Lord was lying. (Note: For a collection of other versions see BibleHub Matthew 28:5-6.)

== Analysis ==
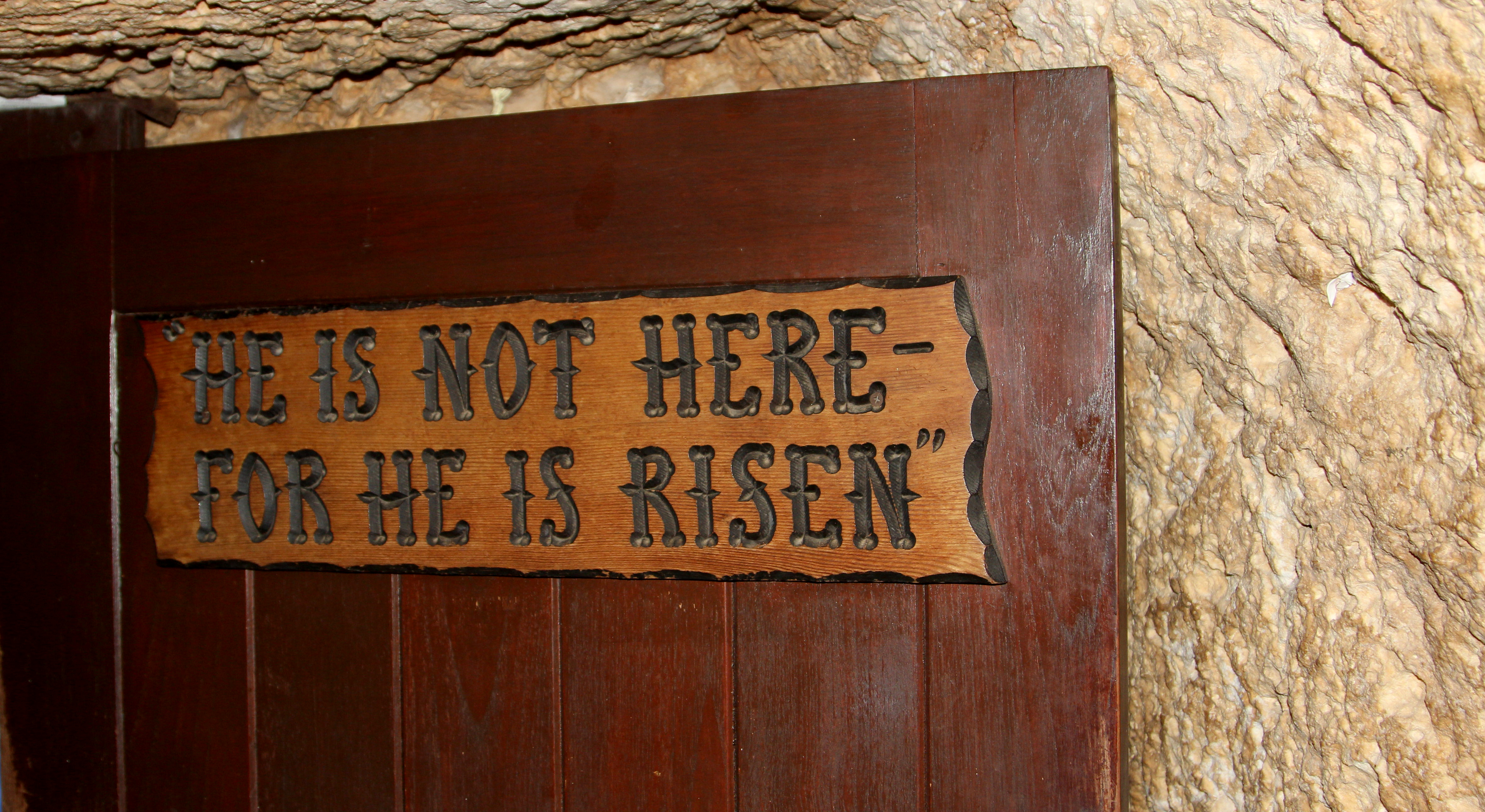
Engraving of a text from Matthew 28:6 (photographed in 2014).

After a short diversion (verse 4), which is found only in Matthew, verses 5 and 6 have Matthew rejoining Mark, with these verses paralleling Mark 16:6. In Mark, the women had felt fear at the presence of the angel, but in Matthew only the guards are mentioned as being afraid, while the women are counseled not be afraid, so the connection is less direct in this gospel. In the previous verse, the guards were so struck by fear that they had collapsed. Theologian Craig Keener notes that the angel had no interest in assuaging the fear of the guards, making it clear that the message of the angel is intended only for the women. An angel issues the same "do not to be afraid" at Matthew 1:20, implying that this is perhaps the same angel as in the infancy narrative.

The angel "answered" the women, not in response to any expressed question, but "in view of the terrifying effect which he saw was being produced upon the women by what was taking place".

The words of the angel are almost identical to the angel's words in Mark. In Mark, Jesus is called "the Nazarean". Unlike Mark, Matthew does not generally use that title, and it is dropped several times in his gospel. The tense of the word translated as crucified specifically denotes a complete act with continuing consequences, emphasizing the importance of the event. Since Matthew has the women still outside of the tomb, this verse also deviates from Mark by having the angel request that the women enter the tomb. In Mark the angel invites the women to see where "they put him", but Matthew had Joseph of Arimathea acting alone, so he drops the word "they" and reorders that part of the sentence.

These verses are part of a series of pieces of evidence Matthew presents to prove the truth of the resurrection story and refute the stolen body hypothesis, which at this time was being advanced by non-Christians. Having the women enter the tomb confirms that it was empty just after the stone was removed. These are also the same women who had earlier witnessed Jesus' interment at Matthew 27:60-61, so there is no doubt of a mistake. The angel also refers back to Jesus' prophesies of his own resurrection "as he said" (Matthew 20:19), thus helping confirm that Jesus was a true prophet.

== Bibliography ==
- Davies, W.D.; Allison, Dale C. Jr. (1997). A Critical and Exegetical Commentary on the Gospel According to Saint Matthew. Edinburgh: T. & T. Clark.
- Nolland, John (2005). The Gospel of Matthew: a Commentary on the Greek text. Wm. B. Eerdmans.

Preceded by Matthew 28:4	Gospel of Matthew; Chapter 28	Succeeded by Matthew 28:7
