= Matthew 28:7 =

- ← 28:6 28:8 →
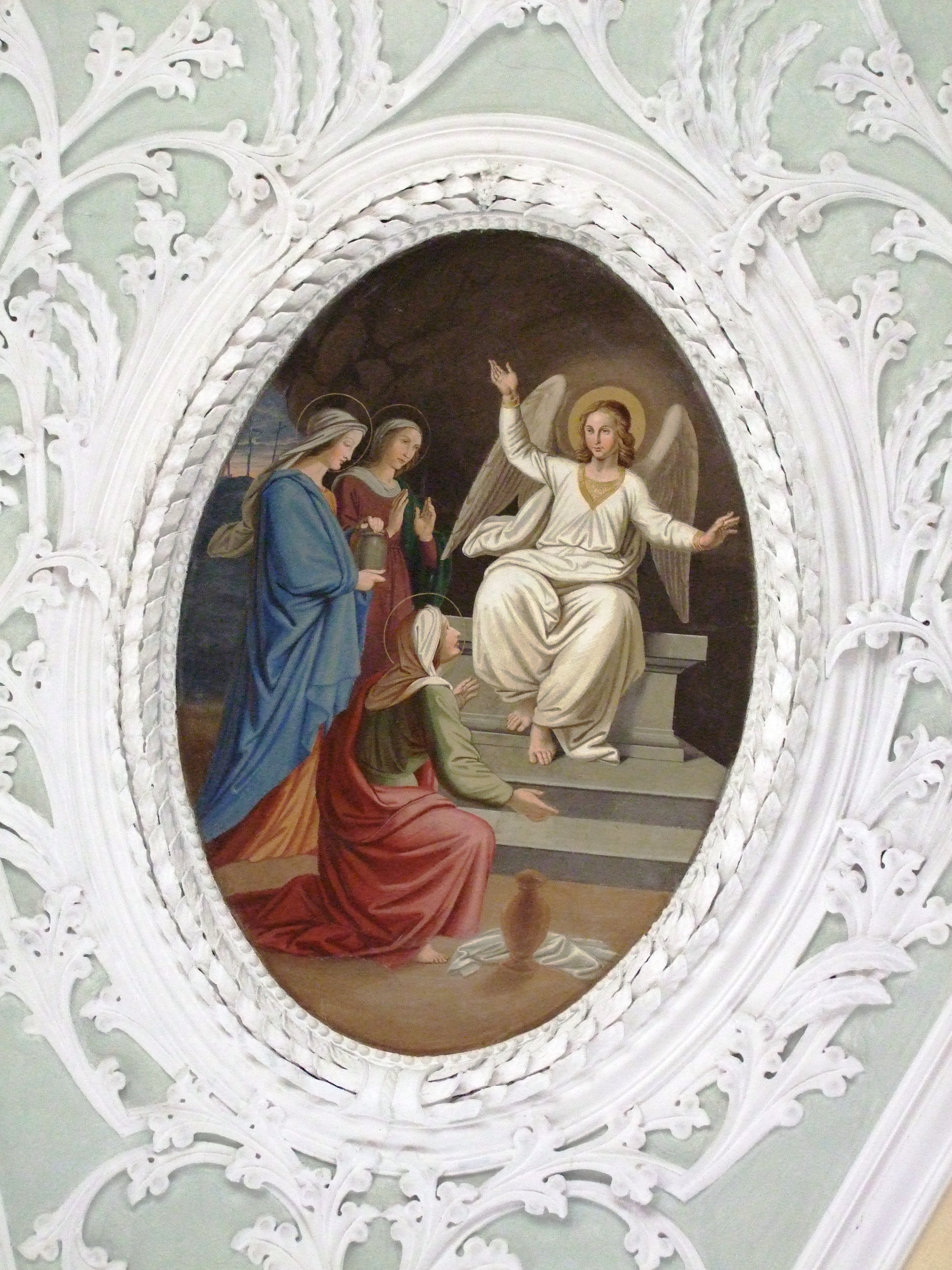
- An artistic depiction of the women hearing from the angel at the grave
- Book: Gospel of Matthew
- Christian Bible part: New Testament

Matthew 28:7 is the seventh verse of the twenty-eighth chapter of the Gospel of Matthew in the New Testament. This verse is part of the resurrection narrative. An angel has appeared at the empty tomb and in this verse he continues his instructions to Mary Magdalene and "the other Mary".

== Content ==
The original Koine Greek, according to Westcott and Hort, reads:

και ταχυ πορευθεισαι ειπατε τοις μαθηταις αυτου οτι ηγερθη απο των νεκρων
και ιδου προαγει υμας εις την γαλιλαιαν εκει αυτον οψεσθε ιδου ειπον υμιν

In the King James Version of the Bible it is translated as:

And go quickly, and tell his disciples that he is risen from the dead; and, behold,
he goeth before you into Galilee; there shall ye see him: lo, I have told you.

The modern World English Bible translates the passage as:

Go quickly and tell his disciples, 'He has risen from the dead, and behold, he
goes before you into Galilee; there you will see him.' Behold, I have told you. (Note: For a collection of other versions see BibleHub Matthew 28:7.)

== Analysis ==
This verse is a close parallel, and believed to be derived from Mark 16:7. The author of Matthew drops the specific reference to Peter. This decision has been speculated upon by many readers over the centuries, especially as Peter has a central role and is often emphasized throughout Matthew, most importantly at Matthew 16:18 where Jesus calls Peter the rock upon which he will build his church. It may be linked to Peter's denial of Christ. In this part of the narrative Matthew refers to the disciples as a unit, and dropping Peter may simply be to continue this pattern. Arlo Nau considered the omission of Peter from this verse "extraordinarily significant". He believed that Peter's removal here disproves that Matthew was trying to build Peter up as the leader of the church. Rather, Nau argued that Peter is first built up, and then brought down by his portrayal to emphasize the primacy of Jesus.

Matthew adds "he is risen from the dead" to the angel's speech. Gundry speculates that this is to emphasize the fact of the resurrection. The angel in Matthew, unlike Mark, reminds the women to go quickly. Nolland believes that this was added not so much because speed was important, but rather to emphasize the importance to the reader of the message the women are bearing. Like Matthew 28:2 it shows an elevation in drama over the original version in Mark.

The angel tells the disciples to go to Galilee, this fulfills Jesus' promise of Matthew 26:32. In Matthew the Great Commission is delivered in Galilee. Mark does not mention the location, while Luke and John have it take place in Jerusalem. R. T. France notes that throughout Matthew, Galilee is a location of great importance and in Matthew 4 where Jesus first begins his ministry. By contrast, in Matthew Jerusalem is a city where negative things consistently happen. Fowler notes that the move to Galilee may be an attempt to establish that Jesus is truly resurrected, and not just a ghost. Ghosts are confined by tradition to tombs or the place of death. Jesus appearing in Galilee, away from both of those things, is evidence he is not a ghost.

== Notes ==
Preceded by Matthew 28:6	Gospel of Matthew; Chapter 28	Succeeded by Matthew 28:8
