= Mark 16 =

- ← chapter 15 Luke 1 →
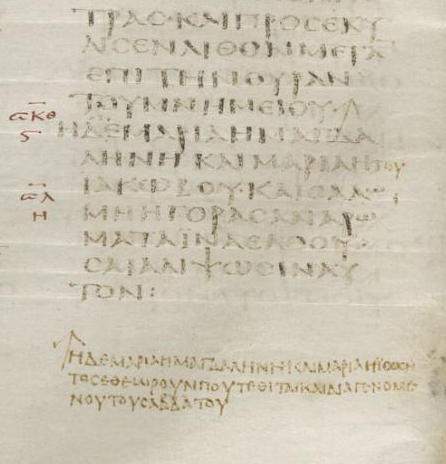
- First lines of Mark 16 from Codex Sinaiticus (c. 330–360)
- Book: Gospel of Mark
- Category: Gospel
- Christian Bible part: New Testament
- Order in the Christian part: 2

Mark 16 is the final chapter of the Gospel of Mark in the New Testament of the Christian Bible. Christopher Tuckett refers to it as a "sequel to the story of Jesus' death and burial". The chapter begins after the sabbath has ended, with Mary Magdalene, Mary the mother of James, and Salome purchasing spices to bring to the tomb next morning to anoint Jesus' body. There they encounter the stone rolled away, the tomb open, and a young man dressed in white who announces the resurrection of Jesus (16:1–6). The two oldest manuscripts of Mark 16 (from the 300s) conclude with verse 8, which ends with the women fleeing from the empty tomb, and saying "nothing to anyone, because they were too frightened". (Note: Mark 16:1–8: New Living Translation: "The most ancient manuscripts of Mark conclude with verse 16:8. Later manuscripts add one or both of the following endings ...")

Textual critics have identified two distinct alternative endings: the "Longer Ending" (verses 9–20) and the unversed "Shorter Ending" or "lost ending", which appear together in six Greek manuscripts, and in dozens of Ethiopic copies. Modern versions of the New Testament generally include the Longer Ending, but place it in brackets or otherwise format it to show that it was not part of the original text.

== Text ==
=== Textual witnesses ===
Some early manuscripts containing the text of this chapter are:

- Codex Vaticanus (325–350; extant verses 1–8)
- Codex Sinaiticus (330–360; extant verses 1–8)
- Codex Bezae (~400; complete: 1–20)
- Codex Alexandrinus (400–440; complete: 1–20)
- Codex Ephraemi Rescriptus (~450; complete: 1–20)

=== Sources ===
While some scholars argue that Mark 16 is a Markan composition, others argue that the chapter comes from an older tradition in the pre-Markan passion story. Those arguing in favor of Markan creation point to the numerous time indicators in verse 2, which bear similarities to other phrases in Mark. The scholars who argue in favor of Mark's use of a prior tradition argue that phrases such as "on the first day of the week" instead of the "third day" motif indicate a primitive tradition. Furthermore, many phrases found in Mark 16 seem to be non-Markan in their vocabulary. Dale Allison argues that, "The reduction of the empty tomb to Markan creativity, whatever the redactional motivation postulated, is not a compelling point of view...the case for the redactional origin of Mark 16:1–8 is unpersuasive, which is why so many Markan scholars, despite their differences on the details, see tradition here." The fact that Mark 16 is extremely reserved in its theological expression, having no Christological titles, proofs or prophecies, descriptions of the resurrection, and a reserved description of the angel at the tomb indicate a more primitive narrative source.

== Verses 1–8 (the empty tomb) ==
Tradition sites of Jesus' tomb
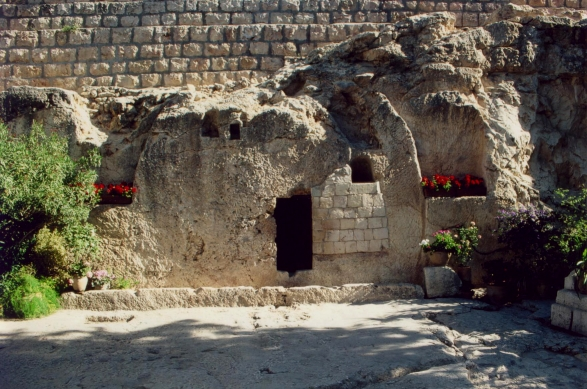
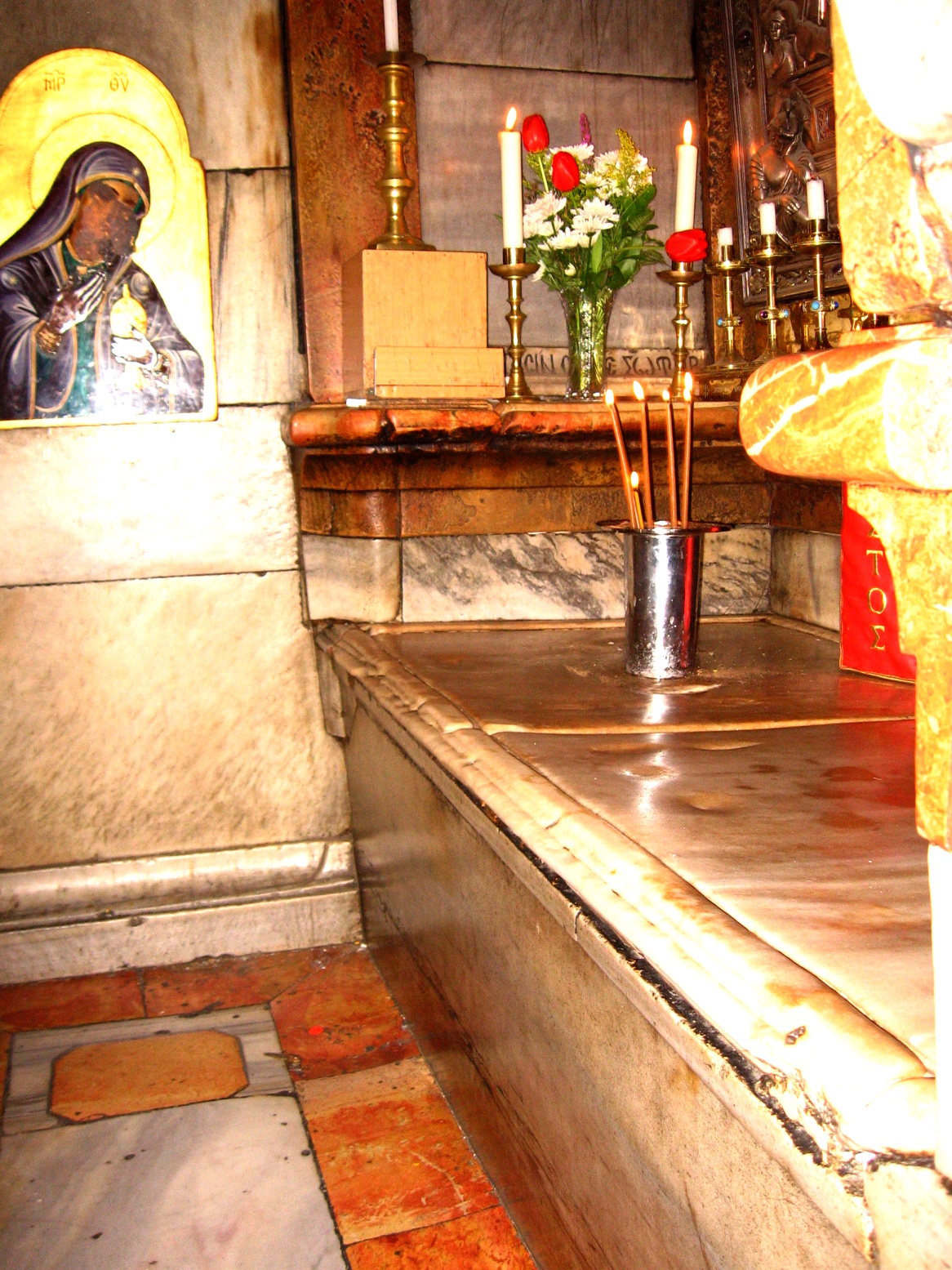
Left: outside of Garden Tomb; right: inside of the Church of the Holy Sepulchre

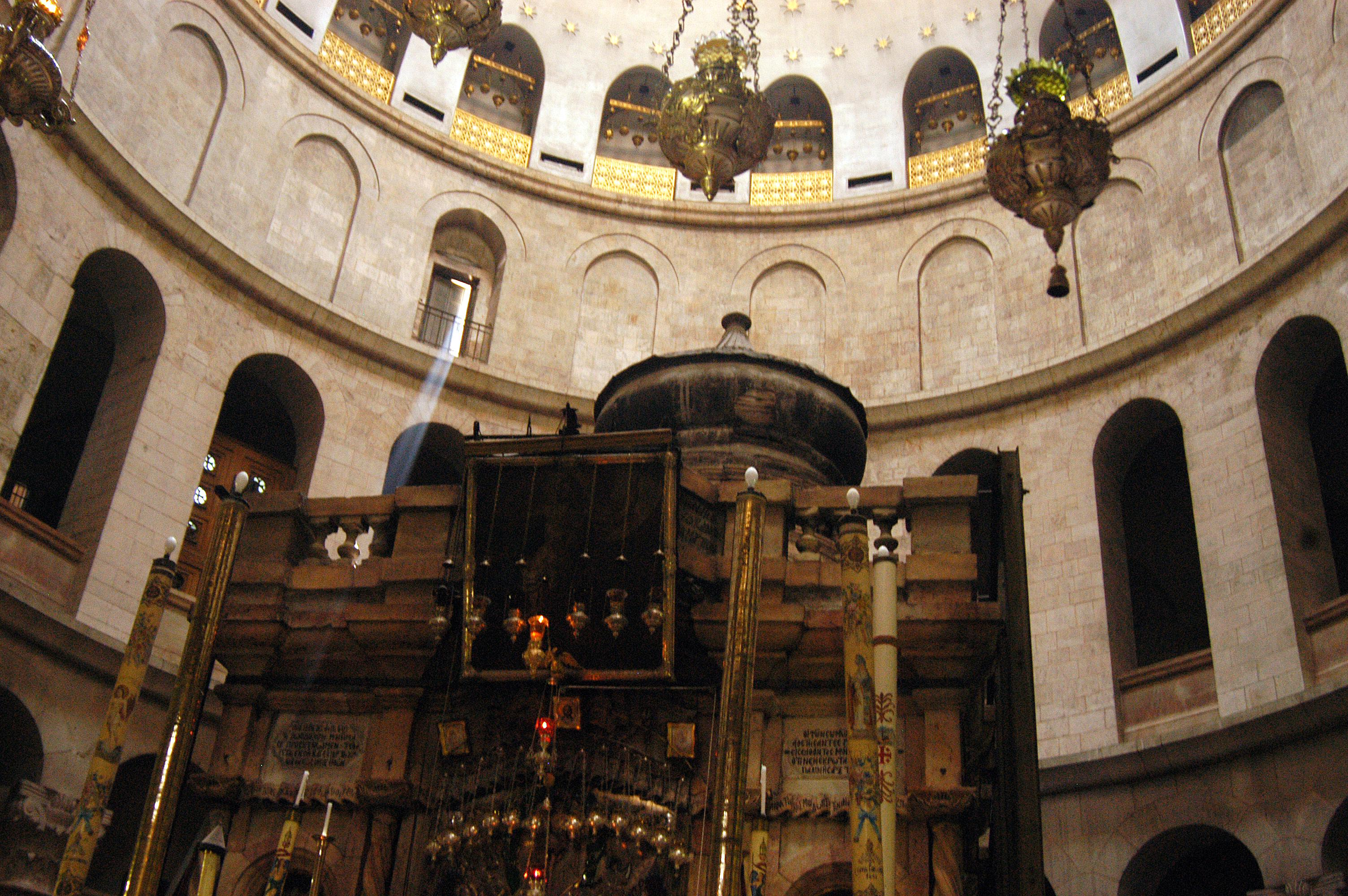
The Edicule of the Holy Sepulchre (The traditional location of Jesus' tomb) with the dome of the rotunda visible above

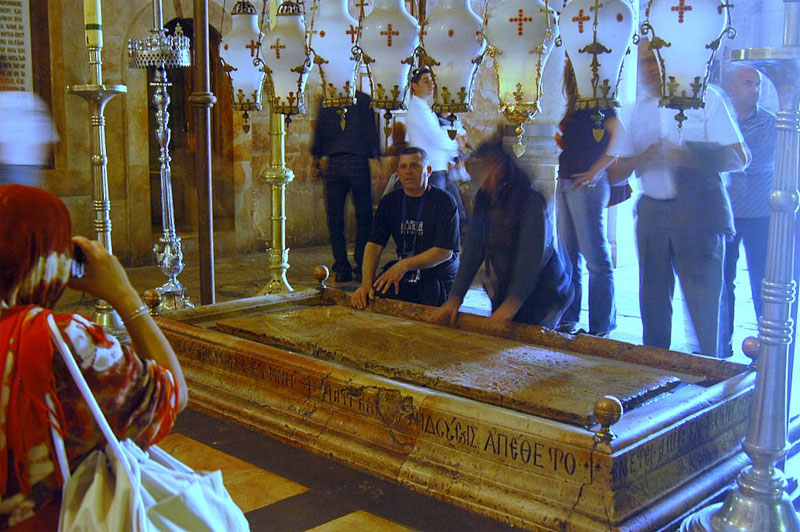
The Stone of the Anointing, believed to be the place where Jesus' body was prepared for burial

=== Verse 1 ===
When the sabbath was over, Mary Magdalene, and Mary the mother of James, and Salome bought spices, so that they might go and anoint him.

— Mark 16:1

The Sabbath ended at dusk, on the day known to Christians as Holy Saturday.

=== Verse 2 ===
And very early on the first day of the week, when the sun had risen, they went to the tomb.

— Mark 16:2

Just after sunrise, Mary Magdalene, another Mary, the mother of James, and Salome come with the spices to anoint Jesus' body. Mary Magdalene, Mary the mother of James the younger and of Joses, and Salome are also mentioned among the women "looking on from afar" in Mark 15:40, although those who "saw where the body was laid" in Mark 15:47 were only Mary Magdalene and Mary the mother of Joses.

Luke 24:1 states that the women had "prepared" the spices but John 19:40 seems to say that Nicodemus had already anointed his body. John 20:1 and Matthew 28:1 simply say "Mary Magdalene and the other Mary" came to see the tomb.

=== Verses 3–4 ===
They had been saying to one another, "Who will roll away the stone for us from the entrance to the tomb?" ^{4} When they looked up, they saw that the stone, which was very large, had already been rolled back.

— Mark 16:3–4

The women wonder how they will remove the stone over the tomb. Upon their arrival, they find the stone already gone and go into the tomb. According to Jesuit writer John J. Kilgallen, this shows that in Mark's account they expected to find the body of Jesus. Instead, they find a young man dressed in a white robe who is sitting on the right and who tells them that Jesus "has risen" and shows them "the place where they laid him" (verses 5–7).

=== Verses 5–7 ===
As they entered the tomb, they saw a young man dressed in a white robe sitting on the right side, and they were alarmed. ^{6} "Don't be alarmed," he said. "You are looking for Jesus the Nazarene, who was crucified. He has risen! He is not here. See the place where they laid him. ^{7} But go, tell his disciples and Peter, 'He is going ahead of you into Galilee. There you will see him, just as he told you.'"

— Mark 16:5–7

The white robe indicates that he is probably an angel: Matthew 28:5 describes him as such, and has him seated on the stone, away from the entrance. In the account in Luke 24:4–5 there were two men. John says that Mary Magdalene saw two angels after finding the empty tomb and showing it to the other disciples (John 20:1–2; John 20:11–12). She comes back to the tomb, talks to the angels, and then Jesus appears to her.

Jesus had predicted his resurrection and returning to Galilee during the Last Supper in Mark (Mark 14:28). Mark uses the passive verb form ēgerthē, translated "he was raised", indicating God raised him from the dead, (Note: "God raised him [Jesus] from the dead" New Revised Standard Version: Acts 2:24, Romans 10:9, 1 Corinthians 15:15; also Acts 2:31–32, Acts 3:15, Acts 3:26, Acts 4:10, Acts 5:30, Acts 10:40–41, Acts 13:30, Acts 13:34, Acts 13:37, Acts 17:30–31, 1 Corinthians 6:14, 2 Corinthians 4:14, Gal 1:1, Eph 1:20, Col 2:12, 1 Thessalonians 1:10, Heb 13:20, 1 Peter 1:3, 1 Peter 1:21) rather than "he is risen", as translated in the NIV. (Note: See for example Mark 16:6 in the NRSV) and in the creeds. (Greek distinguished passive from middle voice in the aorist tense used here.))

Peter, last seen in tears two mornings previously, having denied any knowledge of Jesus (Mark 14:66–72), is mentioned in particular. Gregory the Great notes that "had the Angel not referred to him in this way, Peter would never have dared to appear again among the Apostles. He is bidden then by name to come, so that he will not despair because of his denial of Christ". (Note: Saint Gregory the Great's Sermon on the Mystery of the Resurrection, catholicism.org accessed 13 December 2017)

The last appearance of Peter's name in verse 7 (also the last among the disciples' names to be mentioned) can be connected to the first appearance of his name (as 'Simon') in Mark 1:16 to form a literary inclusio of eyewitness testimony to indicate Peter as the main eyewitness source in the Gospel of Mark.

=== Verse 8 ===
So they went out quickly and fled from the tomb, for they trembled and were amazed. And they said nothing to anyone, for they were afraid.

— Mark 16:8

Mark 16:1–8 ends with the response of the women: Those women, who are afraid (compare Mark 10:32), then flee and keep quiet about what they saw. Kilgallen comments that fear is the most common human reaction to the divine presence in the Bible. Mike Winger, in his video series on Mark, explains the note that the women "said nothing to anyone, for they were afraid" not as indicating that they never spoke about it, ever, but that on their way to report to the disciples and Peter, they did not stop to pass the time of day or gossip with anyone until they had delivered the message.

This is where the undisputed part of Mark's Gospel ends. Jesus is thus announced to have been raised from the dead, and to have gone ahead of the disciples to Galilee, where they will see Him.

== Alternate endings ==
Mark has two additional endings, the longer ending (verse 9–20), and the shorter ending (unversed).

Versions of Mark
Version	Text
Mark 16:6–8 undisputed text = Shortest/Abrupt Ending	[6] And he saith unto them, Be not affrighted: Ye seek Jesus of Nazareth, which was crucified: he is risen; he is not here: behold the place where they laid him. [7] But go your way, tell his disciples and Peter that he goeth before you into Galilee: there shall ye see him, as he said unto you. [8] And they went out quickly, and fled from the sepulchre; for they trembled and were amazed: neither said they any thing to any man; for they were afraid.
Longer ending 16:9–14	Now when Jesus was risen early the first day of the week, he appeared first to Mary Magdalene, out of whom he had cast seven devils. And she went and told them that had been with him, as they mourned and wept. And they, when they had heard that he was alive, and had been seen of her, believed not. After that he appeared in another form unto two of them, as they walked, and went into the country. And they went and told it unto the residue: neither believed they them. Afterward he appeared unto the eleven as they sat at meat, and upbraided them with their unbelief and hardness of heart, because they believed not them which had seen him after he was risen.
Freer Logion (between 16:14 and 16:15)	And they excused themselves, saying, This age of lawlessness and unbelief is under Satan, who does not allow the truth and power of God to prevail over the unclean things dominated by the spirits. (Note: Or, "does not allow the unclean things dominated by the spirits to grasp the truth and power of God") Therefore, reveal your righteousness now. — thus they spoke to Christ. And Christ responded to them, The limit of the years of Satan's power is completed, but other terrible things draw near. And for those who sinned I was handed over to death, that they might return to the truth and no longer sin, in order that they might inherit the spiritual and incorruptible heavenly glory of righteousness.
Longer ending 16:15–20	And he said unto them, Go ye into all the world, and preach the gospel to every creature. He that believeth and is baptized shall be saved; but he that believeth not shall be damned. And these signs shall follow them that believe; In my name shall they cast out devils; they shall speak with new tongues; They shall take up serpents; and if they drink any deadly thing, it shall not hurt them; they shall lay hands on the sick, and they shall recover. So then after the Lord had spoken unto them, he was received up into heaven, and sat on the right hand of God. And they went forth, and preached every where, the Lord working with them, and confirming the word with signs following. Amen.
Shorter ending/ conclusio brevior (unversed)	And they reported all the instructions briefly to Peter's companions. Afterwards Jesus himself, through them, sent forth from east to west the sacred and imperishable proclamation of eternal salvation. [Amen]. (Greek text (Note: UBS Greek New Testament p147 Παντα δε τα παρηγγελμενα τοις περι τον Πετρον συντομως εξηγγειλαν. μετα δε ταυτα και αυτος ο Ι{ησου}ς εφανη αυτοις, και απο ανατολης και αχρι δυσεως εξαπεστειλεν δι αυτων το ιερον και αφθαρτον κηρυγμα της αιωνιου σωτηριας. αμην.))

=== Longer ending ===
==== Text and interpretation ====
In this 12-verse passage, the author refers to Jesus' appearances to Mary Magdalene, two disciples, and then the Eleven (the Twelve Apostles minus Judas). The text concludes with the Great Commission, declaring that believers that have been baptized will be saved while nonbelievers will be condemned, and pictures Jesus taken to Heaven and sitting at the Right Hand of God.

Mark 16:9–11: Jesus appears to Mary Magdalene, who is now described as someone whom Jesus healed from possession by seven demons. She then "tells the other disciples" what she saw, but no one believes her.

Mark 16:12–13: Jesus appears "in a different form" to two unnamed disciples. They, too, are disbelieved when they tell what they saw.

Mark 16:14–16: Jesus then appears at dinner to all the remaining eleven Apostles. He rebukes them for not believing the earlier reports of his resurrection and tells them to go and "proclaim the good news to all creation. The one who believes and is baptised will be saved; but the one who does not believe will be condemned." Belief and non-belief are a dominant theme in the Longer Ending: there are two references to believing (verses 16 and 17) and four references to not believing (verses 11, 13, 14 and 16). Johann Albrecht Bengel, in his Gnomon of the New Testament, defends the disciples: "They did believe: but presently there recurred to them a suspicion as to the truth, and even positive unbelief." (Note: Bengel's Gnomon of the New Testament on Mark 16, accessed 14 December 2017)

Mark 16:17–18: Jesus states that believers will "cast out demons" and "speak in new tongues". They will also be able to handle snakes, be immune from any poison they might happen to drink, and will be able to heal the sick. Kilgallen, picturing an author putting words in Jesus' mouth, has suggested that these verses were a means by which early Christians asserted that their new faith was accompanied by special powers. According to Brown, by showing examples of unjustified unbelief in verses 10–13, and stating that unbelievers will be condemned and that believers will be validated by signs, the author may have been attempting to convince the reader to rely on what the disciples preached about Jesus.

Mark 16:19: Jesus is then taken up into heaven where, Mark states, he sits at the right hand of God. The author refers to Psalm 110:1, quoted in Mark 12:36, about the Lord sitting at the right hand of God.

Mark 16:20: the eleven leave and are dispersed throughout the world, "proclaim[ing] the good news everywhere" while the LORD works with them; the medieval feast of the Dispersion of the Apostles celebrated this event. Several signs from God accompanied their preaching. The word "Amen" was added in some ancient versions.

=== Shorter ending/conclusio brevior ===
The "Shorter Ending" or "conclusio brevior" (first manuscript c. 3rd century), with slight variations, is usually unversed, and runs as follows:

But they reported briefly to Peter and those with him all that they had been told. And after this, Jesus himself (appeared to them and) sent out by means of them, from east to west, the sacred and imperishable proclamation of eternal salvation.

Some texts add "Amen" at the end.

While the New Revised Standard Version places this verse between verse 8 and 9, it could also be read as verse 21. The women, in this passage, fulfill the instructions given in verse 7, but this obedience would appear to contradict the silence reported of them in verse 8, unless their fear was only temporary. (Note: Smith, B. C., The endings of the gospel of Mark, updated 3 April 2019, archived 22 February 2022, accessed 26 March 2023)

== Manuscripts ==
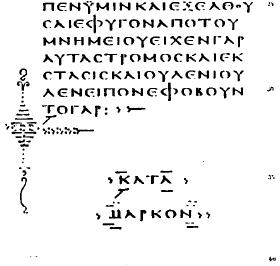
Mark ends at 16:8 in the 4th-century Codex Vaticanus Graecus 1209.

The earliest extant complete manuscripts of Mark, Codex Sinaiticus and Codex Vaticanus, two 4th-century manuscripts, do not contain the last twelve verses, 16:9–20, nor the unversed shorter ending. (Note: Papyrus 45 is the oldest extant manuscript that contains text from Mark, but it has no text from chapter 16 due to extensive damage.) Codex Vaticanus (4th century) has a blank column after ending at 16:8 and placing kata Markon, "according to Mark". There are three other blank columns in Vaticanus, in the Old Testament, but they are each due to incidental factors in the production of the codex: a change to the column-format, a change of scribes, and the conclusion of the Old Testament portion of the text. The blank column between Mark 16:8 and the beginning of Luke, however, is deliberately placed. (Note: According to T. C. Skeat, Sinaiticus and Vaticanus were both produced at the same scriptorium, which would mean that they represent only one textual tradition, rather than serving as two independent witnesses of an earlier text type that ends at 16:8. Skeat argued that they were produced as part of Eusebius' response to the request of Constantine for copies of the scriptures for churches in Constantinople. However, there are about 3,036 differences between the Gospels of Sinaiticus and Vaticanus, and in particular the text of Sinaiticus is of the so-called Western text form in John 1:1 through 8:38 while Vaticanus is not. Also against the theory that Eusebius directed the copying of both manuscripts is the fact that neither Vaticanus nor Sinaiticus contains Mark 15:28, which Eusebius accepted and included in his Canon-tables, and Vaticanus and Sinaiticus both include a reading at Matthew 27:49 about which Eusebius seems to have been completely unaware. Finally, there is a significant relationship between Codex Vaticanus and papyrus P75, indicating that the two bear a remarkable relationship to one another—one that is not shared by Codex Sinaiticus. P75 is much older than either, having been copied prior to the birth of Eusebius. Therefore, both manuscripts were not transcribed from the same exemplar and were not associated with Eusebius. The evidence presented by Skeat sufficiently shows that the two codices were made at the same place, and that the place in question was Caesarea, and that they almost certainly shared a copyist, but the differences between the manuscripts can be better explained by other theories.)

1. Ends Mark at verse 8 (Shortest/Abrupt Ending): Codex Sinaiticus (4th century), Codex Vaticanus (4th century), Syriac Sinaiticus (4th century), Codex Bobiensis (Latin translation, around 400), one Coptic manuscript from the 5th century, many Armenian manuscripts, some Georgian manuscripts, Minuscule 304 (12th century), Eusebius of Caesarea (c. 265–339), Hesychius of Jerusalem (5th century), Severus of Antioch (5th century), possibly also Clement of Alexandria (2nd century) and Origen of Alexandria (3rd century).
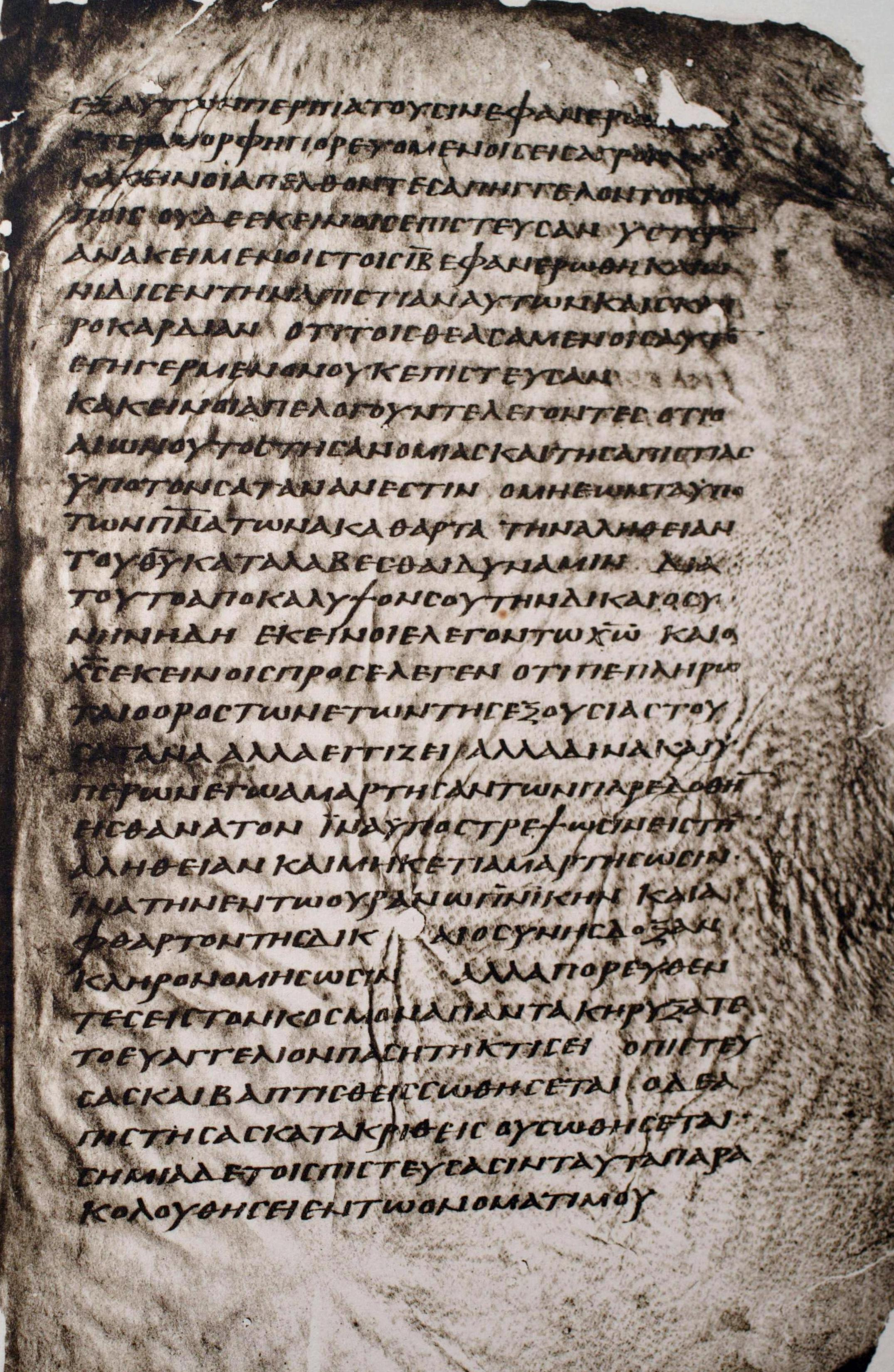
  Mark 16:12–17 on Codex Washingtonianus (4th/5th century)
2. Includes verses 9–20 in its traditional form: The Majority/Byzantine Text (over 1,500 manuscripts of Mark), Family 13, Codex Alexandrinus (5th century), Codex Bezae (5th century), Codex Ephraemi (5th century), Codex Koridethi (9th century), Athous Lavrensis (9th century), Codex Sangallensis 48 (9th century), minuscules: 33, 565, 700, 892, 2674. The Vulgate (380ad) and most of the Old Latin, Syriac Curetonian (5th century), Peshitta (5th century), Bohairic, most Sahidic, Gothic (4th century) (Note: Via the Speyer fragment. Carla Falluomini, The Gothic Version of the Gospels and Pauline Epistles.), the Harklean Syriac (600ad), Epistula Apostolorum (120-140ad), Justin Martyr (160ad), Diatessaron (160–175 AD), Irenaeus (180ad), Hippolytus (died 235ad), Vincentius of Thibaris (256ad), De Rebaptismate (258ad), Acts of Pilate (4th century), Fortunatianus (350ad), Apostolic Constitutions (4th century), Aphrahat (4th century), Ambrose (4th century), Augustine (4th-5th century), Cyril of Alexandria (5th century), Prosper of Aquitane (5th century), Nestorius (5th century), Peter Chrysologus (5th century), Leo the Great (5th century), Eznik of Golb (5th century).
3. Manuscripts including verses 9–20 with a notation: A group of manuscripts known as "Family 1" add a note to Mark 16:9–20, stating that some copies do not contain the verses. Including minuscules: 22, 138, 205, 1110, 1210, 1221, 1582. One Armenian manuscript, Matenadaran 2374 (formerly known as Etchmiadsin 229), made in 989, features a note, written between 16:8 and 16:9, Ariston eritzou, that is, "By Ariston the Elder/Priest". Ariston, or Aristion, is known from early traditions (preserved by Papias and others) as a colleague of Peter and as a bishop of Smyrna in the first century.
4. Manuscripts including verses 9–20 without divisions: A group of manuscripts known as "Family K1" add Mark 16:9–10 without numbered κεφαλαια (chapters) at the margin and their τιτλοι (titles) at the top (or the foot). This includes Minuscule 461.
5. Includes verses 9–20 with the "Freer Logion" (an interpolation after Mark 16:14): Noted in manuscripts according to Jerome (4-5th centuries) and the Codex Washingtonianus (late 4th, early 5th century) includes verses 9–20, and features an addition between 16:14–15, known as the "Freer Logion":

== Explanations ==
Both the shorter and the longer ending are considered to be later writings, which were added to Mark. (Note: Julie M. Smith, The Ending of Mark’s Gospel) Scholars disagree whether verse 8 was the original ending, or if there was an ending which is now lost. In the early 20th century, the view prevailed that the original ending was lost, but in the second part of the 20th century the view prevailed that verse 8 was the original ending, as intended by the author. (Note: Hypotheses on how to explain the textual variations include: Mark intentionally ended his Gospel at 16:8, and someone else, later in the transmission-process, composed the "Longer Ending" as a conclusion to what was interpreted to be a too-abrupt account.; Mark wrote an ending which was accidentally lost, perhaps as the last part of a scroll which was not rewound, or as the outermost page of a codex which became detached from the other pages, and someone in the 100's composed the "Longer Ending" as a sort of patch, relying on parallel-passages from the other canonical Gospels.; Mark did not intend to end at 16:8, but was somehow prevented from finishing, perhaps by his own death or sudden departure from Rome, whereupon another person finished the work while still in the production-stage, before it was released for church-use, by attaching material from a short Marcan composition about Jesus' post-resurrection appearances.; Mark wrote an ending, but it was suppressed and replaced with 16:9–20, which are a pastiche of parallel passages from the other canonical Gospels.; Verses 16:9–20 were written by Mark and were omitted or lost from Sinaiticus and Vaticanus for one reason or another, perhaps accidentally, perhaps intentionally. Possibly a scribe regarded John 21 as a better sequel to Mark's account, and considered the "Longer Ending" superfluous.)

=== Ending at verse 8 ===
Although scholars almost universally reject Mark 16:9–20, a debate continues about whether the ending at 16:8 is intentional or accidental.

==== Intentional ====
Numerous arguments have been given to explain why verse 8 is the intended ending.

There is scholarly work that suggests the "short ending" is more appropriate as it fits with the 'reversal of expectation' theme in the Gospel of Mark. Having the women run away afraid is contrasted in the reader's mind with Jesus' appearances and statements which help confirm the expectation, built up in Mark 8:31, Mark 9:31, Mark 10:34, and Jesus' prediction during the Last Supper of his rising after his death. According to Brown, this ending is consistent with Mark's theology, where even miracles, such as the resurrection, do not produce the proper understanding or faith among Jesus' followers. Richard A. Burridge argues that, in keeping with Mark's picture of discipleship, the question of whether it all comes right in the end is left open:

Mark's story of Jesus becomes the story of his followers, and their story becomes the story of the readers. Whether they will follow or desert, believe or misunderstand, see him in Galilee or remain staring blindly into an empty tomb, depends on us.

Burridge compares the ending of Mark to its beginning:

Mark's narrative as we have it now ends as abruptly as it began. There was no introduction or background to Jesus' arrival, and none for his departure. No one knew where he came from; no one knows where he has gone; and not many understood him when he was here.

Kilgallen proposes that maybe Mark gives no description of the resurrected Jesus because Mark did not want to try to describe the nature of the divine resurrected Jesus. Some interpreters have concluded that Mark's intended readers already knew the traditions of Jesus' appearances, and that Mark brings the story to a close here to highlight the resurrection and leave anticipation of the parousia (Second Coming). Others have argued that this announcement of the resurrection and Jesus going to Galilee is the parousia (see also Preterism), but Raymond E. Brown argues that a parousia confined only to Galilee is improbable.

==== Unintentional ====
The final sentence in verse 8 is regarded as strange by some scholars. In the Greek text, it finishes with the conjunction γαρ (gar, "for"). It is contended by some who see 16:9–20 as originally Markan that γαρ literally means because, and this ending to verse 8 is therefore not grammatically coherent (literally, it would read they were afraid because). However, γαρ may end a sentence and does so in various Greek compositions, including some sentences in the Septuagint; Protagoras, a contemporary of Socrates, even ended a speech with γαρ. Although γαρ is never the first word of a sentence, there is no rule against it being the last word, even though it is not a common construction. If the Gospel of Mark intentionally concluded with this word, it would be one of only a few narratives in antiquity to do so.

Some scholars argue that Mark never intended to end so abruptly: either he planned another ending that was never written, or the original ending has been lost. The references to a future meeting in Galilee between Jesus and the disciples (in Mark 14:28 and 16:7) could suggest that Mark intended to write beyond 16:8. C. H. Turner argued that the original version of the Gospel could have been a codex, with the last page being especially vulnerable to damage. Many scholars, including Rudolf Bultmann, have concluded that the Gospel most likely ended with a Galilean resurrection appearance and the reconciliation of Jesus with the Eleven, even if verses 9–20 were not written by the original author of the Gospel of Mark. Robert Gundry mentions that only about 10% of Mark's γαρ clauses (6 out of 66) conclude pericopes. Thus he infers that, rather than concluding 16:1–8, verse 8 begins a new pericope, the rest of which is now lost to us. Gundry therefore does not see verse 8 as the intended ending; a resurrection narrative was either written, then lost, or planned but never actually written.

=== Longer ending ===
==== Later addition ====
Many scholars agree that verses 9–20 were not part of the original text of Mark but are a later addition.

Critical questions concerning the authenticity of verses 9–20 (the "longer ending") often center on stylistic and linguistic issues. On linguistics, E. P. Gould identified 19 of the 163 words in the passage as distinctive and not occurring elsewhere in the Gospel. Dr. Bruce Terry argues that a vocabulary-based case against Mark 16:9–20 is indecisive, inasmuch as other 12-verse sections of Mark contain comparable numbers of once-used words.

Concerning style, the degree to which verses 9–20 aptly fit as an ending for the Gospel remains in question. The turn from verse 8 to 9 has also been seen as abrupt and interrupted: the narrative flows from "they were afraid" to "now after he rose", and seems to reintroduce Mary Magdalene. Secondly, Mark regularly identifies instances where Jesus' prophecies are fulfilled, yet Mark does not explicitly state the twice predicted reconciliation of Jesus with his disciples in Galilee (Mark 14:28, 16:7). Lastly, the active voice "he rose" is different from the earlier passive construction "[he] has been risen" of verse 6, seen as significant by some.

==== Dating ====
Because of patristic evidence from the late 100s for the existence of copies of Mark with 16:9–20, (Note: Patristic evidence: The earliest clear evidence for Mark 16:9-20 as part of the Gospel of Mark is in Chapter XLV First Apology of Justin Martyr (155–157). In a passage in which Justin treats Psalm 110 as a Messianic prophecy, he states that Psalm 110:2 was fulfilled when Jesus' disciples, going forth from Jerusalem, preached everywhere. His wording is remarkably similar to the wording of Mk. 16:20 and is consistent with Justin's use of a Synoptics-Harmony in which Mark 16:20 was blended with Lk. 24:53.; The Epistula Apostolorum (mid-late 2nd c.) likely incorporates all four Gospels, including the longer ending of Mark in sections 9-10, per the strong thematic, literary, and narrative sequence resemblance between the texts; Justin's student Tatian incorporated almost all of Mark 16:9-20 into his Diatessaron (160–175), a blended narrative consisting of material from all four canonical Gospels.; Irenaeus (c. 184), in Against Heresies 3:10.6, explicitly cited Mark 16:19, stating that he was quoting from near the end of Mark's account. This patristic evidence is over a century older than the earliest manuscript of Mark 16.; Writers in the 200s such as Hippolytus of Rome and the anonymous author of De Rebaptismate also used the "Longer Ending".; In 305, the pagan writer Hierocles used Mark 16:18 in a jibe against Christians, probably recycling material written by Porphyry in 270.; Eusebius of Caesarea, in his Gospel Problems and Solutions to Marinus No. 1, writes toward the beginning of the fourth century, "One who athetises that pericope would say that it [i.e., a verse from the ending of Mark] is not found in all copies of the gospel according to Mark: accurate copies end their text of the Marcan account with the words of the young man whom the women saw, and who said to them: 'Do not be afraid; it is Jesus the Nazarene that you are looking for, etc.', after which it adds: 'And when they heard this, they ran away, and said nothing to anyone, because they were frightened.' That is where the text does end, in almost all copies of the gospel according to Mark. What occasionally follows in some copies, not all, would be extraneous, most particularly if it contained something contradictory to the evidence of the other evangelists.") scholars widely date the composition of the longer ending to the early 2nd century.

==== Aimed addition or independent longer ending ====
Scholars are divided on the question of whether the "Longer Ending" was created deliberately to finish the Gospel of Mark, as contended by James Kelhoffer, or if it began its existence as a freestanding text which was used to "patch" the otherwise abruptly ending text of Mark. Metzger and Ehrman note that

Since Mark was not responsible for the composition of the last 12 verses of the generally current form of his Gospel and since they undoubtedly were attached to the Gospel before the [Christian] Church recognized the fourfold Gospels as canonical, it follows that the New Testament contains not four but five canonized witnesses to the Resurrection of Christ.

==== Intertextuality ====
Verses 9–20 share the subject of Jesus' post-resurrection appearances, and other points, with other passages in the New Testament. This has led some scholars to believe that Mark 16:9–20 is based on the other books of the New Testament, filling in details which were originally lacking from Mark. Jesus' reference to drinking poison (16:18) does not correspond to a New Testament source, but that miraculous power did appear in Christian literature from the 2nd century CE on.

Julie M. Smith notes that if there was an original ending, "then the Resurrection accounts in Matthew and/or Luke may contain material from Mark’s original ending.

=== Shorter ending/conclusio brevior ===
The shorter ending appears only in a minimal number of manuscripts as the sole ending. It is a quick summary, which contradicts verse 8. It probably originated in Egypt, and diverges from the style of Mark. The shorter ending appears in a manuscript sometime after the 3rd century.

== See also ==
- List of New Testament verses not included in modern English translations
- Johannine Comma
- Jesus and the woman taken in adultery
- John 21
- Luke 22:43–44
- Matthew 16:2b–3
- Overview of resurrection appearances in the Gospels and Paul
- Stolen body hypothesis

== Notes ==
Preceded by Mark 15	Chapters of the Bible; Gospel of Mark	Succeeded by Luke 1
