= John 20:9 =

- ← 20:8 20:10 →
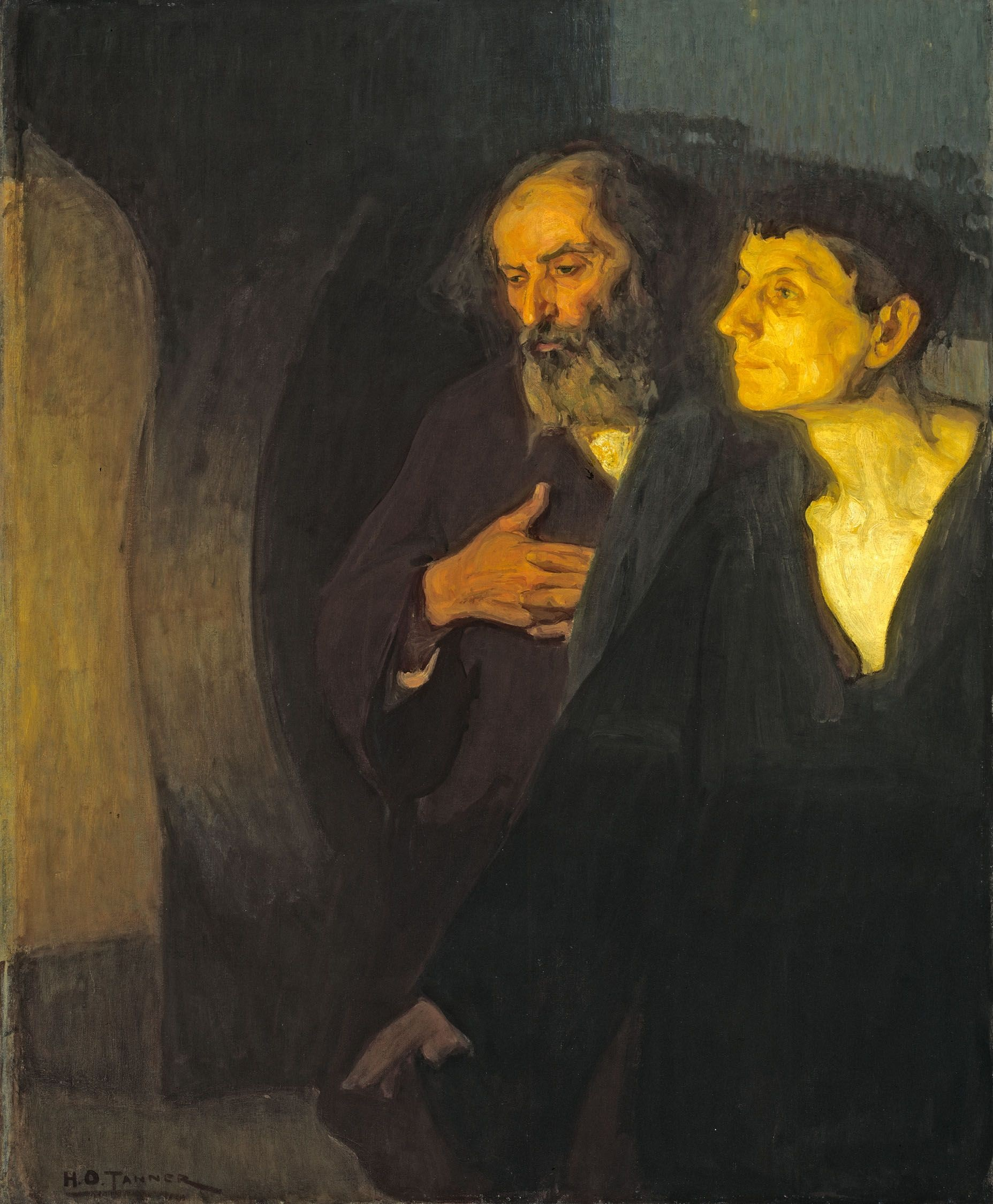
- Two Disciples at the Tomb: painting by Henry Ossawa Tanner (c. 1906)
- Book: Gospel of John
- Christian Bible part: New Testament

John 20:9 is the ninth verse of the twentieth chapter of the Gospel of John in the Bible. Peter and the Beloved Disciple have been examining Jesus' empty tomb and the arrangement of the grave clothes. John 20:8 states that the Beloved Disciple looked in the tomb and believed, although interpretations vary as to what exactly he believed. This verse seems to modify this statement but its exact meaning is also unclear.

== Content ==
In the King James Version of the Bible the text reads:

For as yet they knew not the scripture, that he must rise again from the dead.

The English Standard Version translates the passage as:

for as yet they did not understand the Scripture, that he must rise from the dead.

For a collection of other versions, see BibleHub John 20:9.

== Analysis ==
Who they refers to is uncertain. John only makes clear that Peter and the Beloved Disciple were present, but it is possible that Mary Magdalene was also there at this point. Thus some scholars, such as Hartmann, believe they refers to Peter and Mary, who were in ignorance, while the Beloved Disciple did understand that Jesus had risen from the dead. An alternative view is that they refers to Peter and the Beloved Disciple, and shows that they were both still ignorant about the resurrection and that this verse thus clarifies the preceding one and confirms that the Beloved Disciple did not realize that Jesus had risen. Rudolf Schnackenburg suggests that John 20:8, and everything else referring to the Beloved Disciple, is a later addition to the chapter. In this model, verse 9 would follow directly after 20:7 and would clearly be talking about Peter and Mary Magdalene.

Raymond E. Brown reports that the word scripture is grammatically singular and most of the time this form is used to refer to a single piece of scripture. No piece is cited: a "general reference to the scriptures" might be intended, or it is possible the author of John's Gospel assumed that his readers would know which text was referred to. Several passages from the Old Testament have been proposed as likely candidates for this source such as Psalm 16:10, For You will not leave my soul in Sheol, Nor will You allow Your Holy One to see corruption, or Hosea 6:2, and Jonah 1:17 and Jonah 2:1-10. Some scholars have also speculated that since the Gospel of John was likely written after most of the New Testament had been penned, the author could be referring to one of these works. Alternatively the singular form of the word scripture was sometimes used to refer to the entire body of scripture and this may be the usage the author intends.

Rudolf Bultmann has called this verse "a gloss of the ecclesiastical redaction" and argues that the verse is a later addition to the text. One piece of evidence for this is the phrase "risen from the dead". The author of John, unlike the other Gospel writers, does not favour the usage of to rise, preferring to ascend. Other scholars believe that the statement is original but misplaced, feeling it should follow verse 11. F. F. Bruce disagrees arguing that the word for makes the link between 20:8 and 20:9 clear.

The reformer John Calvin reflects that

For as yet they knew not the scripture, that he must rise again from the dead. They had often heard from the mouth of Christ what they now saw with their eyes, but this flowed from their hearts. Being now warned by the sight of a strange spectacle, they begin to think of Christ as having something Divine, though they are still far from having a clear and accurate knowledge of him.

Preceded by John 20:8	Gospel of John; Chapter 20	Succeeded by John 20:10
