= John 20:10 =

- ← 20:9 20:11 →
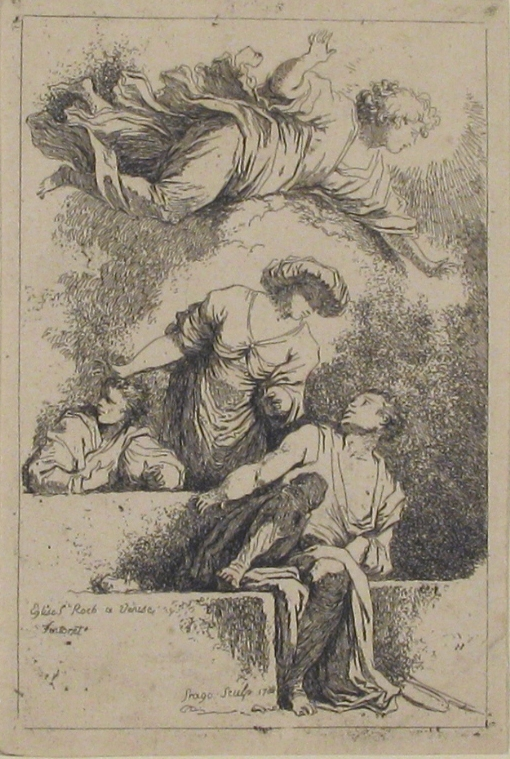
- "The Disciples at the Tomb": print by Jean Honoré Fragonard (1764)
- Book: Gospel of John
- Christian Bible part: New Testament

John 20:10 is the tenth verse of the twentieth chapter of the Gospel of John. Peter and the Beloved Disciple have just finished examining the empty tomb of Jesus, and in this short verse they return home.

== Content ==
The Greek text reads:

απηλθον ουν παλιν προς αυτους οι μαθηται.

In the King James Version of the Bible the text reads:

Then the disciples went away again unto their own home.

The English Standard Version translates the passage as:

Then the disciples went back to their homes.

For a collection of other versions, see BibleHub John 20:10.

== Analysis ==
Luke 24:12 describes this same scene but adds that on the trip home, Peter was "wondering what had happened". John does not make clear what is in the minds of the disciples, and some read John 20:8 as meaning that one or more of the pair had been convinced of the resurrection.

According to Raymond E. Brown, most scholars believe the home that the disciples depart for is not their actual home in Galilee, but rather where they had been staying in Jerusalem. Luke seemingly indicates that some of the disciples were traveling home after the crucifixion and it is not impossible that Peter and the Beloved Disciple were embarking on the long journey.

As it is indicated in John 20:2 that Peter and the Beloved Disciple were found separately by Mary Magdalene, (Note: The Greek text at verse 2 reads: προς σιμωνα πετρον και προς τον αλλον μαθητην. The repetition of προς (to) implies that the two disciples were not lodging together, although verse 3 suggests that they were staying close to each other.) it is also often assumed that Peter and the other disciple returned to separate areas. They will be together again that evening when Jesus appears to the ten disciples in John 20:19. René Kieffer notes that the departure of the two disciples allows Mary to meet Jesus alone (verses 11–18).

== Sources ==
- Kieffer, René (2007). "60. John". In Barton, John; Muddiman, John (eds.). The Oxford Bible Commentary (first (paperback) ed.). Oxford University Press. pp. 960–1000. ISBN 978-0199277186.

Preceded by John 20:9	Gospel of John; Chapter 20	Succeeded by John 20:11
