= Feast of Saint Mary Magdalene =

Liturgical commemorations of the Apostle of Apostles

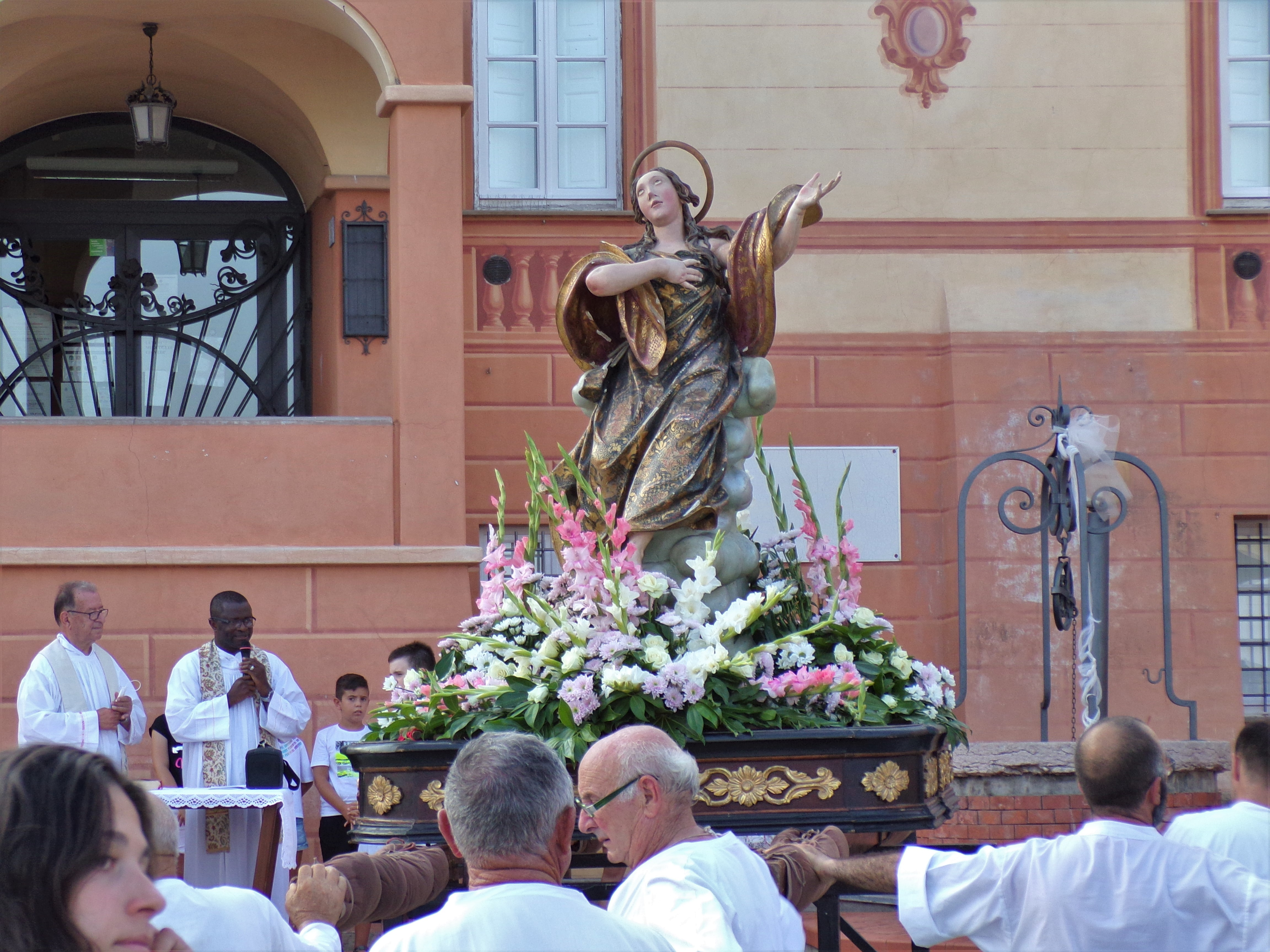
- Statue of Mary Magdalane for a procession in Boisàn
- Observed by: Confraternities, rural communities, Philippines, Corsica, Provence, France
- Type: Christian
- Celebrations: Processions, Masses, folk dances, corridas
- Date: 22 July
- Related to: Saint Isidore the Laborer

The Feast of Saint Mary Magdalene is a Christian feast day honouring Mary of Magdala, an early follower of Christ described in all four Gospels of the New Testament.

It is celebrated annually on 22 July according to the Gregorian Calendar and Revised Julian Calendar, used by Western Christianity (e.g. Roman Catholicism, Lutheranism, Anglicanism, etc.) and New Calendarist Eastern Orthodox Churches respectively, and on 4 August by Eastern Orthodox Churches using the Julian Calendar.

== Background ==
Mary Magdalene, identified in the New Testament as a loyal follower of Jesus, is a significant saint in Christian thought. According to the Gospels, she was healed by Jesus of seven demons (Luke 8:2), supported his ministry, stood at the foot of the Cross (John 19:25), and was the first to witness the resurrected Christ (John 20:11–18). Her role as the first to proclaim the Resurrection earned her the title Equal-to-the-Apostles in early Christian tradition.

Historically, Mary Magdalene's identity has been debated. In Western Christian tradition, she was sometimes conflated with Mary of Bethany and the sinful woman in Luke 7:36–50, though modern Biblical scholarship distinguishes these figures. In 2016, Pope Francis elevated her memorial to a feast in the Roman Catholic Church.

== History ==
The Feast of Saint Mary Magdalene has roots in Early Christianity, with evidence of her veneration dating to the 4th century. New Testament Apocrypha, such as the Gospel of Mary, emphasised her prominence amongst the Twelve Apostles, though these texts are not included in the canonical New Testament.

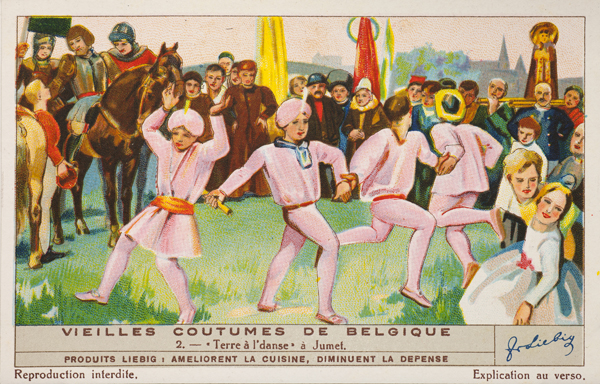
Since the miraculous intercession of Saint Mary Magdelene in 1380, an annual procession and danse, the «Terre à l’danse», is held in Belgium to honor the Feast of Saint Mary Magdalene with the Tour de la Madeleine.

In the Middle Ages, her cult grew in Western Europe, particularly in Provence, France, where legends claimed she evangelised after Jesus' Resurrection, living as a hermit in a cave at Sainte-Baume. The Dominican Order, which promoted her as a model of penitence, further popularised her feast. By the 13th century, her feast day was fixed on 22 July in the Roman Calendar.

The Reformation saw divergent views: Catholics emphasised her penitential role, while some Protestant traditions focused on her as a disciple. In the 20th century, ecumenical efforts and Biblical scholarship clarified her role, leading to the 2016 elevation of her memorial to a feast in the Catholic Church, aligning it with the liturgical rank of the apostles. After the liturgical revision in 1969 and 2021, the feast of Mary Magdalene continues to be on 22 July, while Mary of Bethany with whom it was conflated is now celebrated as a separate saint, along with her siblings Lazarus and Martha on 29 July.

== Liturgy ==
=== Roman Catholicism ===
In the Roman Catholic Church, the Feast of Saint Mary Magdalene is celebrated on 22 July with proper liturgical texts. The Mass includes readings emphasising her encounter with the risen Christ (John 20:1–2, 11–18) and her missionary role. The preface for the feast highlights her role as the "Apostle to the Apostles", chosen to announce the Resurrection.

The following chants are listed under her feast day in the Graduale Romanum. These are:

- Introit: Tibi Dixit cor meum (Psalm 27:8)
- Gradual: Audi, filia, et vide (Psalm 44:11)
- Alleluia: Surrexit Dominus de sepulchro
- Offertory: Deus, Deus meus, ad te de luce viglio (Psalm 62:2)
- Communion: Notas mihi fecisti (Psalm 15:10)

=== Eastern Orthodoxy ===
In the Eastern Orthodox Church, her feast is likewise commemorated on 22 July; she is given the titles of Equal-to-the-Apostles and Myrrhbearer for her role as the first person to announce the Resurrection of Christ.

=== Anglicanism ===
The Book of Common Prayer includes collects and readings for 22 July.

== Local Customs ==
The Feast of Saint Mary Magdalene is celebrated with diverse customs worldwide, reflecting local traditions:

=== France ===
In Provence, particularly at Sainte-Baume and Saint-Maximin-la-Sainte-Baume, pilgrims visit the cave and basilica associated with Mary Magdalene. Processions and Masses mark the feast, with some communities reenacting her arrival in France.

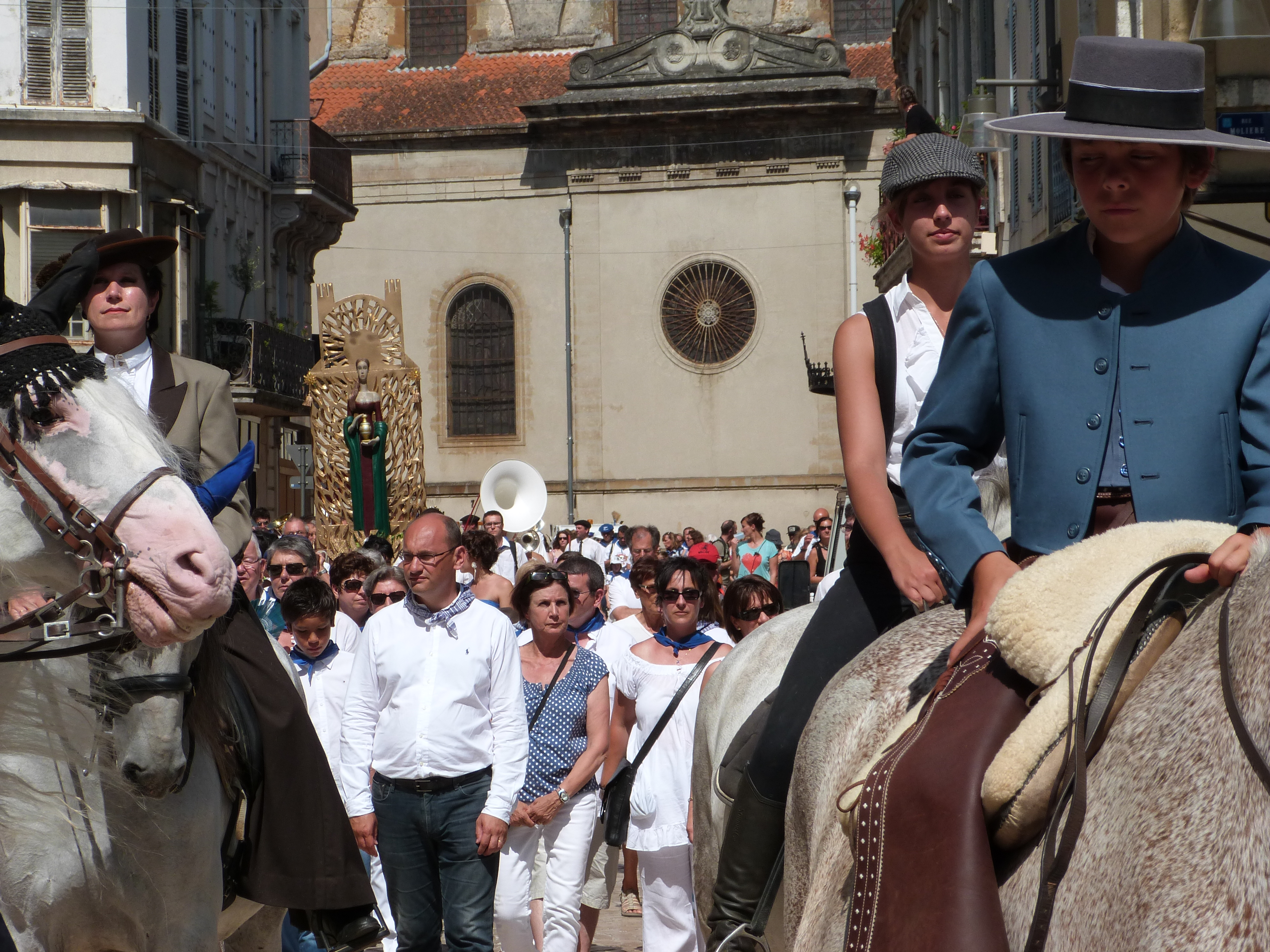
Procession in honor of Saint Mary Magdalene in the streets of Mont-de-Marsan.

In the Southwest of France, the Madeleine Festival ("Festival de la Madeleine") is a festive event combining a patronal feast and a feria in Mont-de-Marsan, the capital of the French department of Landes. Combining a funfair, street entertainment, and bullfighting, it is dedicated to Mary Magdalene, the town's patron saint and the traditional colors of blue and white, contrasting with the usual red and white of other ferios in the region.

=== Spain ===
In towns like Ronda, festivals include parades with statues of Mary Magdalene, accompanied by music and fireworks. Devotees offer flowers and candles, emphasising her penitential role. While the Magdalena Festival is celebrated in the Chapel of Mary Magadalene as the main festivity of Castellón de la Plana, the capital city of the province of Castelló, in the Valencian Community, Spain, it does not immediate recall Saint Mary Magadalene but rather the foundation of the city.

=== Philippines ===
In Catholic communities, novenas and processions honor Mary Magdalene as a patron of contemplative life and conversion. Some parishes hold dramatisations of her encounter with Jesus.

=== Italy ===
The festival of Santa Maria Madarena du boscu , which takes place in Taggia in July, has deep roots that go beyond the already ancient Christian tradition: the festival is mentioned in the statutes of Taggia as early as 1381. After 1716, with the birth of the "Maddalenanti" brotherhood, the festival took on a community character with an annual pilgrimage to the cave where, according to tradition, Mary Magdalene, around the 1st century AD, stopped before arriving in Provence where she later died.

During the Middle Ages, the famous "Fiera di Senigallia" took place as with the name of Fiera della Maddalena, in the days around the feast of Santa Maria Maddalena. The history of the Fiera di Senigallia can be dated by taking as a reference the dates of attestation of its exemption, the element that regulates its development by marking the day of beginning and end of commercial exchanges. For the Fiera della Maddalena di Senigallia, the first attestation of the celebration dates back to 1458, while the last is that of 1869, when the centuries-old celebration was abolished by the Italian unitary government.

To this day, in places like Siena, the feast is marked by special Masses and communal meals, with some communities baking breads shaped like tears to symbolise her repentance.

== Gastronomy ==
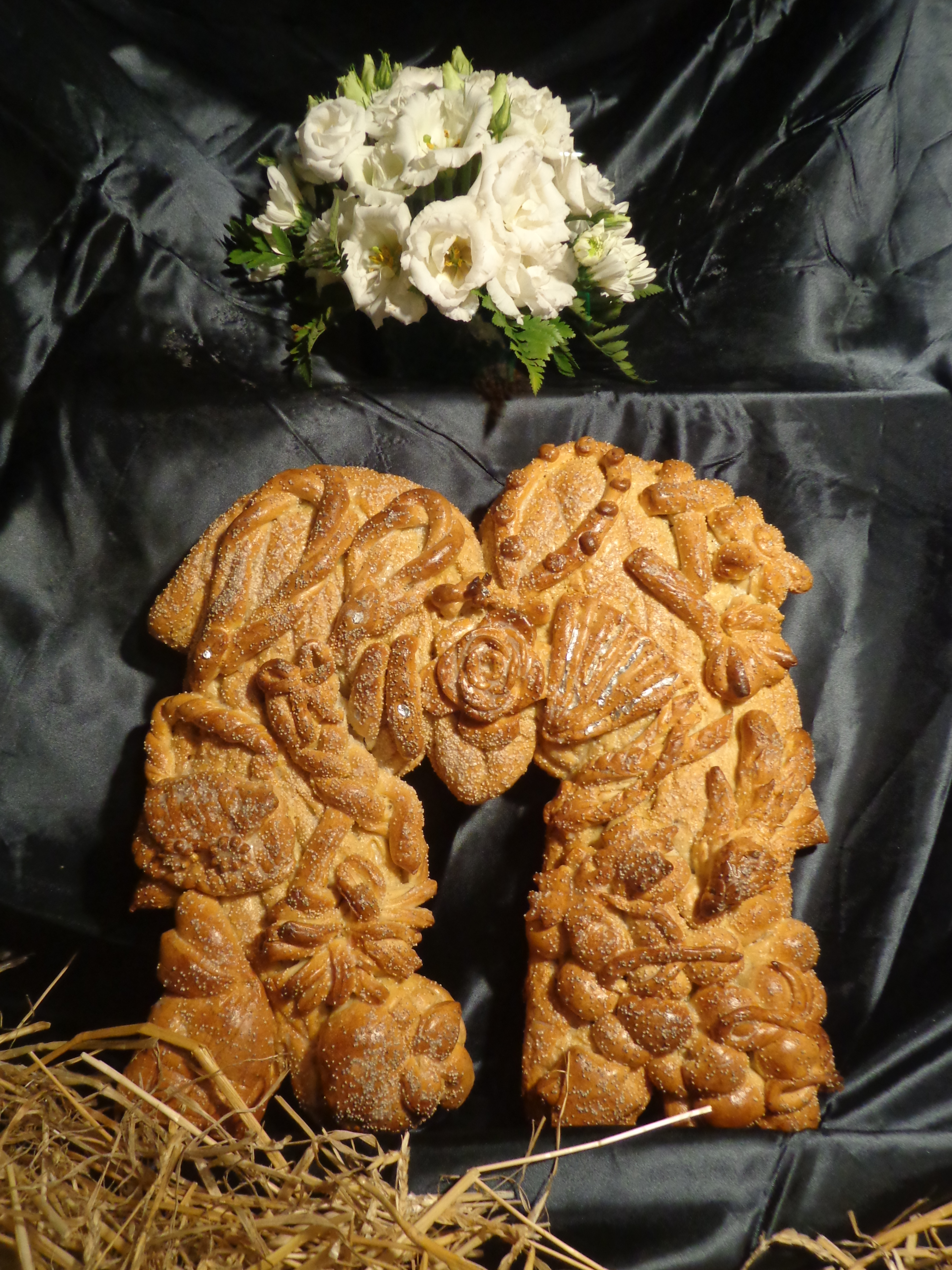
Traditional M-shaped cookies from the Comune of Rodì Milici in Sicily for the feast of Mary Magdalene.

Various delicacies are associated to the feast of Saint Mary Magdalene. In Sienna, some pasticceria bake breads shaped like tears to symbolise her repentance. In Sicily, the Cuddura of Mary Magdalene are in the shape of a capital letter M. It carries symbols of royalty and worldliness: ring, bracelet, necklace, bag and fan, earrings, and a braid, symbol of her conversion. It is half braided to symbolise her past, and half loose for her present. The Cross symbolises her presence at the foot of the cross and the grapes represent the blood of Christ.
