= John 20:11 =

- ← 20:10 20:12 →
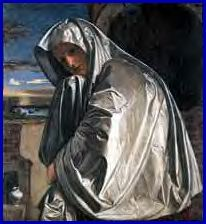
- Saint Mary Magdalene approaching the Sepulchre by Girolamo Savoldo
- Book: Gospel of John
- Christian Bible part: New Testament

John 20:11 is the eleventh verse of the twentieth chapter of the Gospel of John in the New Testament of the Christian Bible. Mary Magdalene is weeping at Jesus' tomb, Peter and the Beloved Disciple having just departed.

== Content ==
In the King James Version of the Bible the text reads:

But Mary stood without at the sepulchre weeping: and as she wept, she stooped down, and looked into the sepulchre,

The English Standard Version translates the passage as:

But Mary stood weeping outside the tomb, and as she wept she stooped to look into the tomb.

This verse refers only to "Mary", but verses 2 and 18 both refer specifically to Mary Magdalene.

For a collection of other versions see BibleHub John 20:11.

== Analysis ==
Mary has not been mentioned since verse 2, and the Gospel does not mention how she made her way back to tomb or if she was present while Peter and the Beloved Disciple were examining it. C. K. Barrett states that it is unknown whether Mary was a witness to the examination of the tomb by the two disciples who found the grave clothes still present. The presence of the clothes implies something other than a robbery, and if she was aware of them she might not have been weeping.

Why she decides to wait outside the tomb is unknown. According to William Leonard, Saint Augustine proposed that "when the men went away, a stronger affection kept the weaker sex firmly in place". John Wesley wonders whether Mary had remembered the prophecies which asserted that he would arise on the third day. F. F. Bruce believes that Mary was hoping someone would pass by who could give her some information.

Why does Mary not seek out Joseph of Arimathea, the owner of the tomb, for information? Joseph, in fact, is never again mentioned in the Gospel. One theory is that Joseph was so far above Mary's in terms of social class that it would not be right for her to disturb him.

Rudolf Schnackenburg notes that Codex Sinaiticus has Mary waiting inside the tomb, but this wording does not make much sense with regards to the succeeding verses.

Some scholars feel that Mary's peering into the tomb should follow directly after John 20:1 and see everything in between as an interjection. Raymond E. Brown has argued that John 20 is a synthesis of two sources and that they are only partially integrated. To many it seems illogical for Mary to not have actually looked into the tomb before going and telling Peter and the Beloved Disciple that Jesus' body was gone. This theory also helps explain a number of inconsistencies between John 20:2-10 and the later sections.

One of these inconsistencies is the architecture of the tomb. That Mary stooped to look into the tomb is consistent with what archaeologists know about tombs from this era. Tombs were accessed from doors at ground level which were generally less than a metre tall. These tombs either had a lone chamber for a single individual, or the entrance led to a passage lined with entrances to a number of tombs. Most accounts make it seem that Jesus was in one of the individual type tombs. However, John 20:6 mentions that Peter and the Beloved Disciple went into the tomb, implying a much larger structure that would probably not require stooping. One proposed solution is to argue that there was a large antechamber that could comfortably fit the disciples, and that the actual burial place of Jesus was in a chamber to the side.

The reformer John Calvin thinks that the other women who had witnessed the death of Jesus (John 19:25) would also have been present, along with Mary Magdelene.

Mary's weeping in this verse and subsequent ones is the origin of the word maudlin which is a corruption of the name Magdalene and refers to a person who his sorrowful.

== Bibliography ==
- Jesus Appears to His Disciples

Preceded by John 20:10	Gospel of John; Chapter 20	Succeeded by John 20:12
