= John 20:8 =

- ← 20:7 20:9 →
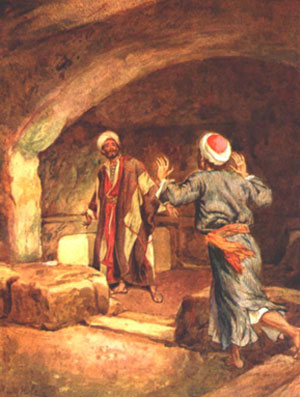
- William Hole's 1908 image of the Beloved Disciple joining Peter in the tomb.
- Book: Gospel of John
- Christian Bible part: New Testament

John 20:8 is the eighth verse of the twentieth chapter of the Gospel of John in the New Testament of the Christian Bible. Peter and the Beloved Disciple are examining Jesus's empty tomb. Peter has entered the tomb already, while the Beloved Disciple had been examining it from outside. In this verse the Beloved Disciple enters the tomb.

== Content ==
In the King James Version of the Bible the text reads:

Then went in also that other disciple, which came first to the sepulchre, and he saw, and believed.

The English Standard Version translates the passage as:

Then the other disciple, who had reached the tomb first, also went in, and he saw and believed.

For a collection of other versions see BibleHub John 20:8.

== Analysis ==
The central debate over this verse is what exactly the Beloved Disciple believed. The earlier verses mention only Jesus' grave clothes as being in the tomb. The debate is whether the Beloved Disciple could have come to believe in the resurrection based on such minimal evidence. If he did suddenly understand what had happened, why did he not share this understanding with Peter, or with Mary Magdalene who is also believed to be present? Why, after this revelation, does the Beloved Disciple simply leave to go home in John 20:10? A long line of scholars including Saint Augustine have thus argued that the Beloved Disciple simply came to believe Mary Magdalene's story that the body was gone.

The majority of scholars believe that this passage indicates the Beloved Disciple became aware of the resurrection albeit with limited understanding. The reformer John Calvin said, "it is a poor exposition which some people give of these words, that John believed what he heard Mary say namely, that Christ's body had been carried away; there is no passage in which the word 'believe' carries this meaning, especially when it is used simply and on its own". William Leonard argues that the fact that the grave clothes were left carefully in place clearly indicated that the body had not been stolen, and instead showed that Jesus had been resurrected. Bultmann believes that Peter had already realized what had happened, and in this passage the Beloved Disciple merely joins Peter in this understanding. F. F. Bruce disagrees, arguing that the scripture implies that Peter remained ignorant. Luke 24:12 has Peter leaving the scene "wondering what had happened". Most scholars who read John's verse as indicating that the Beloved Disciple understood the resurrection believe that he was the first person to reach this understanding.

Rudolf Schnackenburg takes a third approach. He argues that this passage does intend to report that Beloved Disciple understood the resurrection, but that the verse was a later addition to the text. This theory would explain why the verse does not mesh well with the rest of the narrative. The realization of the Beloved Disciple, despite its seeming importance, is not again mentioned in the narrative.

Verse 9 further complicates this debate by stating that they remained ignorant, without clearly explaining who they are.

It is also possible that the verse is an error. Brown reports that the Codex Bezae has the passage reading that "he saw and did not believe", which seems logically more in keeping with the rest of the chapter.

Another issue is what this passage reveals about the architecture of Jesus's tomb. It seems to show that two grown men could enter with ease (unless the first exited before the second entered). This is somewhat unusual as tombs in this period were generally quite small. Passages such as John 20:11 also seem to describe a smaller tomb.

Preceded by John 20:7	Gospel of John; Chapter 20	Succeeded by John 20:9
