= John 20 =

- ← chapter 19 chapter 21 →
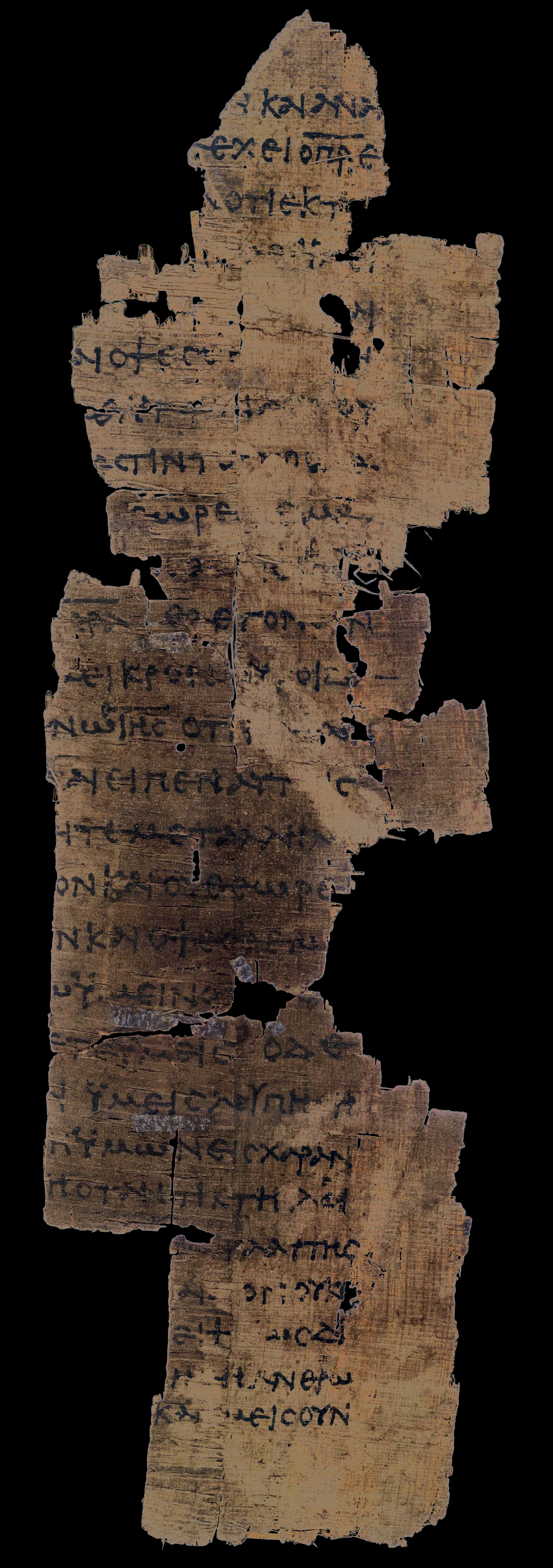
- John 16:14-22 on the recto side of Papyrus 5, written about AD 250
- Book: Gospel of John
- Category: Gospel
- Christian Bible part: New Testament
- Order in the Christian part: 4

John 20 is the twentieth chapter of the Gospel of John in the New Testament. It relates the story of Jesus' resurrection. It relates how Mary Magdalene went to the tomb of Jesus and found it empty. Jesus appears to her and speaks of his resurrection and dispatches Mary to tell the news to the disciples. Jesus then appears to his disciples. The events related in John 20 are described somewhat differently in Matthew 28, Mark 16, and Luke 24. John 20 contains a first epilogue to what the evangelist calls "this book".

== Text ==
The original text was written in Koine Greek. This chapter is divided into 31 verses.

=== Textual witnesses ===
Some early manuscripts containing the text of this chapter are:

- Papyrus 5 (c. 250; extant verses: 11–17, 19–20, 22–25)
- Codex Vaticanus (AD 325–350)
- Codex Sinaiticus (330–360)
- Codex Bezae (c. 400)
- Codex Alexandrinus (400–440)
- Codex Ephraemi Rescriptus (c. 450; extant verses: 26–31)

== Analysis ==
Tradition sites of Jesus' tomb
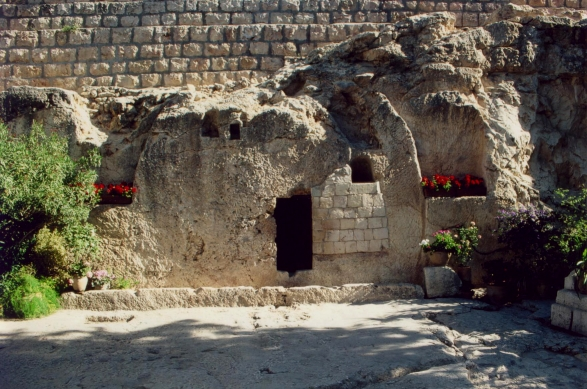
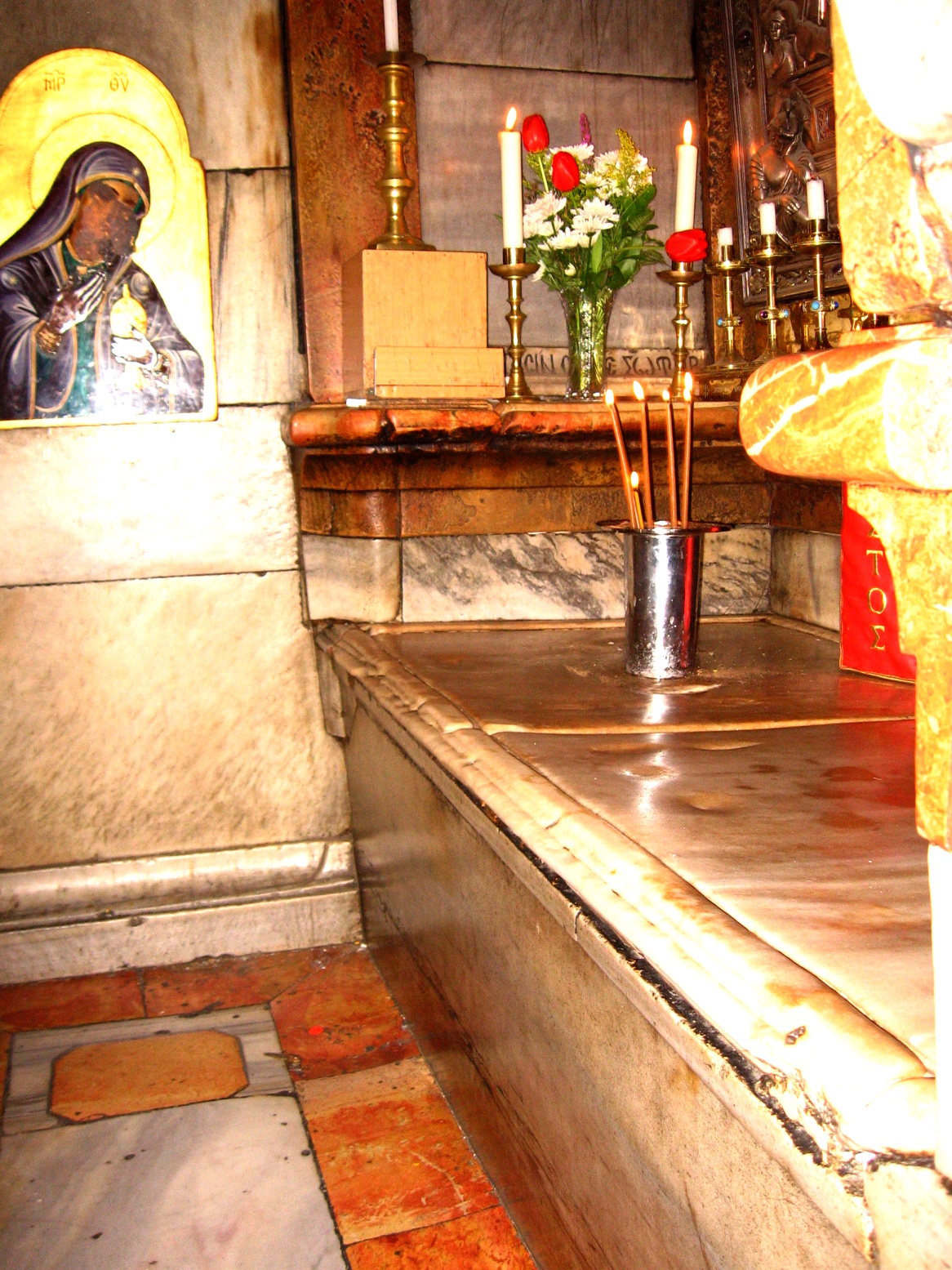
Left: outside of Garden Tomb; right: inside of the Church of the Holy Sepulchre

The chapter may be divided into three distinct sections. Verses 1-18 describe events at Jesus' tomb, when it is found to be empty, and the appearance of the risen Jesus to Mary Magdalene (see Noli me tangere). The second section (verses 19-29) describes Jesus' appearances to his disciples, while the final two verses (30 and 31) relate why the author wrote this gospel. The first section can also be subdivided between the examination of the tomb by Peter and the Beloved Disciple and Christ's appearance to Mary. For the editors of the New American Bible Revised Edition, this chapter "fulfills the basic need for testimony to the resurrection", which it does via "a series of stories".

There are several inconsistencies both within the chapter and between it and the resurrection account in the other gospels. Raymond E. Brown has advanced the thesis that the work is a melding of two different sources. One source originally contained verses 1 and 11 to 18 and described Mary Magdalene's trip the tomb. This information is unique to John. Another had verses 3 to 10 and 19 to the end and dealt with the disciples. This portion is far more similar to the synoptic gospels, suggesting that this is merely the synoptics rewritten to make it seem like it was an eyewitness account. The portion on Mary Magdalene, by contrast, had to have been based on sources that only John had access to.

Theologian C. H. Dodd states that the crucifixion is the climax of John's narrative and argues that this chapter is written as the dénouement and conclusion. John 20 contains a first epilogue to what the evangelist calls "this book". Verse 31 is considered to be "the shortest summary of Johannine theology", such that to expound each word or phrase in detail requires one to expound the whole book. The combination of Jesus' "Messiahship and divine sonship" becomes the ultimate conclusion of the presentation of Jesus in this gospel.

== Verses ==
- John 20:1
- John 20:2
- John 20:3
- John 20:4
- John 20:5
- John 20:6
- John 20:7
- John 20:8
- John 20:9
- John 20:10
- John 20:11
- John 20:12
- John 20:13
- John 20:14
- John 20:15
- John 20:16
- John 20:17
- John 20:18
- John 20:19
- John 20:20
- John 20:21
- John 20:22
- John 20:23
- John 20:24
- John 20:25
- John 20:26
- John 20:27
- John 20:28
- John 20:29
- John 20:30
- John 20:31

== Sources ==
- Carson, D. A. (1991). The Gospel According to John. Pillar New Testament commentary (reprint ed.). Wm. B. Eerdmans Publishing. pp. 660–661. ISBN 9780851117492.
- Guthrie, Donald (1994). "John". In Carson, D. A.; France, R. T.; Motyer, J. A.; Wenham, G. J. (eds.). New Bible Commentary: 21st Century Edition (4, illustrated, reprint, revised ed.). Inter-Varsity Press. pp. 1021–1065. ISBN 9780851106489.

| Preceded by John 19 | Chapters of the Bible; Gospel of John | Succeeded by John 21 |
