= John 20:7 =

- ← 20:6 20:8 →
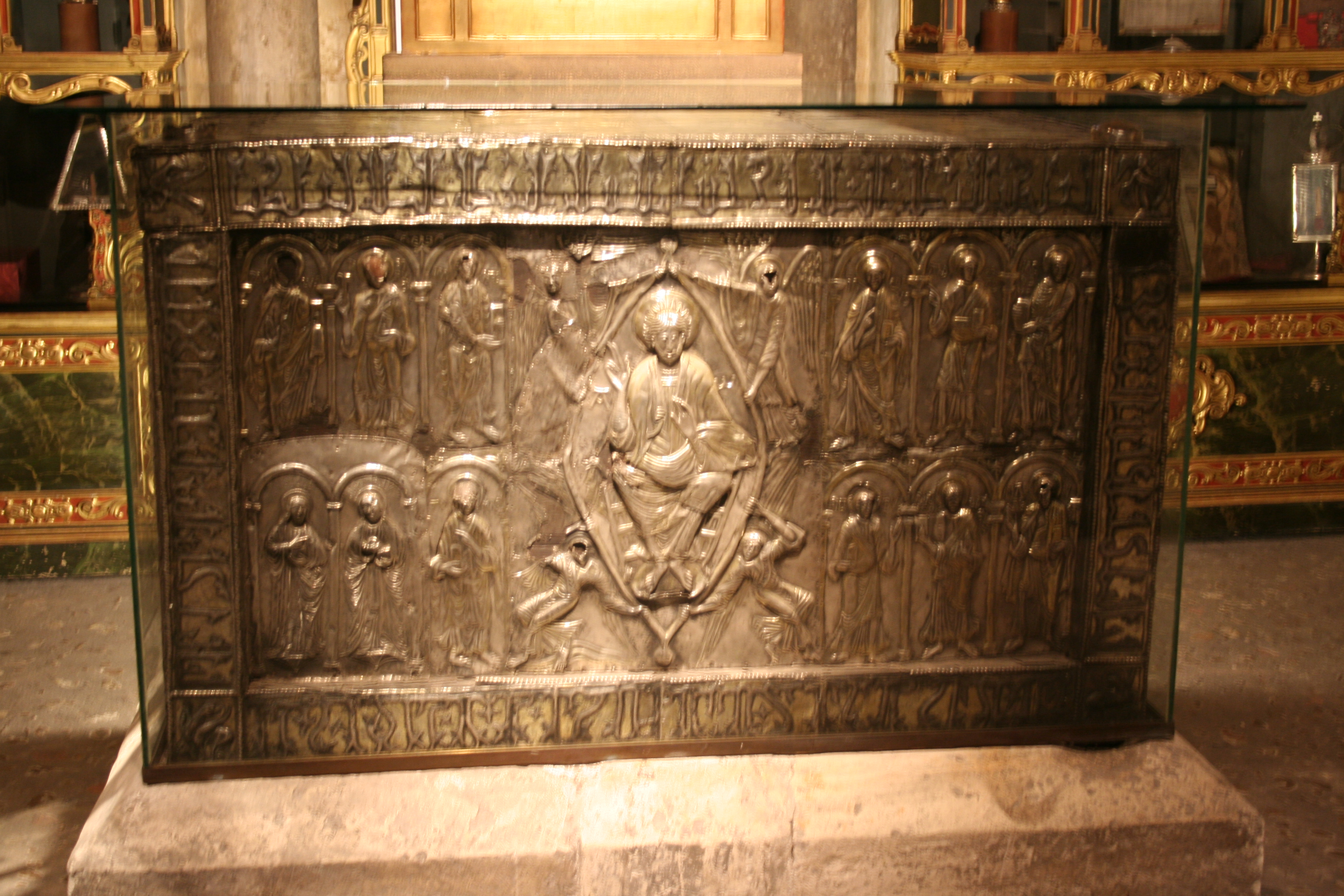
- The ark that contains the Sudarium of Oviedo.
- Book: Gospel of John
- Christian Bible part: New Testament

John 20:7 is the seventh verse of the twentieth chapter of the Gospel of John in the Bible. In this verse, Peter is standing in Jesus's empty tomb. The Beloved Disciple and perhaps Mary Magdalene are outside. This verse describes the arrangement of the grave clothes they see.

== Content ==
In the King James Version of the Bible the text reads:

And the napkin, that was about his head, not lying with the linen clothes, but wrapped together in a place by itself.

The English Standard Version translates the passage as:

and the face cloth, which had been on Jesus' head, not lying with the linen cloths but folded up in a place by itself.

Verses 6 and 7 are combined as a single sentence in many translations. The Evangelical Heritage Version is an exception, where verses 6 and 7 constitute distinct sentences. For a collection of other versions see BibleHub John 20:7.

== Analysis ==
The translation and meaning of this verse are much debated. The napkin/face cloth in Greek is a σουδαριον (soudarion), from the Latin sudarium, literally a "sweat rag", a piece of cloth used to wipe the sweat from one's brow. Most scholars believe that it refers to a cloth wrapped around the head of the deceased. Lazarus' face had been wrapped in a σουδαριον in John 11:44. The word σουδαριον is used in a different manner in Luke 19:20, where a servant uses one to wrap his money.

The exact relationship between this headpiece and the other clothes is not certain. The passage can be read either as meaning the cloth is not in the same location of the others or as meaning the cloth is not lying in the same manner of the others. Is the cloth separated from the others, and if so where is it? One interpretation is that this separation merely reflects the distance from the head to the torso. Others see the cloth as being moved to a part of the burial place or tomb well away from the other cloths. Those who believe the phrase is closer to "not lying like" believe that it simply refers to the head cloth being in a ball rather than lying flat like the others. Also, the words translated "wrapped together", and "rolled up" are from the Greek word pronounced (en-too-lis'-so) #1794. And this Greek word is from #1722 which has a meaning "Eliptical", as an oval. This is a much different view of what John saw when he went in and believed. Taking in consideration John already believed Jesus was the Christ, there was something unusual he saw which made him believe that Jesus had indeed risen from the dead.

The two different readings imply two visions of the resurrection, an event which is never directly described in the New Testament, although it is described in the Gospel of Peter. If the head cloth remained in the same location where Jesus's head had lain, it suggests that the resurrection process saw Jesus lifted through his clothing or that he dematerialized while in them. If the head cloth had been balled up and put to the side, it suggests that Jesus returned to life while lying in the clothes and himself removed the wrapping from his head leaving it beside him.

Rudolf Schnackenburg compares this to the resurrection of Lazarus. The revived Lazarus needed aid in removing his grave goods while Jesus transcended them.

A side issue is that if the grave clothes were abandoned by the risen Jesus, what was he then wearing? To Kastner, this is evidence that Jesus was naked upon his resurrection. Most other scholars reject this theory, arguing that providing a new set of clothing would be a comparatively minor issue beside raising Jesus from the dead. Alternatively, there could have been multiple layers of cloth wrapping Jesus and he kept wearing one of these while abandoning the others.

The level of detail the author of John adds to this section is, to Brooke Foss Westcott, evidence that the author was an eyewitness to the events described, and therefore that the Beloved Disciple was the author of John. C.K. Barrett disagrees. He argues that such details are exactly what a modern author adds to a fictional account to give it a feeling of verisimilitude, and there is no reason to believe an ancient writer would not have these same skills. To Dodd, the level of detail reflects the narrative arc of the Gospel of John. Dodd argues the crucifixion is the climax of the work and that these later sections are the dénouement and that the author thus deliberately slows the pace of the narrative. Schnackenberg sees the level of detail as apologetic in origin. To him, the detailed description is an attempt to disprove the allegation that Jesus's tomb had simply been robbed.

== Artefacts ==
The Shroud of Turin is said to be one of the linens left behind by Jesus, while the head cloth is said to be the Sudarium of Oviedo, although the veracity of these claims is doubted by many. In the work Asarim, the Sudarium is described as a Turban. It can be seen in the Cathedral of Oviedo in Spain.

Preceded by John 20:6	Gospel of John; Chapter 20	Succeeded by John 20:8
