= John 20:12 =

- ← 20:11 20:13 →
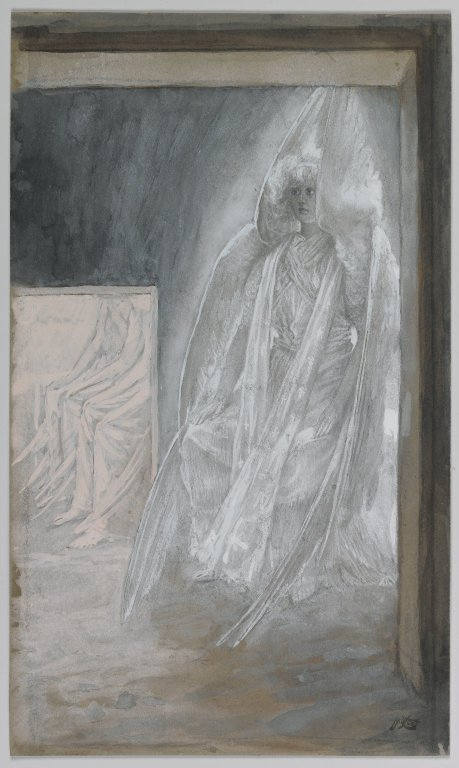
- James Tissot's The Angel Seated on the Stone of the Tomb.
- Book: Gospel of John
- Christian Bible part: New Testament

John 20:12 is the twelfth verse of the twentieth chapter of the Gospel of John in the New Testament of the Christian Bible. Mary Magdalene is peering into the empty tomb of Jesus and sees two angels.

== Content ==
In the King James Version of the Bible the text reads:

And seeth two angels in white sitting, the one at the head, and the other at the feet, where the body of Jesus had lain.

The English Standard Version translates the passage as:

And she saw two angels in white, sitting where the body of Jesus had lain, one at the head and one at the feet.

For a collection of other versions see BibleHub John 20:12.

== Analysis ==
There are some discrepancies between this account and that of the other gospels. In Matthew 28:2-7, only a single angel is mentioned. Mark 16 refers to a young man, presumably an angel, sitting on the right side. In Luke's account, two men, identified as angels in Luke 24:23, appear standing next to the women. Those who believe in the inerrancy of the Bible argue that these multiple accounts are explained by Mary making multiple trips to the tomb.

This is the only time in the Gospel of John that angels appear. Rationalist critics believe that there were never any angels and that they were a later embellishment to the tale. Rudolf Schnackenburg argues that the angels were a later addition to the narrative. He argues they were added to reinforce the evidence that the body of Jesus was gone. By indicating that the angels were sitting where the head and feet of Jesus were, the narrative shows that a full examination of the spot had been conducted. This also explains why the angels are so quickly forgotten later in the chapter.

Some writers have linked the two angels guarding the tomb with the pair who were said to guard the Ark of the Covenant. Johann Jakob Wettstein advanced a thesis linking the pair of angels to the pair of criminals who were crucified alongside Jesus.

The angels appear in the standard attire of biblical angels, who are always portrayed as either wearing white or radiant clothing. The exact form of the angels is uncertain. The text does not make clear if they were in the form of normal men, who Mary did perhaps not recognize as angels, or if they were the radiant beings biblical angels are often described as.

The position of the angels says something about the tomb. That they are sitting on something seems to imply that Jesus' body was on a raised shelf or ledge. This is consistent with the rest of the Gospel. However, early pilgrims to Jesus' tomb report that his body was placed in a trough in the tomb. F. F. Bruce argues that the grave may very well have been a trough, as "angels would not require the same material support as beings of flesh and blood." Some scholars believe that the clear distinction between the head and foot indicates that Jesus' tomb was one that had a built-in headrest. Others believe the writer is just referring to the direction in which Jesus had been placed.

Another question is why the angels failed to appear to the disciples when they examined the tomb. Brooke Foss Westcott explains this by arguing that "such manifestations necessarily follow the laws of a spiritual economy".

== Bibliography ==
- Brown, Raymond E. "The Gospel According to John: XIII-XI" The Anchor Bible Series Volume 29A New York: Doubleday & Company, 1970.
- John Calvin's Commentary on John 20:10-15
- Jesus Appears to His Disciples

Preceded by John 20:11	Gospel of John; Chapter 20	Succeeded by John 20:13
