= John 20:5 =

- ← 20:4 20:6 →
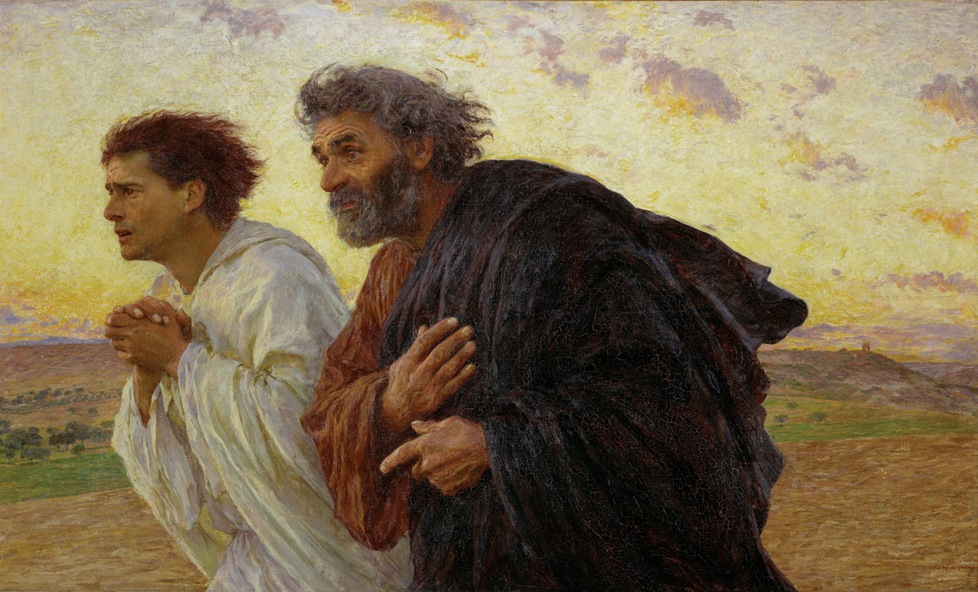
- The disciples Peter and John running to the tomb on the morning of the resurrection. Painting by Eugène Burnand (1898)
- Book: Gospel of John
- Christian Bible part: New Testament

John 20:5 is the fifth verse of the twentieth chapter of the Gospel of John in the Bible. The Beloved Disciple and Peter have travelled to the tomb of Jesus to investigate Mary Magdalene's report that the body of Jesus had disappeared. In this verse, the Beloved Disciple arrives at the tomb; he looks in, but he does not enter it.

== Content ==
In the King James Version of the Bible, the text reads:

And he stooping down, and looking in, saw the linen clothes lying; yet went he not in.

The English Standard Version translates the passage as:

And stooping to look in,
he saw the linen cloths lying there,
but he did not go in.

The International Standard Version's text reads:

Bending over to look inside, he noticed the linen cloths lying there, but didn't go in.

For a collection of other versions, see BibleHub John 20:5.

== Analysis ==
C. K. Barrett reports that the term that is translated as "stooping" or "bending over" is one that is most often used to refer to looking down from a height. This would imply that Jesus' tomb is a vertical shaft like grave. The rest of the passage verse suggests a tomb that is more like a cave. However, the word can also refer to any looking that requires the head to be bent. Tombs of this period generally had an entrance that was less than a meter high, which would thus require some contortion to peer in. The word that describes John looking at the grave clothes implies a more short glance rather than a detailed examination.

The main unanswered question about this passage is why the Beloved Disciple pauses outside the tomb. One theory is that he is deferring to Peter, as the junior disciple the Beloved Disciple pauses to allow Peter to be the first into the tomb. Another notion is that the Beloved Disciple paused because entering a tomb at this point would be a violation of ritual: perhaps his concern was with respecting the burial place of his lord. Most scholars believe the first explanation is the most likely, as the Beloved Disciple does enter the tomb soon after in John 20:8.

== Bibliography ==
- John Calvin's commentary on John 20:1-9
- Jesus Appears to His Disciples

Preceded by John 20:4	Gospel of John; Chapter 20	Succeeded by John 20:6
