= John 20:3–4 =

- ← 20:2 20:5 →
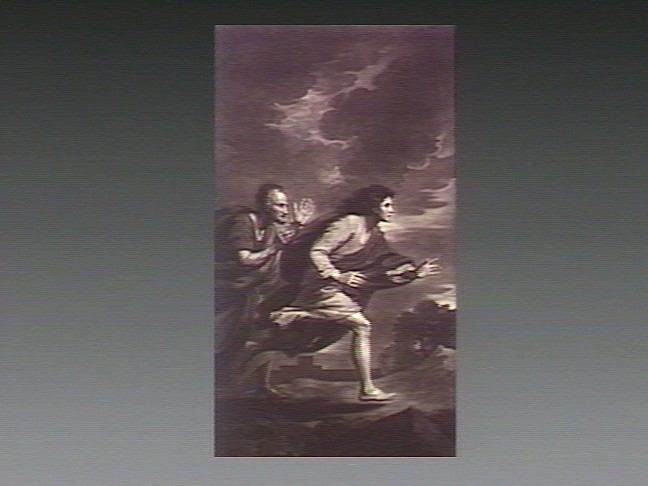
- Peter and John run to the tomb of Christ. Mezzotint by Valentine Green, 1784
- Book: Gospel of John
- Christian Bible part: New Testament

John 20:3–4 are the third and fourth verses of the twentieth chapter of the Gospel of John in the New Testament. Peter and the Beloved Disciple have been informed by Mary Magdalene that Jesus' tomb has been opened and in these verses they depart for the tomb.

== Content ==
In the King James Version of the Bible the text reads:

^{3} Peter therefore went forth, and that other disciple, and came to the sepulchre. ^{4} So they ran both together: and the other disciple did outrun Peter, and came first to the sepulchre.

The English Standard Version translates the passage as:

^{3} So Peter went out with the other disciple, and they were going toward the tomb. ^{4} Both of them were running together, but the other disciple outran Peter and reached the tomb first.

For a collection of other versions, see BibleHub John 20:3- 20:4.

== Sources ==
The Gospels of Matthew and Mark have no accounts of disciples visiting Jesus' empty tomb: in those two gospels only the women go there. To Rudolf Bultmann, the passage beginning at verse 3 is an insertion by the author of John to the existing framework of Mark and Matthew, one that makes little sense considering the commission given to Mary Magdalene at John 20:17.

The parallel with Luke's Gospel is more complicated. The prevailing theory is that Luke and John wrote their gospels independently and did not have access to each other's gospels. These verses share many words and language with Luke 24:24, with Luke abbreviating the more detailed account in John. One suggestion is that the author of John may have been working from a version of Luke for this verse, despite few signs of such references elsewhere in John. Another possibility is that these parts of Luke are missing from several early manuscripts, so while it is understood that Luke was written earlier than John, the passages in Luke 24 that share language with these verses could be later insertions from an author who was referencing John.

One oddity is that the verb έξήλθεν (came) in verse 3 is singular, despite referring to two disciples. To several scholars this is a clue that the presence of John himself ("the Beloved Disciple") is an insertion and that the core text derived from Mark or Luke only referred to Peter.

== Interpretations ==
John Calvin notes the zeal that causes the two disciples to depart immediately to inspect the situation when they hear the news of the opened tomb. It is never explained why the disciples move from travelling into running. It is often speculated that the tomb has come within sight and the two only run the last stretch. The act of running shows the deep concern the disciples had for the fate of Jesus' body.

Brooke Foss Westcott notes that the passage clearly indicates that Peter takes the lead and the Beloved Disciple merely follows him. The main issue of interpretation is why the Beloved Disciple out-races Peter to the tomb. Some scholars have seen this as a metaphor, elevating the Beloved Disciple over Peter, the latter perhaps being denigrated for his actions around the crucifixion. Many scholars disagree with this view. The tradition that the Beloved Disciple was the author of John made it necessary for him to be considerably younger than Peter. His youthful vigour is thus a common explanation for why he beats Peter. The Disciple's great love for Jesus is also considered as a possible explanation.

The Beloved Disciple is referred to in verse 3 as the "other disciple". This can be considered proof that the person referred to as the "other disciple" in John 18 is also the Beloved Disciple, the title used for John the claimed author of the gospel.

== Bibliography ==
- John Calvin's commentary on John 20:1-9
- Jesus Appears to His Disciples

Preceded by John 20:2	Gospel of John; Chapter 20	Succeeded by John 20:5
