= John 20:6 =

- ← 20:5 20:7 →
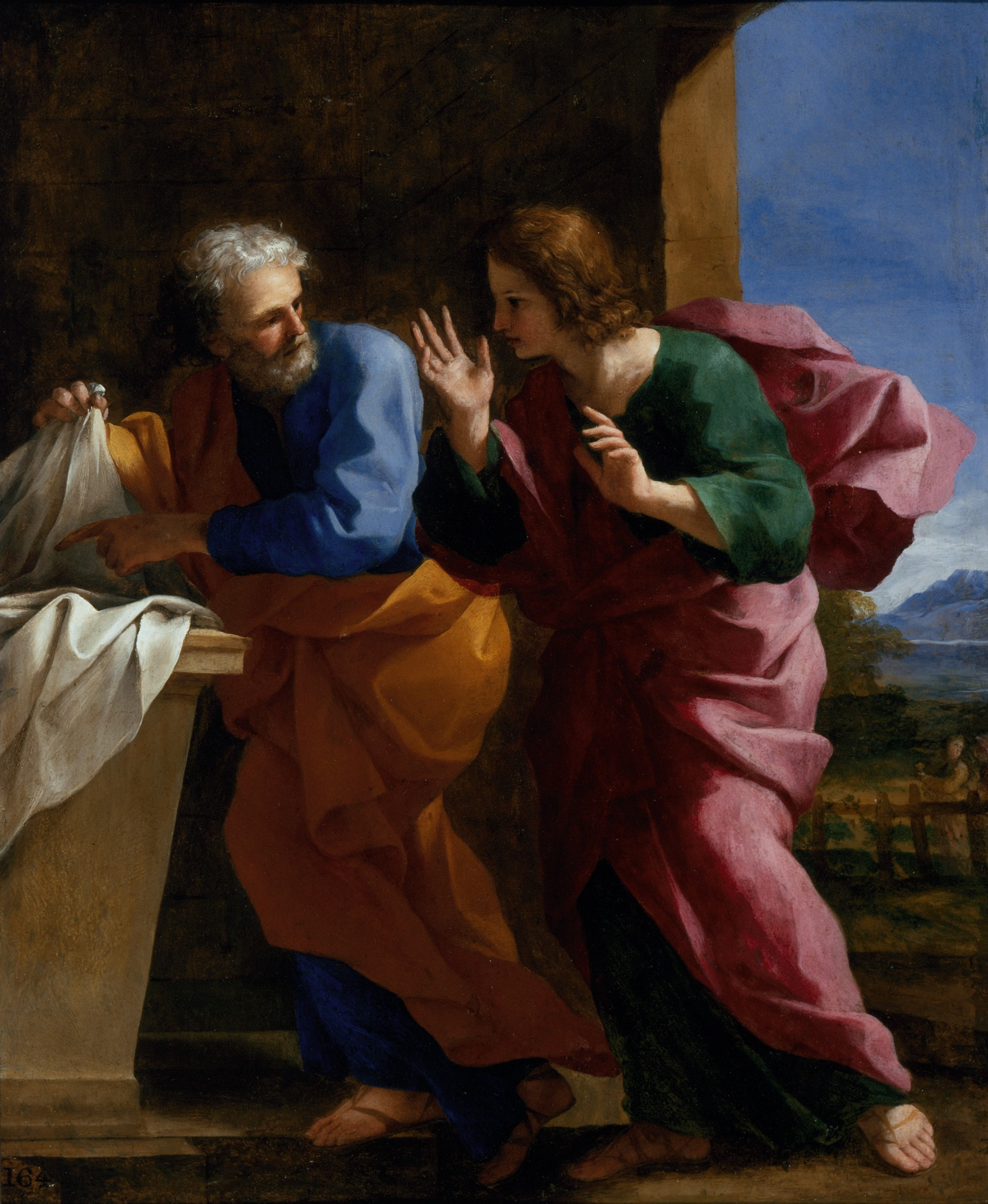
- St. John and St. Peter at Christ's Tomb. Painting by Giovanni Francesco Romanelli (Italy, Viterbo, circa 1640)
- Book: Gospel of John
- Christian Bible part: New Testament

John 20:6 is the sixth verse of the twentieth chapter of the Gospel of John in the Bible. Peter and the Beloved Disciple have just arrived at the empty tomb of Jesus. The Beloved Disciple, who arrived slightly ahead of Peter, paused outside the empty tomb. In the verse, Peter enters the tomb upon his arrival.

== Content ==
In the King James Version of the Bible, the text reads:

Then cometh Simon Peter following him, and went into the sepulchre, and seeth the linen clothes lie,

The English Standard Version translates the passage as:

Then Simon Peter came, following him, and went into the tomb. He saw the linen cloths lying there,

Verse 7 is combined with verse 6 as a single sentence in many translations. The Evangelical Heritage Version is an exception, where verses 6 and 7 constitute distinct sentences. For a collection of other versions see BibleHub John 20:6.

== Analysis ==
Although Peter arrived second, he enters the tomb first. To F. F. Bruce, Peter's entry into the tomb as soon as he arrives shows his "characteristic impetuosity"; John Chrysostom refers to Peter's "more fervid temper". That Peter enters the tomb without trepidation or hesitation is seen by other scholars as an indication that he was not greatly affected by guilt due to the events surrounding the crucifixion. C. K. Barrett states that the passage is an attempt to subordinate the Beloved Disciple to Peter and make up for the disciple beating Peter in the race for the tomb.

The word translated as "seeth" or "saw" (θεωρει, theōrei) is closer to "examine", implying that Peter is paying detailed attention to the strips of linen. This contrasts with the previous verse, where the Greek implies the Beloved Disciple gave a much shorter glance to the linens.

The strips of linen presumably refer to the grave clothes of Jesus, which are discussed in greater detail in verse 7. Some translators believe "lying there" is best interpreted as "lying on the ground". Raymond E. Brown disagrees, reading this turn of phrase as evidence that the grave clothes were sitting upon a shelf in the tomb. It is notable that John refers to the grave clothes as "strips". In Luke's Gospel and traditionally, Jesus's body was wrapped by Joseph of Arimathea in a shroud. For John Chrysostom, greater significance is attached to the fact that they were left there: if someone had taken Jesus' body away, "they would not have stripped Him", nor would they "have taken the trouble to wrap up the napkin, and put it in a place by itself, apart from the linen clothes".

== See also ==
- Shroud of Turin
- Sudarium of Oviedo

Preceded by John 20:5	Gospel of John; Chapter 20	Succeeded by John 20:7
