= John 20:2 =

- ← 20:1 20:3 →
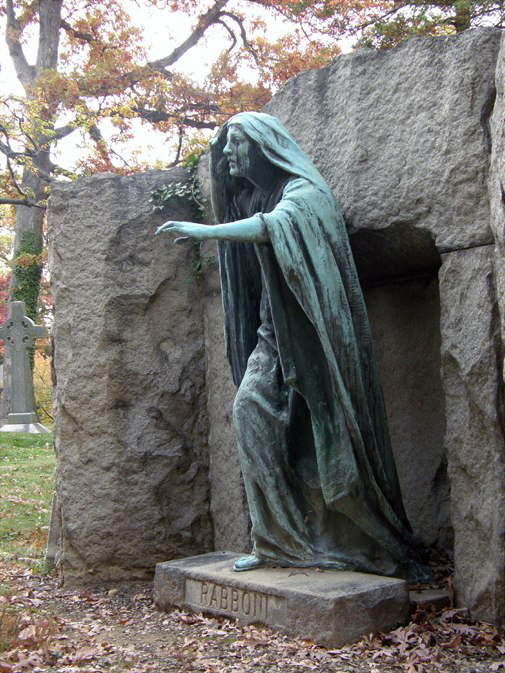
- The Rabboni sculpture by Gutzon Borglum, depicts Mary Magdalene emerging from the empty tomb of Christ on Easter.
- Book: Gospel of John
- Christian Bible part: New Testament

John 20:2 is the second verse of the twentieth chapter of the Gospel of John in the New Testament. Mary Magdalene has just discovered that the tomb of Jesus has been opened. In this verse she seeks out Peter and the "disciple whom Jesus loved" to tell them that Jesus' body has been removed.

== Content ==
The English Standard Version translates this verse as:

So she ran and went to Simon Peter and the other disciple, the one whom Jesus loved, and said to them, "They have taken the Lord out of the tomb, and we do not know where they have laid him."

== Analysis ==
John probably refers to the angel's message in Mark 16:7, where he has Mary inform Peter and the other disciple. Rudolf Schnackenburg notes that the double-barreled name Simon Peter is how the Gospel of John usually refers to Peter.

This is the third appearance of the Beloved Disciple in John, he also appears in John 13:23 and John 19:26. The introduction of the Beloved Disciple leads to two starkly different views on the veracity of the passage and those that come later. To those who believe in the traditional view that the Beloved Disciple is the author of the Gospel it adds great weight to what comes next as it is the report of an eyewitness.

Richard Francis Weymouth interprets Mary's response as urgent: "So she ran, as fast as she could". Similarly, William Robertson Nicoll sees Mary as "breathless and anxious" when she meets the apostles. She refers to they, but she does not make clear who "they" are. Brooke Foss Westcott lists three possibilities:

- she might mean grave robbers: grave robbery was a problem in Palestine during this era, as a Roman first century edict condemning the practice makes clear, or
- they could also refer to the Jewish leaders who may have had a reason to take the body.

Some feel the "we don't know where they have put him" makes it possible that they refers to the grave keepers and that Jesus' body was merely shifted to another tomb. Raymond E. Brown notes that the verb tithenai, which is translated as laid/put, can also mean buried. However, if Mary was thinking the body had merely been shifted by workers it raises the question of why she is so concerned, and why Peter and the Beloved Disciple so quickly leave to investigate.

Jesus was called by Mary as lord, a title that previously had not been used by Jesus' followers in John. Some, such as Brown, see this as evidence that this section was written by a different author from the rest of the gospel. An alternative theory is that the new title is permissible now that Jesus is dead.

Mary thinks that grave-robbers or the authorities have stolen the body, whereas Matthew 28:11–15 mentions the allegation by the Jews that the disciples stole the body.

Mary states that "we don't know where they have put him." However the previous verse only mentioned Mary being at the tomb. Many scholars link this to the synoptic gospels where Mary is described as going to the grave with a group of other women. To those who believe in the inerrancy of the Bible this is evidence that the other women were in fact with Mary, but the author of John did not feel it was necessary to mention them. Some early versions of the gospel have "I" instead of "we", but Brown does not think it means much as the rest of the passage remains unaltered.

== Sources ==
- Kieffer, René (2007). "60. John". In Barton, John; Muddiman, John (eds.). The Oxford Bible Commentary (first (paperback) ed.). Oxford University Press. pp. 960–1000. ISBN 978-0199277186.

Preceded by John 20:1	Gospel of John; Chapter 20	Succeeded by John 20:3
