= Timothy J. McGrew =

American professor of philosophy

Timothy Joel McGrew is a professor of philosophy at Western Michigan University, and the chair of the department of philosophy there. His research interests include epistemology, the history and philosophy of science, and the philosophy of religion. He is a specialist in the philosophical applications of probability theory.

== Career ==
McGrew graduated from the University of Scranton in Pennsylvania with a B.A. in Philosophy (summa cum laude, 1988). He went on to earn an MA (1991) and a PhD (1992) in philosophy at Vanderbilt University.

He taught as an assistant professor at Washington State University for three years (1992-1995), before joining Western Michigan University in 1995, where he held an assistant professorship for four years (1995-1999), then an associate professorship for six years (1999-2005). He became a full professor, and chairman of the Department of Philosophy at Western Michigan University in 2005, a position that he presently holds.

== Research interests ==
In epistemology, McGrew works on foundationalism, internalist and externalist theories of epistemic justification, theories of rationality, a priori knowledge, objectivity and relativism, formal and performative self-refutation, perceptual knowledge and the given, and metaepistemology. His interests in the philosophy of science include models of explanation, simplicity, probability, falsifiability and rational theory choice, history of science and rational reconstruction, logic, realism and contemporary physics, and the mathematics and philosophy of cosmological fine-tuning.

In probability theory, McGrew has published on induction and statistical inference, Bayesian confirmation theory, and probabilistic models of explanatory reasoning.

His interests in the history of science include developments in physics among the Muslim scholars of the Middle Ages, astronomy and dynamics from Aristotle through Isaac Newton, particles, waves, the development of optics between the years 1660 and 1850, the fall of the ether theory, and the advent of relativity.

In the philosophy of religion, McGrew focuses on historical arguments for and against miraculous claims, natural theology and atheology, and ramified natural theology.

== Personal life ==
McGrew is married to Lydia McGrew and they have three children.

He is a chess master and was the Michigan Chess co-champion in 2006, and his daughter Bethel, who has a Ph.D. in mathematics, was one of the top thirty female blitz players in the USA. He was one of the commentators online who discovered the missed draw in the second game of the 1997 match between Garry Kasparov and Deep Blue.

== Publications ==
Besides numerous articles and book chapters, McGrew has published and/or edited four books:

- Philosophy of Science: An Historical Anthology. Co-edited with Marc Alspector-Kelly and Fritz Allhoff. (Blackwell 2009)
- Internalism and Epistemology: The Architecture of Reason. With Lydia McGrew. (Routledge 2007)
- The Foundations of Knowledge. Littlefield Adams Books, 1995.
