= John 20:1 =

- ← chapter 19 20:2 →
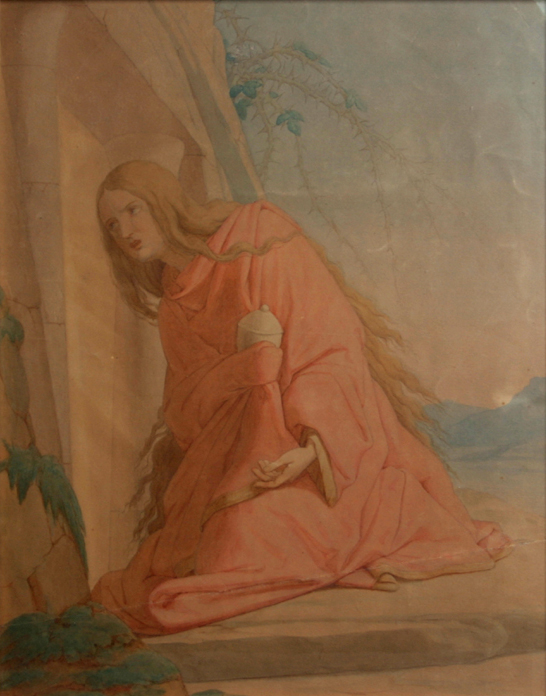
- Mary Magdalene at the tomb, by Joseph von Führich
- Book: Gospel of John
- Christian Bible part: New Testament

John 20:1 is the first verse of the twentieth chapter of the Gospel of John in the New Testament. John 20 covers the resurrection of Jesus after his crucifixion. In this verse Mary Magdalene visits Jesus' tomb and finds it opened.

== Content ==
In the King James Version of the Bible,, the text reads:

The first day of the week cometh Mary Magdalene early, when it was yet dark, unto the sepulchre, and seeth the stone taken away from the sepulchre.

The World English Bible translates the passage as:

Now on the first day of the week,
Mary Magdalene went early,
while it was still dark,
to the tomb, and saw the
stone taken away from the tomb.

For a collection of other versions, see BibleHub John 20:1.

== Analysis ==
The "first day of the week" refers to the first day after the Sabbath, the modern Sunday and the third day after Jesus' crucifixion. However, as Mary went while it was still dark, the word day cannot refer to the Jewish day which begins at sunset. That it is still dark seems to conflict with Mark 16:1 and Luke 24:1, which both mention that it was light. William Leonard believes this can be explained by having John describing the time of departure and the other two describing the time of arrival. A more complex solution, but one that can also help explain other inconsistencies in the chapter, is that Mary made two different trips to the tomb one while it was dark and the other at dawn. This can also explain why the other Gospels have Mary in a group of women and John has her alone.

Raymond E. Brown reports that the Codex Sinaiticus does not add the word "Magdalene", describing the woman only as "Mary". In the early church a parallel tradition existed that it was Mary, the mother of Jesus, who is referred to in this passage. Ephrem's On the Diatessaron uses this version of the story. Loisy believes that this was the original version and the Virgin was later replaced by Mary Magdalene to make John match the other three gospels more closely. Brown notes that nowhere else in the Gospel is Jesus' mother referred to simply as Mary, making this theory, for him, less likely.

Unlike the other gospels, John does not mention why Mary comes to the tomb. Mark 16:1 and Luke 24:1 say that the women came to the tomb to continue the burial rituals. Matthew 28:1 mentions that the trip was to look at the tomb. John 19 makes it seem as though the burial preparations were already complete. Brown thus thinks that the Gospel of Peter's story that she came simply to mourn is more likely. The Midrash Rabbah states that Rabbi Bar Kappera was of the opinion that mourning should peak on the third day. Bernard considers the whole trip improbable as it is highly unlikely that a lone woman would go to a place of execution outside the city walls while it was still dark.

The Gospel of John is equally spartan when talking of the tomb. He refers to simply "the stone" assuming the reader knows what stone is being referred to. While the other three gospels mention that the stone had been rolled away, John only states that it was moved.

== Bibliography ==
- Barrett, C.K. The Gospel According to John, 2nd Edition. London: SPCK, 1978.
- Brown, Raymond E. "The Gospel According to John: XIII-XI" The Anchor Bible Series Volume 29A. New York: Doubleday & Company, 1970.
- Bruce, F.F. The Gospel According to John, Grand Rapids: William B. Eerdmans Publishing Company, 1983.
- Leonard, W. "St. John." A Catholic Commentary on the Bible. D.B. Orchard ed. New York: Thomas Nelson & Sons, 1953.
- Schnackenberg, Rudolf . The Gospel According to St. John: Volume III. Crossroad, 1990.
- John Calvin's commentary on John 20:1-9
- Jesus Appears to His Disciples

Preceded by John 19:42	Gospel of John; Chapter 20	Succeeded by John 20:2
