= Rudolf Schnackenburg =

German Catholic priest and scholar (1914–2002)

- Born: 5 January 1914; Kattowitz, Upper Silesia, Prussia
- Died: 28 August 2002 (aged 88); Würzburg, Germany
- Known for: Das Johannesevangelium, Herders theologischer Kommentar zum Neuen Testament
- Awards: Recipient of the Order of Merit of the Federal Republic of Germany

Academic background
- Education: University of Breslau; Ludwig-Maximilians-Universität München
- Doctoral advisor: Friedrich Wilhelm Maier

Academic work
- Discipline: Theology; New Testament
- Institutions: University of Würzburg
- Influenced: Josef Ratzinger, Benedict Groeschel

Rudolf Schnackenburg (5 January 1914 – 28 August 2002) was a German Catholic priest and New Testament scholar. Joseph Ratzinger referred to him as "probably the most significant German-speaking Catholic exegete of the second half of the twentieth century."

== Life ==
Schnackenburg spent his childhood in Liegnitz and finished secondary school there (at the "Gymnasium Johanneum") in 1932. He then studied philosophy and theology at the University of Breslau and at the Ludwig-Maximilians-Universität München. In 1937, he earned his doctoral degree from the University of Breslau for a dissertation written under Friedrich Wilhelm Maier on "faith" in the Gospel of John. In the same year, he was ordained a priest by Cardinal Adolf Bertram and began pastoral work in Silesia until he was expelled from there in 1946. He then earned his habilitation degree in New Testament Exegesis in 1947 with Das Heilsgeschehen bei der Taufe nach dem Apostel Paulus (Salvation through Baptism according to the Apostle Paul). His habilitation advisor was Friedrich Wilhelm Maier, then at the Ludwig-Maximilians-Universität München, which is where Schnackenburg was made Privatdozent in 1948. From 1952 he was Lecturer in New Testament Exegesis at the Philosophisch-Theologischen Hochschule Dillingen. In 1955, Schnackenburg was made full professor at the University of Bamberg. From 1957 until 1982, he was Professor of New Testament at the University of Würzburg. After his retirement, he was chaplain in a retirement home and worked with the Community of Sant'Egidio.

== Work ==
Schnackenburg was a member of the International Theological Commission (ITC), wrote numerous books (including a commentary on the Gospel of John) and worked on the translation of the German Einheitsübersetzung of the Bible.

== Select publications ==
Commentaries

- Das Evangelium nach Markus, 2 vols. (Düsseldorf)
- Das Matthäusevangelium, 2 vols. (Die Neue Echter Bibel; Würzburg)
- Das Johannesevangelium, 4 vols. (Herders theologischer Kommentar zum Neuen Testament 4; Freiburg)
- Der Brief an die Epheser (Evangelisch-Katholischer Kommentar zum Neuen Testament 10; Düsseldorf)

Other Publications

- Die sittliche Botschaft des Neuen Testaments (Herders theologischer Kommentar zum Neuen Testament, Supplementband 2; Freiburg 1986–1988), vol. 1: Von Jesus zur Urkirche, vol. 2: Die urchristlichen Verkündiger
- Der Jesusweg: Meditationen zum lukanischen 'Reisebericht' (Stuttgarter Taschenbücher 4; Stuttgart 1990)
- Gott hat seinen Sohn gesandt: Das Weihnachtsgeheimnis (Freiburg 1990)
- Die Person Jesu Christi im Spiegel der vier Evangelien, new edition (Herders theologischer Kommentar zum Neuen Testament, Supplementband 4; Freiburg 1998)
- Freundschaft mit Jesus (Freiburg 1995)
- Predigt in der Gemeinschaft Sant’Egidio (Würzburg 2003)
- Die Bergpredigt: Utopische Vision oder Handlungsanweisung? (Düsseldorf 1984)

== Festschriften ==
- Joachim Gnilka, ed., Neues Testament und Kirche: [Festschrift] für Rudolf Schnackenburg [zum 60. Geburtstag am 5. Januar 1974 von Freunden und Kollegen gewidmet] (Freiburg 1974)
- Helmut Merklein, ed., Neues Testament und Ethik: [Festgabe] für Rudolf Schnackenburg (Freiburg 1989)
