= Disciple whom Jesus loved =

Phrase found in the Gospel of John

The phrase "the disciple whom Jesus loved" (Koine Greek: ὁ μαθητὴς ὃν ἠγάπα ὁ Ἰησοῦς, romanized: ho mathētēs hon ēgapā ho Iēsous) or, in John 20:2; "the other disciple whom Jesus loved" (τὸν ἄλλον μαθητὴν ὃν ἐφίλει ὁ Ἰησοῦς, ton allon mathētēn hon ephilei ho Iēsous), is used six times in the Gospel of John, but in no other New Testament accounts of Jesus. John 21:24 states that the Gospel of John is based on the written testimony of this disciple.

Since the end of the first century, the beloved disciple has often (but not unanimously) been identified with John the Evangelist. Scholars have debated the authorship of Johannine literature (the Gospel of John, Epistles of John, and the Book of Revelation) since at least the third century, but especially since the Enlightenment. There was a consensus among Johannine scholars that the beloved disciple was a real historical person, but there is no consensus on who the beloved disciple was, and a growing number of scholars view the disciple as a literary creation.

== Sources ==
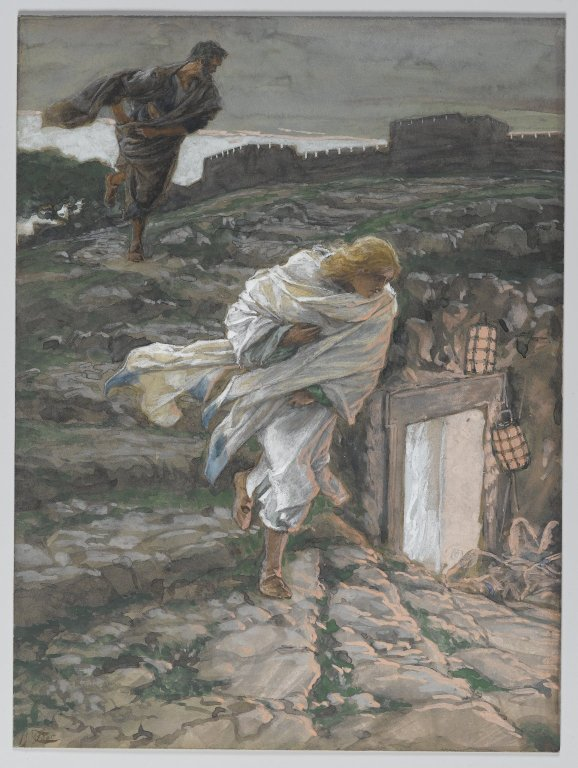
Saint Peter and Saint John Run to the Sepulchre, by James Tissot c. 1886–1894

The disciple whom Jesus loved is referred to six times in the Gospel of John. The New Testament makes two references to an unnamed "other disciple" in John 1:35–40 and John 18:15–16, which may be to the same person based on the wording in John 20:2. The disciple, while reclining beside Jesus at the Last Supper, asks Jesus who it is that will betray him, after being requested by Peter to do so. The disciple as author witnesses the Crucifixion and "testifies". Jesus tells his mother, "Woman, here is your son", and to the beloved disciple he says, "Here is your mother." When Mary Magdalene discovers the empty tomb, she runs to tell the beloved disciple and Peter. The two men rush to the empty tomb and the beloved disciple is the first to reach it. However, Peter is the first to enter. The beloved disciple is one of seven fishermen involved in the miraculous catch of 153 fish. In John 21:20–23, after Jesus implies the manner in which Peter will die, Peter sees the beloved disciple following them and asks, "What about him?" Jesus answers, "If I want him to remain until I come, what is that to you? You follow Me." Finally, the book is said to be authored by the disciple whom Jesus loved in John 21:24.

The other Gospels do not mention anyone in parallel circumstances who could be directly linked to the beloved disciple. For example, in Luke 24:12, Peter runs to the tomb. Matthew, Mark, and Luke do not mention any one of the 12 disciples having witnessed the crucifixion.

== Identity ==
There is a consensus among Johannine scholars that the beloved disciple was a real historical person, but there is no consensus on who the beloved disciple was, and a growing number of scholars view the disciple as a literary creation.

=== John the Apostle ===
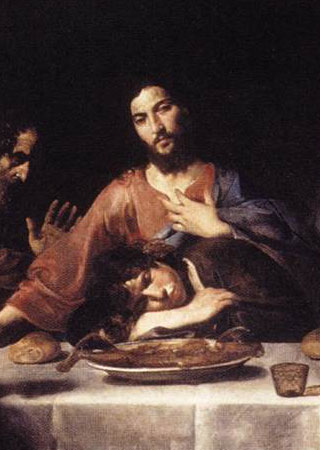
Jesus and John at the Last Supper, by Valentin de Boulogne

Eusebius, writing in the fourth century, recorded in his Church History a letter which he believed to have been written by Polycrates of Ephesus (c. 130s–196) in the second century. Polycrates believed that John was the one "who reclined upon the bosom of the Lord", suggesting an identification with the beloved disciple:

John, who was both a witness and a teacher, "who reclined upon the bosom of the Lord", and, being a priest, wore the sacerdotal plate. He fell asleep at Ephesus.

Augustine of Hippo (354–430 AD) also believed that John was the beloved disciple, in his Tractates on the Gospel of John.

The assumption that the beloved disciple was one of the Apostles is based on the observation that he was apparently present at the Last Supper, and Matthew and Mark state that Jesus ate with the Twelve. Thus, the most frequent identification is with John the Apostle, who would then be the same as John the Evangelist. Merril F. Unger presents a case for this by a process of elimination.

Nevertheless, while many modern academics continue to share the view of Augustine and Polycrates, this position raises questions as to why the writer does not describe the Transfiguration or his calling to discipleship if he truly were John the son of Zebedee, and many others have moved away from the traditional identification in favor of alternatives such as John the Elder or a literary creation.

Tilborg suggests that the portrait in the Gospel of John is "positively attuned to the development of possibly homosexual behaviour". However, he cautions that "in the code [...] such imaginary homosexual behaviour is not an expression of homosexuality." Meanwhile, theologian Ismo Dunderberg has also explored the issue and argues that the absence of accepted Greek terms for "lover" and "beloved" discounts an erotic reading.

As early as the sixteenth century (albeit in a heretical context) – it was documented, for example, in the trial for blasphemy of Christopher Marlowe, who was accused of claiming that "St. John the Evangelist was bedfellow to Christ and leaned always in his bosom, that he used him as the sinners of Sodoma". In accusing Marlowe of the "sinful nature" of homosexual acts, James I of England inevitably invited comparisons to his own erotic relationship with the Duke of Buckingham, which he also compared with that of the beloved disciple. Finally, Francesco Calcagno, a friar of Venice, faced trial and was executed in 1550 for claiming that "St. John was Christ's catamite".

Wayne Dynes also makes a link to the modern day where in 1970s New York a religious group was established called the "Church of the Beloved Disciple", with the intention of giving a reading of the relationship to support same-sex relationships.

=== Mary Magdalene ===
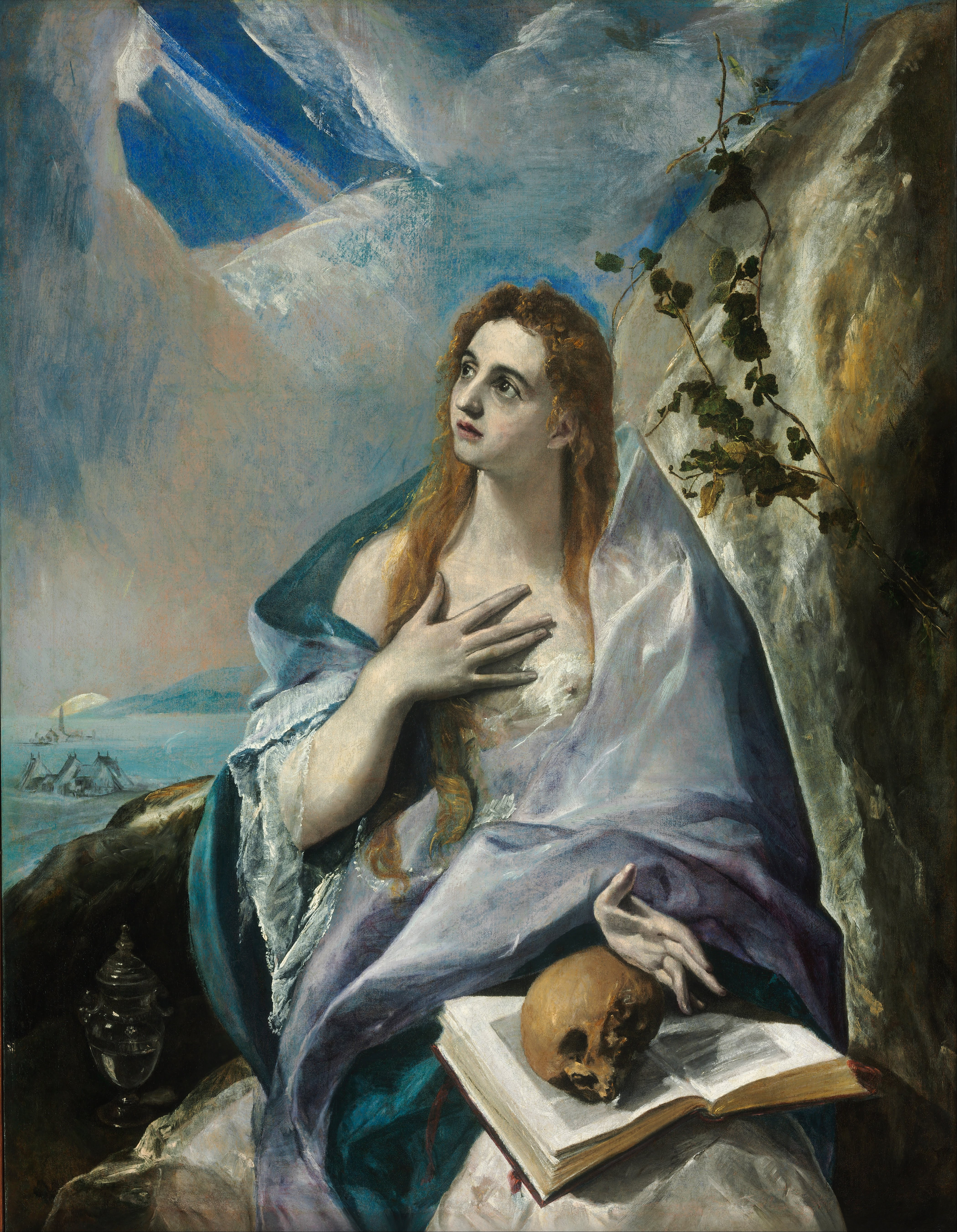
Penitent Magdalene, Mary Magdalene by El Greco, c. 1580

Ramon K. Jusino (1998) proposed that the beloved disciple in the Gospel of John was originally Mary Magdalene. But Matkin and others note that Mary and the beloved disciple appear in the same scene in John 20.

To make this claim and maintain consistency with scripture, the theory is suggested that Mary's separate existence in the two common scenes with the beloved disciple, John 19:25–27 and John 20:1–11, is due to later modifications, hastily done to authorize the Gospel in the late second century. John 19:25–27 in particular only mentions the beloved disciple's presence at the foot of the cross immediately after Mary Magdalene is named among the list of women also present and not prior. Moreover, the beloved disciple is not listed accompanying Jesus's mother at the cross prior to the listed women; only upon being acknowledged and commissioned by Jesus to look after his mother is the beloved disciple's presence established. Both scenes are claimed to have inconsistencies both internally and in reference to the synoptic Gospels. This rough editing therefore might have been done to make Mary Magdalene and the beloved disciple appear as different persons.

In the Gospel of Mary, part of the New Testament apocrypha (specifically the Nag Hammadi library) a certain Mary who is commonly identified as Mary Magdalene is constantly referred to as being loved by Jesus more than the others. In the Gospel of Philip, another Gnostic Nag Hammadi text, the same is specifically said about Mary Magdalene.

=== Lazarus ===
The beloved disciple has also been identified with Lazarus of Bethany, based on John 11:5: "Now Jesus loved Martha and her sister and Lazarus", and John 11:3, "Therefore his sisters sent unto him, saying, Lord, behold, he whom thou lovest is sick."

Also relevant, according to Ben Witherington III, is the fact that the character of the beloved disciple is not mentioned before the raising of Lazarus (Lazarus being raised in John 11, while the beloved disciple is first mentioned in John 13).

Finally, Lazarus is described as "reclining at table" with Jesus the chapter before the "beloved disciple" does the same.

Frederick Baltz asserts that the Lazarus identification, the evidence suggesting that the beloved disciple was a priest, and the ancient John tradition are all correct. Baltz says the family of the children of Boethus, known from Josephus and rabbinic literature, is the same family in John 11: Lazarus, Martha, and Mary of Bethany. This is a beloved family, according to John 11:5. The historical Lazarus was Eleazar son of Boethus, who was once Israel's high priest, and from a clan that produced several high priests. The Gospel's traditionally-ascribed author, John, was not a member of the Twelve, but the son of Martha (Sukkah 52b). He closely matches the description given by Polycrates of Ephesus in his letter, a sacrificing priest who wore the petalon (i.e., emblem of the high priest). This John "the Elder" was a follower of Jesus referred to by Papias of Hierapolis, and an eyewitness to his ministry. He was the right age to have lived until the time of Trajan (according to Irenaeus). Baltz says John is probably the disciple "ον ηγαπα ο Ιησους", and Eleazar is the disciple "ον εφιλει ο Ιησους" in the Gospel.

=== Unknown priest or disciple ===
Brian J. Capper argues that the beloved disciple was a priestly member of a quasimonastic, mystical, and ascetic Jewish aristocracy, located on Jerusalem's prestigious southwest hill, who had hosted Jesus's last supper in that location, citing the scholar D.E.H. Whiteley, who deduced that the Beloved Disciple was the host at the last supper. Capper suggests, to explain the largely distinctive designation of the beloved disciple as one loved by Jesus, that the language of 'love' was particularly related to Jewish groups which revealed the distinctive social characteristics of 'virtuoso religion' in ascetic communities. The British scholar Richard Bauckham reaches the similar conclusion that the beloved disciple, who also authored the Gospel attributed to John, was probably a literarily sophisticated member of the surprisingly extensive high priestly family clan.

Gerd Theissen and Annette Merz suggest the testimony may have come from a lesser known disciple, perhaps from Jerusalem.

=== James, brother of Jesus ===
James Tabor argues that the beloved disciple is James, brother of Jesus. One of several pieces of evidence Tabor offers is a literal interpretation of John 19:26: "Then when Jesus saw His mother and the disciple whom He loved standing by, He said to His mother, Woman, behold your son."

Tabor also cites a passage of Jesus referring to James as "my beloved" (twice) in the second century apocryphal Second Apocalypse of James as indicating James to be the beloved disciple. This passage reads:

And Jesus kissed my mouth. He took hold of me saying: 'My beloved! Behold, I shall reveal to you those things that the heavens nor the angels have known. Behold, I shall reveal to you everything, my beloved. Behold, I shall reveal to you what is hidden. But now, stretch out your hand. Now, take hold of me'.

== Reasons for concealing the identity by name ==
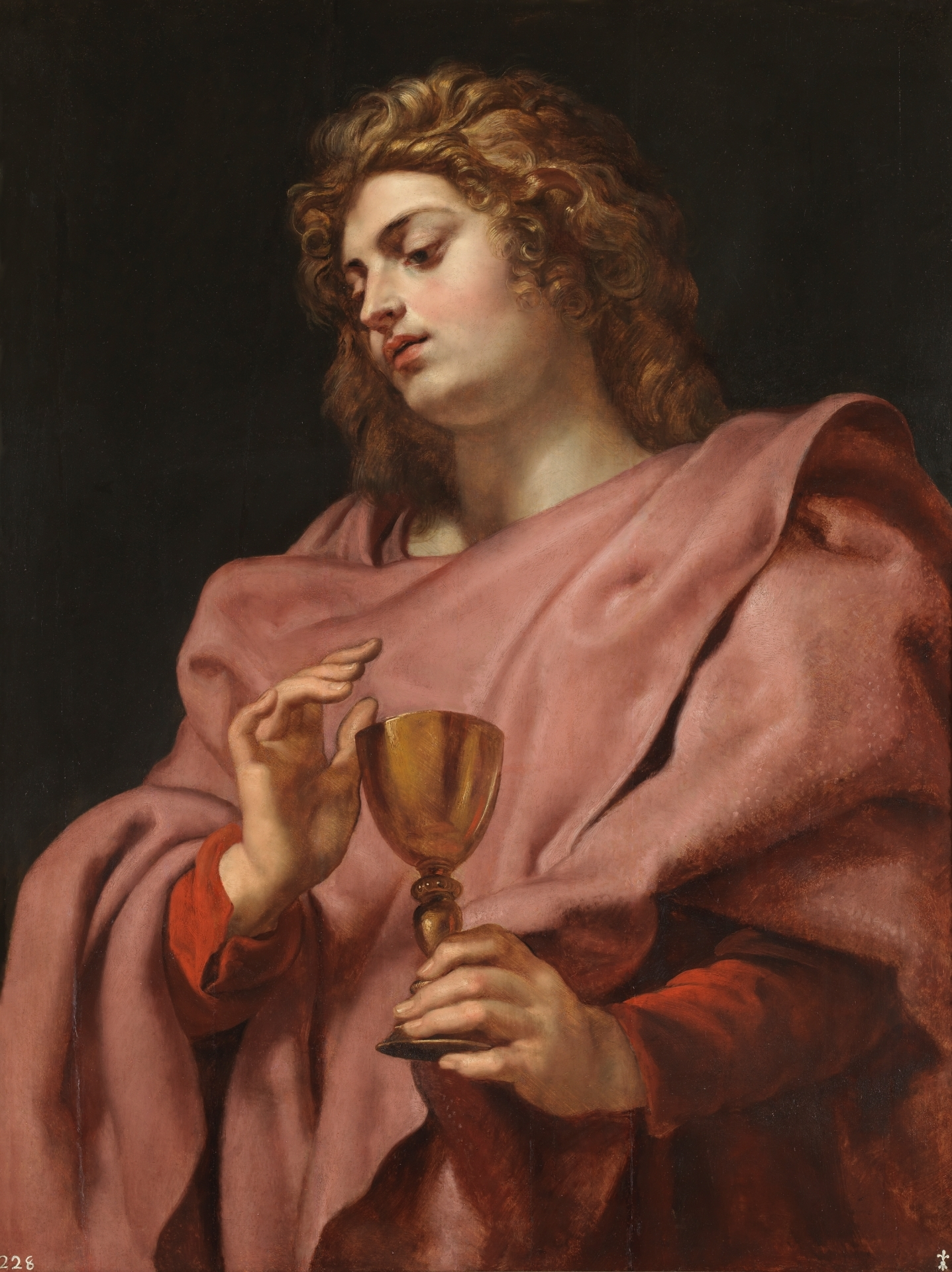
St John at Patmos by Pieter Paul Rubens, c. 1611

Theories about the reference often include an attempt to explain why this anonymizing idiom is used at all, rather than stating an identity.

Suggestions accounting for this are numerous. One common proposal is that the author concealed his name due simply to modesty. Another is that concealment served political or security reasons, made necessary by the threat of persecution or embarrassment during the time of the Gospel's publication. The author may have been a highly placed person in Jerusalem who was hiding his affiliation with Christianity, or the anonymity may have been appropriate for one living the withdrawn life of an ascetic, and one of the many unnamed disciples in the Gospel may have been either the beloved disciple himself or others under his guidance, who out of the humility of their ascetic commitment hid their identity or subsumed their witness under that of their spiritual master.

Martin L. Smith, a member of the Society of St John the Evangelist, writes that the author of the Gospel of John may have deliberately obscured the identity of the beloved disciple so readers of the gospel may better identify with the disciple's relationship with Jesus:

Perhaps the disciple is never named, never individualized, so that we can more easily accept that he bears witness to an intimacy that is meant for each one of us. The closeness that he enjoyed is a sign of the closeness that is mine and yours because we are in Christ and Christ is in us.

== Art ==
In art, the beloved disciple is often portrayed as a beardless youth, usually as one of the Twelve Apostles at the Last Supper or with Mary at the crucifixion. In some medieval art, the beloved disciple is portrayed with his head in Christ's lap. Many artists have given different interpretations of John 13:25, which has the disciple whom Jesus loved "reclining next to Jesus" (v. 23; more literally, "on/at his breast/bosom," en to kolpo).
