= John 20:16 =

- ← 20:15 20:17 →
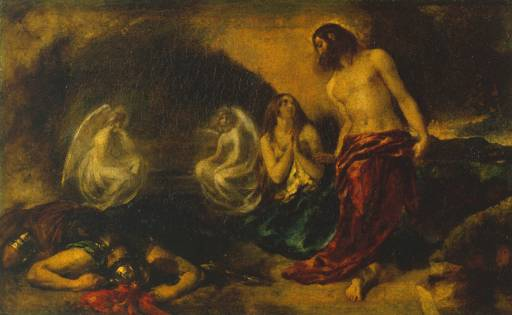
- William Etty's Christ Appearing to Mary Magdalene after the Resurrection, first exhibited in 1834
- Book: Gospel of John
- Christian Bible part: New Testament

John 20:16 is the sixteenth verse in the twentieth chapter of the Gospel of John in the New Testament of the Bible. The verse describes the moment when Mary Magdalene recognizes Jesus' voice calling her name.

== Content ==
In the King James Version of the Bible, the text reads:

Jesus saith unto her, Mary. She turned herself, and saith unto him, Rabboni; which is to say, Master.

In the English Standard Version this verse reads:

Jesus said to her, "Mary." She turned and said to him in Aramaic, "Rabboni!" (which means Teacher).

In the Vulgate, the text reads:

dicit ei Jesus Maria conversa illa dicit, ei: Rabboni (quod dicitur Magister).

For a collection of other versions see BibleHub John 20:16.

== Translation notes ==
This verse, in the original Greek text, presents Jesus as addressing Mary Magdalene by the name "Μαριάμ" (Μariam), not the Hellenized form “Μαρία” (Maria), with Mary responding by calling Jesus “Ῥαββουνι” (Rabbouni), in both instances using Aramaic terms.

The Greek word διδάσκαλος (didaskalos) in the original text and its Latin translation magister mean "teacher". Older English translations use "master", derived from the Latin word and meaning the same thing.

== Analysis ==
Mary has found Jesus' tomb empty and is worrying about what happened to his body. At first she does not recognize Jesus when he appears, thinking he is a gardener. In this verse she recognizes him when he calls her by name.

The exact significance of Rabboni is disputed. In Mark 10:51 it is translated as meaning "beloved teacher", but John here and in other verses translates it as διδασκαλε (didaskale), meaning "teacher". W. F. Albright and others interpret Rabboni as the diminutive form of Rabbi, and therefore translate it as "my dear Rabbi", showing the close friendship between Mary and Jesus. Mary was thus calling Jesus with a title she had long used, signifying that she sees his return as a reversion to the status quo before his crucifixion. In verses 17 and 18, Jesus divests her of this view, informing her that everything is changed.

However, in some works from this period, Rabboni is used as a name for God: for example, Honi HaMe'agel refers to God as "ribbono shel 'olam" in Ta'anit 3.8. Thus some scholars, such as Edwin Hoskyns, see the term as demonstrating that Mary has understood Jesus' divinity. Most scholars consider the title a respectful one, but less adoring than the term adonai. In contrast, when Thomas later accepts the truth of the resurrection, he calls Jesus "My lord and my God" (see John 20:28).

Mary's reaction seems to be spontaneous, and it is not known if "Rabboni" is an exclamation of discovery, or whether it should read "Rabboni?" with Mary momentarily questioning Jesus.

John 20:14 has already mentioned that Mary had turned around to see Jesus, so why does this verse say she turns again? One school of thought is that unmentioned by the author Mary had turned away from Jesus in the meantime. Kastner argues that she did so because the resurrected Jesus was nude. According to Raymond E. Brown, most scholars simply believe that she had not fully turned in verse 14 and was now fully turning towards Jesus.

Mary earlier did not recognize Jesus. When he addresses her by name she quickly realizes who it is. Some scholars link this to John 10:3, which states that "the good shepherd calleth to him by name every sheep of his flock", arguing that Jesus using Mary's name had deep powers. Some see Mary's transition from ignorance to worship as a metaphor for the adoption of faith.

== Other gospels ==
The three other gospels do not recount this exchange, and give somewhat different accounts of the event. Matthew 28:9, for example, records:

And as they went to tell his disciples, behold, Jesus met them, saying, All hail. And they came and held him by the feet, and worshipped him.

This passage describes the women having already been informed of the resurrection by the angels in the tomb and leaving to tell the disciples of the event. It also clearly describes more than one woman being present, and omits the period where Mary is uncertain of Jesus' identity. Mark and Luke agree with Matthew on these incongruities. Some scholars, such as Norman Geisler, explain this by arguing that, unmentioned by John, Mary ran into another group of women after leaving the tomb. This larger group returns goes to the tomb together whence the events described by the synoptic gospels unfold.

== Mystery play ==
The York Cycle of English mystery plays has a whole (ten-minute) play about this incident. The word discussed above is Rabony in the original manuscript, and Rabbi in one modernized version.

== Bibliography ==
- Brown, Raymond E. "The Gospel According to John: XIII-XXI" The Anchor Bible Series Volume 29A New York: Doubleday & Company, 1970.
- John Calvin's commentary on John 20:16-18
- Jesus Appears to His Disciples
- The Resurrection Account: Does it Make Sense?

Preceded by John 20:15	Gospel of John; Chapter 20	Succeeded by John 20:17
