= Matthew 28:1 =

- ← 27:66 28:2 →
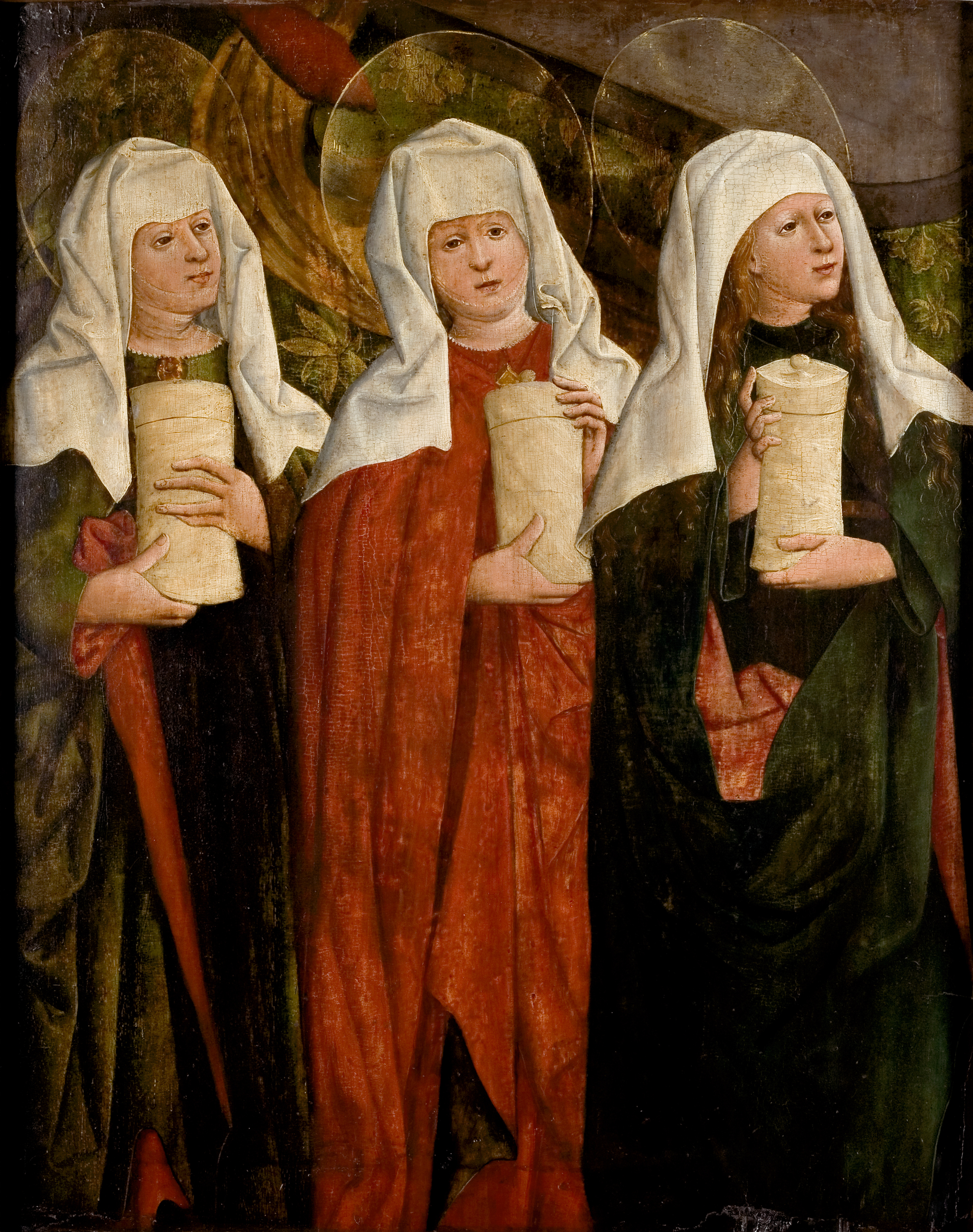
- Mikołaj Haberschrack's Three Marys at the Tomb depicts three women, following Mark's version
- Book: Gospel of Matthew
- Christian Bible part: New Testament

Matthew 28:1 is the first verse of the twenty-eighth chapter of the Gospel of Matthew in the New Testament. This verse opens the resurrection narrative as Mary Magdalene and "the other Mary" visit Jesus' tomb after the crucifixion.

== Content ==
The original Koine Greek, according to Westcott and Hort, reads:

οψε δε σαββατων τη επιφωσκουση εις μιαν σαββατων ηλθεν
μαρια η μαγδαληνη και η αλλη μαρια θεωρησαι τον ταφον

In the King James Version of the Bible it is translated as:

In the end of the sabbath, as it began to dawn toward the first day of the week,
came Mary Magdalene and the other Mary to see the sepulchre.

The modern World English Bible translates the passage as:

Now after the Sabbath, as it began to dawn on the first day of the
week, Mary Magdalene and the other Mary came to see the tomb. (Note: For a collection of other versions see BibleHub Matthew 28:1.)

== Analysis ==
The most important debate over this verse is what it says about the time of the visit, and thus the resurrection. The three other gospels, and Christian tradition, have the empty tomb discovered the day after Sabbath, today known as Easter Sunday. This verse has two time indicators. The first can be translated as "late on Sabbath" and the second as "at the beginning of the first day of the week". It literally translates as dawning of the day, but as at Luke 23:54 this term can also refer to the beginning of night. By the Jewish calendar the new day begins at sundown, thus the beginning of the day would have been Saturday evening. Thus the verse can be read as describing the resurrection as happening on Saturday rather than Sunday. Some scholars, such as Eduard Schweizer. and Robert H. Gundry believe that the author of Matthew did have a different chronology in mind when he wrote this verse.

This has been an issue of concern for Christian writers since early in church history. St. Augustine was concerned that an initial reading of the verse indicated the Saturday date, but argued it could also be read as referring to Sunday morning and thus in keeping with the other gospels. Some modern scholars agree. France notes that there is no good explanation for any time difference, and Matthew was clearly working from a copy of Mark with its Sunday timing. Nolland believes that the Greek is ambiguous, but can be read to refer to Sunday morning. "Late on Sabbath" can be read as "after Sabbath" and the "beginning of the next day" as the "dawning of the next day", and thus sunrise on Sunday. Nolland also notes that other Jewish texts from the period are also imprecise and refer to the dawn as the beginning of a new day. Davies and Allison also consider the Saturday evening timing as less likely, as an evening visit would have been implausible, as two women would not have travelled to the edge of town as darkness was falling in that era.

In this verse the author of Matthew seems to be working from a copy of Mark 16:1-3. Luke 24:1-12 and John 20:1-13 also cover the same events, and seem to share some of the same source material beyond what is in Mark. There are many changes from Mark. Matthew mentions only two women, dropping Salome from the group. It also refers to "the other Mary." An ambiguous usage copied from Matthew 27:61 and usually accepted to refer to Mary, the mother of James.

In Mark and Luke the women come to the tomb to anoint the body of Jesus. This is dropped from Matthew's version. Here they are described as coming simply to "see the tomb." This is usually understood as the women coming to continue their vigil that had begun at Matthew 27:55. The anointing is also not an issue, as this was already accomplished at Matthew 26:12. Anointing would also have been impossible in Matthew's story, due to the guards posted outside the tomb in his version. Schweizer notes that anointing at this stage was improbable to begin with, as a body after three days in the Near Eastern heat would be unpleasant to work with.

Matthew thus drops the description of the women buying the anointing spices, something Mark has happening on the Saturday evening. The author of Matthew may have copied the wording from the Saturday spice buying over to the visit to the tomb, creating the ambiguity in the timing. Unlike Luke, Matthew gives no information as to what happened on Sabbath itself, skipping over that day.

Nolland notes that the reference to the dawn might be a link to Matthew 4:16, creating a link between the very beginning of Jesus' ministry and its end. Peter Chrysologus wrote that the reference to dawn is to the renewal of Sabbath on its new day.

== Notes ==
Preceded by Matthew 27:66	Gospel of Matthew; Chapter 28	Succeeded by Matthew 28:2
