= Matthew 28:3 =

- ← 28:2 28:4 →
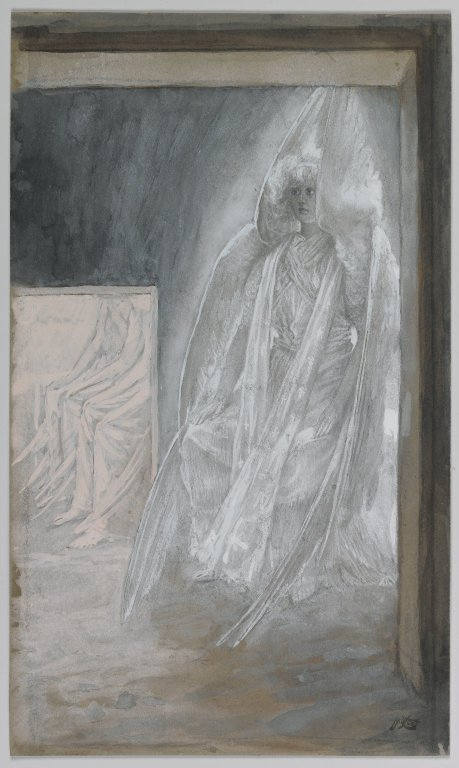
- James Tissot's The Angel Seated on the Stone of the Tomb. It also shows two other angels sitting within the tomb, a common way of reconciling Matthew's account with the other gospels.
- Book: Gospel of Matthew
- Christian Bible part: New Testament

Matthew 28:3 is the third verse of the twenty-eighth chapter of the Gospel of Matthew in the New Testament. This verse is part of the resurrection narrative and describes the angel who arrived at the tomb of Jesus in the previous verse.

== Content ==
The original Koine Greek, according to Westcott and Hort, reads:

ην δε η ειδεα αυτου ως αστραπη
και το ενδυμα αυτου λευκον ως χιων

In the King James Version of the Bible it is translated as:

His countenance was like lightning,
and his raiment white as snow:

The modern World English Bible translates the passage as:

His appearance was bright as lightning,
and his clothing is white as snow. (Note: For a collection of other versions see BibleHub Matthew 28:3.)

== Analysis ==
As with the great events of the previous verse, this verse emphasizes the importance of the figure and the events that happened. The text depicts the angel as an exalted figure and thus prompting great importance. The other gospels have a more muted description of the angel: Mark 16:5 and John 20:12 refer to a figure clad in white, while Luke 24:4 in the Revised Standard Version and some other translations describes the clothes as "dazzling", perhaps combining the lightning face and white clothes of this verse.

The image of the angel has multiple descriptions in the Old Testament, reflecting Matthew's fondness for scriptural references. Daniel 10:6 mentioned an angel with a face like lightning, and Ezekiel 1 since lightning associates with the creatures surrounding God. Daniel 7:9 described God himself as appearing white as snow. This suggest that angels are linked to God and that they are more than mere messengers, but they also play an important theophonic role.

The description is also similar to that of the transfigured Christ at Matthew 17:2, but Boring suggests that the angel in that verse was a bit less in glory from Jesus, showing his more divine nature. Jesus is also described as being white as snow in Revelation 1:14. The color white symbolizes purity in both the Old and New Testaments, a reflection of the culture in that period. Jewish rabbis, Egyptian priests, and pious worshippers were all normally clad in white in this period.

== Textual witnesses ==
Some early manuscripts containing the text of this verse are:

- Codex Vaticanus (~325-350)
- Codex Sinaiticus (~330-360)
- Codex Bezae (~400)
- Codex Washingtonianus (~400)
- Codex Alexandrinus (~400-440)
- Codex Ephraemi Rescriptus (~450)
- Papyrus 105 (5th/6th century)
- Codex Purpureus Rossanensis (6th century)

== Notes ==
Preceded by Matthew 28:2	Gospel of Matthew; Chapter 7	Succeeded by Matthew 28:4
