= John 20:15 =

- ← 20:14 20:16 →
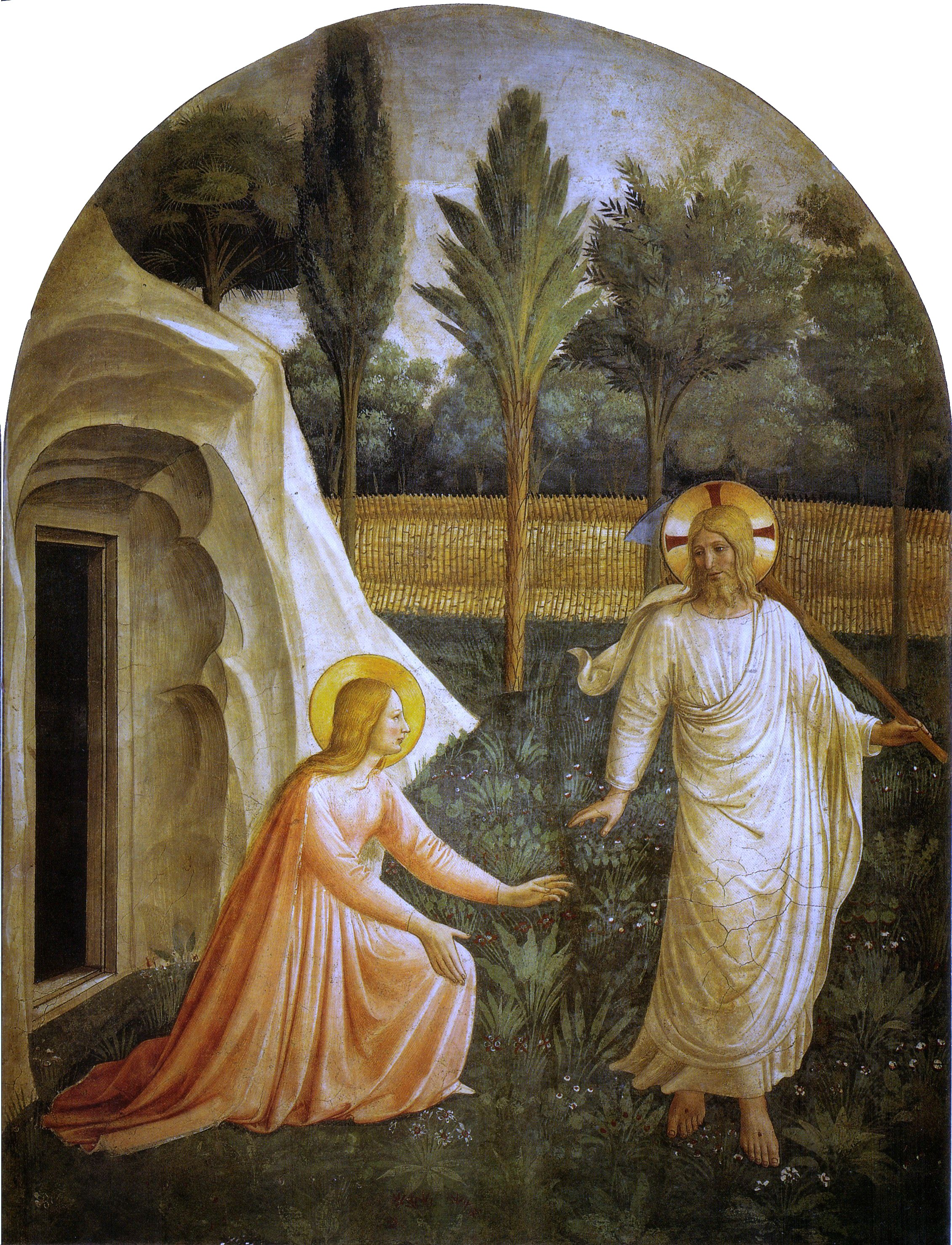
- Jesus Appearing to the Magdalene by Fra Angelico. Jesus is shown holding an axe, symbolizing Mary's thinking of him as a gardener.
- Book: Gospel of John
- Christian Bible part: New Testament

John 20:15 is the fifteenth verse of the twentieth chapter of the Gospel of John in the New Testament of the Christian Bible. Mary Magdalene has returned to Jesus' tomb and found it empty. She does not know that Jesus has risen from death, and they begin conversing without her realizing his identity.

== Content ==
In the King James Version of the Bible the text reads:

Jesus saith unto her, Woman, why weepest thou? whom seekest thou? She, supposing him to be the gardener, saith unto him,

Sir, if thou have borne him hence, tell me where thou hast laid him, and I will take him away.

The English Standard Version translates this verse as:

Jesus said to her, "Woman, why are you weeping? Whom are you seeking?" Supposing him to be the gardener, she said to him, "Sir, if you have carried him away, tell me where you have laid him, and I will take him away."

For a collection of other versions see BibleHub John 20:15.

== Analysis ==
According to John, "Woman, why are you crying? Who is it you are looking for?" is the first thing Jesus says upon his resurrection. The first part "Why are you crying?" repeats the statement made by the angels in verse 13. Jesus adds "Who is it you are looking for?" This question, which Jesus has asked others previously in the Gospel, is often read as a wider question of what people are seeking in their lives. That Jesus quickly understands why Mary is weeping is also said to show his greater understanding of humanity and human feelings than the angels.

Mary fails, for an unexplained reason, to recognize Jesus, but it is speculated that her sorrow is too overwhelming. Reformation theologian John Calvin and others read this as a metaphor: so focused is she on the worldly concern of who took Jesus' body, she is temporarily blind to the greater event behind its "disappearance". It is also possible she could not see clearly because she was weeping. She mistakes him for the gardener, generally believed to be one of the workers of Joseph of Arimathea. The error is "naturally" made, according to Protestant commentator Heinrich Meyer, because "this unknown individual was in the garden, and already so early", recalling that Mary's arrival in the garden was "early, while it was still dark".

According to Calvin, how Mary addressed the gardener in the original texts, κυριε (kurie), translated as "sir", was the typical form of address for lower class labourers in the period, or according to Henry Alford, "the appellation of courtesy to an unknown person". For Meyer, the form of address "aris[es] from her deeply prostrate, helpless grief".

This is the only place in the Bible where the word gardener, κηπουρός (képouros), is mentioned, although the word does occur regularly in secular works from this period. It is perhaps linked with John 19:41, which mentions that Jesus was buried in a garden. John is the only one of the canonical gospels to mention this.

The mention of the gardener is also perhaps linked to a Jewish story from the period which attempted to discredit the resurrection. One version of this story supposes that a gardener named Judas was worried that the crowds coming to see Jesus would trample his cabbages and he thus moved Jesus' body to another tomb. When Mary and others found the tomb empty, the resurrection myth was born. Von Campenhausen thus argues that the author of John added the mention of the gardener to try and counter this story. Rudolf Schnackenburg suggests that it is also possible that the Jewish story originated from this mention of a gardener.

Edwyn Hoskyns and Joseph Barber Lightfoot both support the idea that Jesus as a gardener is a metaphor relating to the Garden of Eden.

That Mary easily mistakes Jesus for a common labourer adds detail to why she has failed to recognize him. It seems to contradict the notion that Jesus' body was horribly mangled by the crucifixion. It also seems at odds with Kastner's view that Jesus was nude at the time of his resurrection, as gardeners at the time would normally have been clothed.

Mary does not tell the supposed gardener of whom she is speaking, also seen as evidence of her single-mindedness. Jesus seems to encourage this confusion by addressing her as woman and asking questions to which he already knows the answer. Why he does this is still something of a mystery, though some ideas have been proposed. The suspense of Mary interacting with Jesus while not knowing his true identity does add considerable extra drama to the scene. The trope of a returning hero being unrecognized or in disguise dates at least to Homer's The Odyssey and was common in Greco-Roman literature for many centuries. Martin Dibelius links it to the many stories of the Greco-Roman gods walking among men and then suddenly revealing their divine nature. André Feuillet sees echoes of the Song of Solomon in this passage.

The question she asks him implies that she hopes to recover Jesus' body and rebury it. F. F. Bruce suggests that this willingness to rebury Jesus shows that Mary must have been a woman of some wealth as such a reburial would have been a costly affair. Bruce also believes this initiative shows Mary's enterprising character. According to William Leonard, St. Theresa read the same text as an illustration of Mary's audaciousness.

| Preceded by John 20:14 | Gospel of John; Chapter 20 | Succeeded by John 20:16 |
