= Fear and trembling (biblical phrase) =

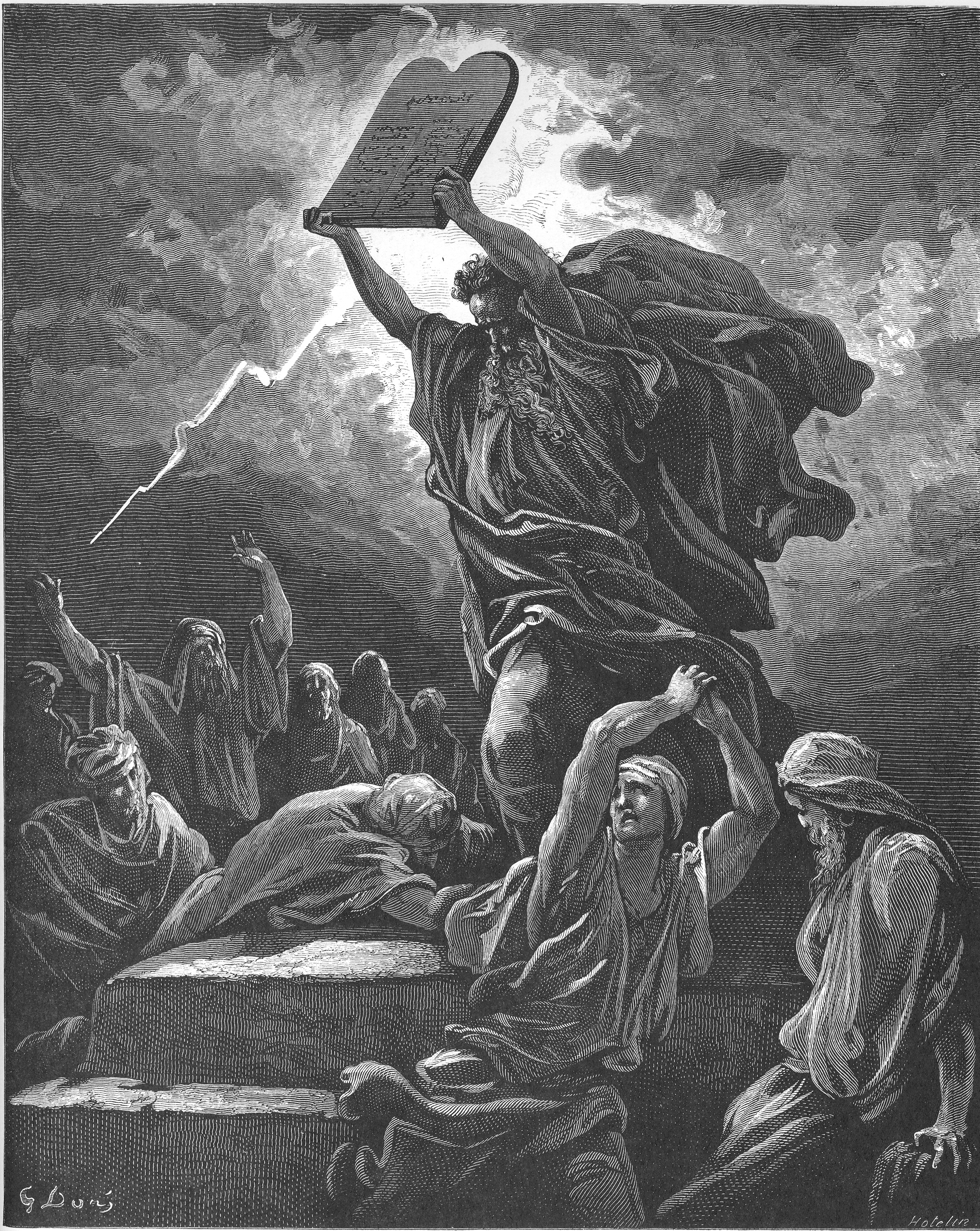
Moses breaks the tablets containing the Ten Commandments, on seeing the Israelites worshipping the Golden calf. (Note: The episode is narrated at Exodus 32:19.) William Fiddian Moulton considered "I fear and tremble" the best translation of Moses's words on this occasion, as narrated by Paul the Apostle at Hebrews 12:21. (Note: Moulton 1905, p. 342. The words do not appear in the Exodus narrative.)

"Fear and trembling" (Ancient Greek: φόβος καὶ τρόμος, romanised: phobos kai tromos, a rendering of the Hebrew: חָרֵד, romanised: ḥārēḏ, lit. 'tremble' or 'be afraid') (Note: Savage 2009, p. 72. On the Hebrew equivalent, see "ḥārēḏ". Blue-Letter Bible.) is a phrase used throughout the Bible and the Tanakh, and in other Jewish literature. In Jewish writing, it commonly refers to the reaction of those facing superior military force, or of sinners fearing the imminent vengeance of God; in the New Testament, it is frequently used, especially by Paul the Apostle, to denote the reverence human beings should feel before God, or before a formidable task in his service. It was later adopted by John Calvin as part of his doctrine of salvation, and by John Henry Newman to indicate the appropriate reverence of Christian worshippers towards Christ and the sacraments.

In the antebellum United States, Paul's use of "fear and trembling" to describe the proper attitude of slaves towards their masters was debated. The phrase was quoted in 1822 by the sentencing judge in the trial of Denmark Vesey to justify the biblical basis of American slavery, while abolitionist theologians variously denied that it referred to enslaved people and argued that its inconsistency with other Christian doctrines indicated Paul's true opposition to slavery. The motif of fear and trembling was used by Edmund Spenser in his poem The Faerie Queene, and as the title of Søren Kierkegaard's 1843 treatise Fear and Trembling, both of which have been interpreted as referring to its use in the New Testament.

== Scriptural use ==
Markus Bockmuehl describes "fear and trembling" as "a common biblical phrase describing the response of due reverence in the face of a major challenge, and especially in the presence of God and his mighty acts".

=== Judaism ===
References to fear and trembling are common throughout the Hebrew Bible: it is used as a stock phrase when a weaker military force encounters a stronger one, sometimes explicitly brought about by God. In Exodus 15:16, during the Song of Moses, it is proclaimed that the people of Canaan will be struck by "fear and trembling" at the hands of God. In Isaiah 19:16, it is similarly prophesied that the Egyptians will be "as women in fear and trembling" at the appearance of the hand of God.

In the Book of Enoch, an apocalyptic text dating to between the third and first centuries BCE, the motif of fear and trembling is used frequently. Demons are seized by "fear and trembling" when Enoch pronounces divine sentence upon them; (Note: 1 Enoch 13:3, cited in Riddle 1924, p. 179) it is also prophesied that the rebellious Watchers will be seized by "fear and trembling" at the arrival of God, (Note: Michael Segal considers this a reference to Exodus 15.) while Enoch tells his sons to walk before God "with fear and trembling". The term is also used in Joseph and Aseneth, a narrative dated to around the first century CE, where Asenath feels "much fear and trembling", as well as joy and distress, upon receiving Joseph's blessing. In the Dead Sea Scrolls, the term is used to describe the Israelites' reaction to God's appearance at Mount Sinai. Elsewhere in the Dead Sea Scrolls, in a poem ascribed to the Teacher of Righteousness, the speaker describes feeling "fear and trembling" at the thought of their own sins and those of their ancestors. In 4 Maccabees, written in Greek in the first or second century CE, "fear and trembling" are experienced by those who see an army of angels armed with flaming weapons. Along with related expressions, it is a common feature of epiphanic narratives in earlier apocalyptic literature. The Apocalypse of Sedrach, written between the first and the fifth centuries CE, calls on readers to note that sinners fail to fall before God "with fear and trembling".

=== New Testament ===
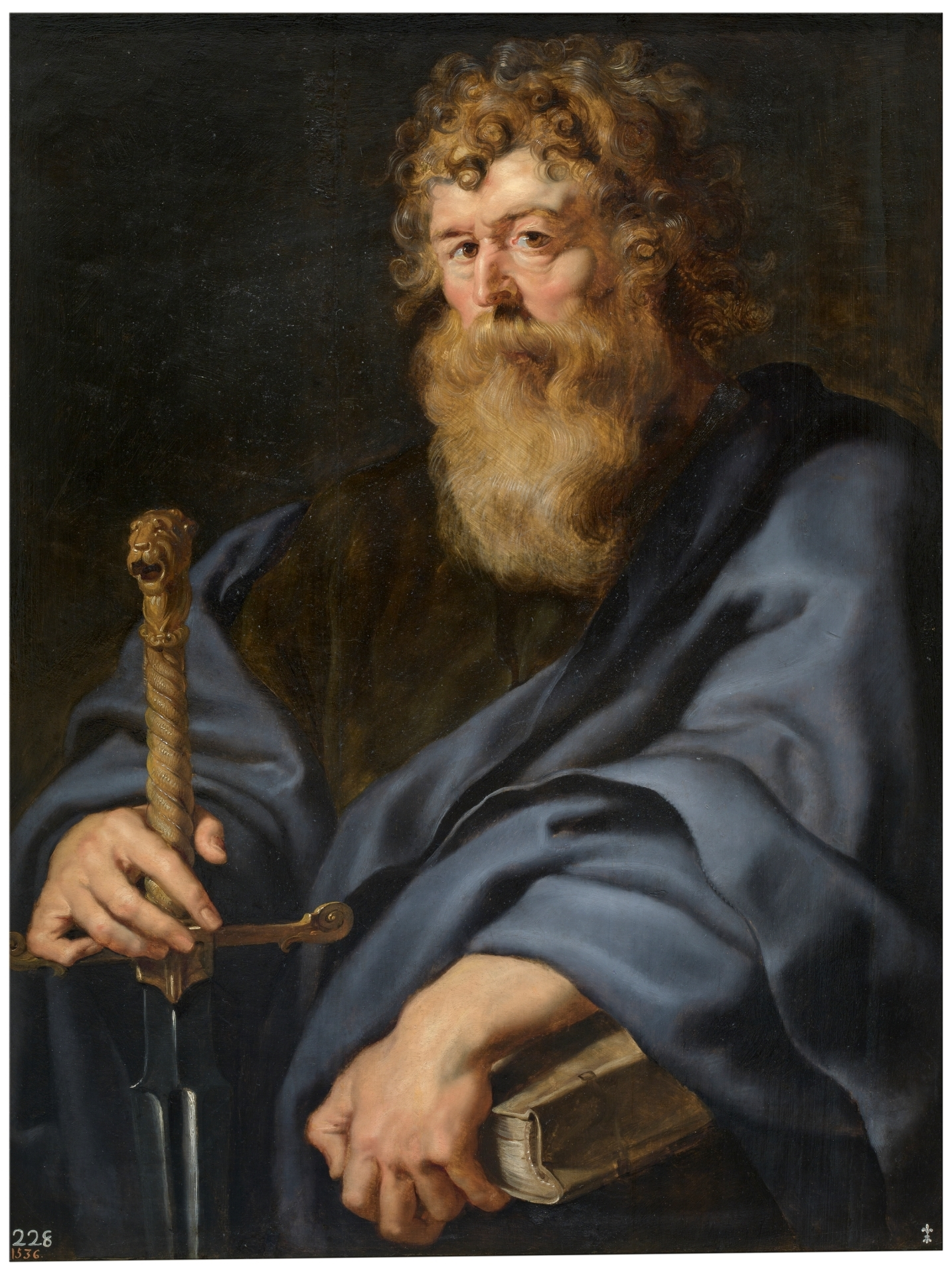
The phrase "fear and trembling" is frequently used in New Testament works by or attributed to Paul the Apostle (painted here by Peter Paul Rubens).

The theologian Klaus Berger has argued that the epiphanic connotations of "fear and trembling" continue in its use in the New Testament, but that it becomes imbued there with greater ethical force, becoming also a model for human relations with each other. The phrase is used in Mark 5:33, describing the bleeding woman questioned by Jesus after being healed by touching his clothes, and Mark uses a variant on it, "trembling and ecstasy" (τρόμος καὶ ἔκστασις; tromos kai ekstasis), to describe the reaction of the Three Marys to learning of the resurrection of Jesus. The phrase is also alluded to in Matthew 28:4, when the tomb guards shake in fear at the sight of the resurrected Jesus.

The phrase is frequently used in texts attributed to the apostle Paul. He praises the Christians of Corinth in 2 Corinthians 7:15 for receiving his emissary Titus "with fear and trembling". In Philippians 2:12–13, Paul urges the Christians of Philippi to work for their salvation "with fear and trembling", given that the Day of Judgement is close at hand. Wilhelm Lütgert, in 1909, suggested that Paul presents the Phillippians as insufficiently fearful of the coming apocalypse, and Robert Jewett presents his use of the "fear and trembling" motif as part of a strategy aimed at destabilising the Philippians' certainty of their future salvation, and perhaps at persuading them away from viewing history as fundamentally static or cyclical, as was typical in Hellenistic philosophy.

In 1 Corinthians 2:3, Paul writes that he came to the Corinthians "in weakness, with great fear and trembling", rather than with the confidence that would befit a skilled orator. Paul's use of "fear and trembling" has been interpreted as a statement of his own nervousness, perhaps in relation to the size of the crowd he was to address, his own feelings of inadequacy, and his isolated position in Corinth, or as a sign of his fear of persecution. Timothy B. Savage, noting that Paul's choice of vocabulary is identical to that used in the Septuagint, suggests that Paul uses it to emphasise his own humility before God, and as part of a rejection of polished, artificial rhetoric. G. Campbell Morgan sees the phrase as contrasting Paul's lack of confidence in his own abilities with his trust that the Holy Spirit would bring about his success, while Clair Mesick similarly presents it as a show of God's power to use human weakness for his purposes. Mesick further suggests that Paul's demeanour allows the drawing of a clear distinction between the "saved" and those destined to "perish", in that the "saved" would accept Paul's authority and the truth of his message despite his unimpressive appearance. She therefore sees the idiom as part of a rhetorical strategy by which Paul urges the Corinthians to unite and assimilate their views and practices to his own, while aiming to discredit alternative preachers with more polished rhetoric as among the "perishing".

== Reception ==
=== In Christianity ===
The sixteenth-century Protestant reformer John Calvin interpreted Paul's exhortation of the Philippians towards "fear and trembling" as encouragement to be submissive and humble, and to avoid the sin of pride. He argued that "Papist" readers considered that fear and trembling represented a challenge to one's faith, where he stated that they were in fact signs of being elect for salvation, as one's distrust of one's own powers would lead towards greater trust in divine mercy. (Note: Calvin 1996, pp. 253–256, as cited in Cefalu 2004, p. 74.) John Henry Newman, a leading figure in the nineteenth-century Oxford Movement which sought to reinstate certain Catholic practices in the Church of England, used the phrase and the concept of fear and trembling in several sermons, urging Christians to feel greater awe and gratitude before Christ's redemption of human sins, and to encourage a feeling of awe towards the Christian sacraments.

==== Role in American slavery ====
In the antebellum United States, Paul's use of "fear and trembling" to describe the proper attitude of slaves towards their masters was debated. The phrase was quoted in 1822 by the sentencing judge in the trial of Denmark Vesey to justify the biblical basis of slavery in the United States, while abolitionist theologians variously denied that it referred to enslaved people and argued that its inconsistency with other Christian doctrines indicated Paul's true opposition to slavery.

In Ephesians 6:5, the author (traditionally identified as Paul the Apostle, though this identification is frequently questioned) encourages slaves (δοῦλοι; douloi) to obey their masters "with fear and trembling", using the phrase to connect their obedience to their masters with their obedience to God. (Note: Williamson 2009, pp. 184–185. On the authorship of Ephesians, see Ladd 1993, pp. 414–415, and Elmer 2015, p. 42.) In his sentencing of ten enslaved men, executed in 1822 on the charge of conspiring with Denmark Vesey, a free black man, to stage a slave revolt in Charleston, South Carolina, the Charleston city recorder Lionel H. Kennedy quoted the verse, adding: "Had you listened with sincerity to such doctrines, you would not have been arrested by an ignominious death". The historian Jeremy Schipper has characterised Kennedy's quotation of Ephesians, alongside other biblical passages, as "a reassertion that proslavery laws of the state [were] aligned with the laws of God".

The passage was frequently debated among abolitionist theologians, as its endorsement of the institution of slavery seemed to imply that abolitionism ran contrary to biblical teaching. An argument popular among clergy, known as the "hermeneutics of plain sense", relied upon the translation of douloi as 'servants' in the King James Bible to assert that Paul's text referred to free servants rather than slaves, an argument dismissed by the prominent biblical scholar Moses Stuart as absurd. A later line of argument popular in the 1840s and 1850s rejected biblical literalism, arguing that a literal reading of Paul's instruction would contradict other parts of the New Testament: in particular, that holding slaves to harsh rules would contradict the Golden Rule as expressed by Jesus, (Note: That is, the principle that people should treat others as they would wish to be treated.) while living obediently as a slave would mean breaking Paul's other directions for Christians to marry, have children, and worship God. They therefore argued that a literal reading of Ephesians 6:5 must be defective. Instead, Evangelical abolitionists, including George B. Cheever, Theodore Dwight Weld and William Hosmer, argued that Paul's stated rules of behaviour for Christian slaves were contradictory, which demonstrated his true, secret opposition to the institution of slavery.

=== In art and literature ===
The sixteenth-century poet Edmund Spenser used the motif of fear and trembling in The Faerie Queene, describing the consternation of the wild beasts as the Palmer uses his staff upon them. The critic Paul Cefalu explains this as a reference to Philippians 2:12–13, via Calvin's exegesis that "fear and trembling" was evidence of being elect for salvation. Cefalu presents Spenser's use of the phrase as drawing together the Old Testament sense of it, in which it represented fear when confronted by a vengeful God, and that used in the New Testament, where it is (in his words) "integral to the experience of grace".

The phrase was used by the Danish philosopher Søren Kierkegaard for the title of his 1843 treatise Fear and Trembling, which uses the story of the Binding of Isaac to explore the nature of faith. Clare Carlisle gives the source of this title as Philippians 2:12–13, writing that it creates a link between the two texts as works which address contemporary Christians in a particular historical situation, and which "explore a tension between responsibility and humble receptivity". She also suggests that, to Kirkegaard, "fear and trembling" represents the terrifying nature of the choice faced by Abraham, and therefore Kirkegaard's view that such fear and anxiety is an essential component of human freedom.

In "The Movement of Fish", part of the 1962 collection Drowning with Others, the American poet James Dickey writes of "the instinct of fear and trembling" that unites human beings and other animals: the critic Robert Kirschten has identified this as both a biblical allusion and a reference to the work of Kierkegaard.

== See also ==
- Fear of God
- Paul the Apostle and Jewish Christianity

== Bibliography ==
- Berger, Klaus (2003) [1991]. Identity and Experience in the New Testament. Translated by Muenchow, Charles. Minneapolis, MN: Fortress Press. ISBN 1-4514-1259-2.
- Bockmuehl, Markus (2006). The Epistle to the Philippians. London: Bloomsbury Academic. ISBN 0-8264-8107-8.
- Calvin, John (1996) [1965]. Torrance, David W.; Torrance, Thomas F. (eds.). Commentary on The Epistles of Saint Paul the Apostle to the Galatians, Ephesians, Philippians, and Colossians. Calvin's New Testament Commentaries. Vol. 11. Translated by Parker, T. H. L. Grand Rapids, MI: William B. Eerdman's Publishing Company. ISBN 0-8028-2051-4.
- Carlisle, Claire (2010). Kierkegaard's Fear and Trembling: A Reader's Guide. London: Bloomsbury Academic. ISBN 978-1-84706-461-5.
- Cefalu, Paul (2004). Moral Identity in Early Modern English Literature. Cambridge University Press. ISBN 1-139-45625-3.
- Charles, Robert Henry (1912). The Book of Enoch: 1 Enoch. Oxford University Press. OCLC 869880177.
- Ciampa, Roy E.; Rosner, Brian S. (2020). The First Letter to the Corinthians. The Pillar New Testament Commentary. Lisle, IL: Inter-Varsity Press. ISBN 978-1-78974-014-1.
- Davies, William David; Allison, Dale C. (1997). A Critical and Exegetical Commentary on the Gospel According to Saint Matthew. Vol. 3. Edinburgh: T. & T. Clark. ISBN 0-567-08518-X.
- Elior, Rachel (2016). "From the Covenant of the Rainbow to the Covenant at Sinai, from the Pilgrimage to the Temple to the Vision of the Chariot, from the Blessing of the First Fruits to the Priestly Blessing, and from the Tiqqun leil Shavu'ot to the Revelation of the Shakhinah". In Stratton, Kimberley; Lieber, Andrea (eds.). Crossing Boundaries in Early Judaism and Christianity. Supplements to the Journal for the Study of Judaism. Vol. 177. Leiden: Brill. pp. 74–113. ISSN 1384-2161.
- Elmer, Ian J. (2015). "The Pauline Letters as Community Documents". In Neil, Bronwen; Allen, Pauline (eds.). Collecting Early Christian Letters from the Apostle Paul to Late Antiquity. Cambridge University Press. pp. 37–53. ISBN 978-1-107-09186-3.
- Evans, Craig A. (2004). The Bible Knowledge Background Commentary. Vol. 2: Acts–Philemon. Colorado Springs, CO: Victor. ISBN 0-7814-4006-8.
- Grundmann, Walter (1990). "The Teacher of Righteousness of Qumran and the Question of Justification by Faith in the Theology of the Apostle Paul". In Murphy-O'Connor, Jerome; Charlesworth, James H. (eds.). Paul and the Dead Sea Scrolls. Christian Origins Library. New York: Crossroad. pp. 85–114. ISBN 0-8245-1000-3.
- Harrill, J. Albert (2000). "The Use of the New Testament in the American Slave Controversy: A Case History in the Hermeneutical Tension between Biblical Criticism and Christian Moral Debate". Religion and American Culture: A Journal of Interpretation. 10 (2): 149–186. doi:10.2307/1123945. JSTOR 1123945.
- Jewett, Robert (1970). "Conflicting Movements in the Early Church as Reflected in Philippians". Novum Testamentum. 12 (4): 362–390. doi:10.2307/1559934. JSTOR 1559934.
- Kirschten, Robert (1999). James Dickey and the Gentle Ecstasy of Earth: A Reading of the Poems. Baton Rouge, LA: LSU Press. ISBN 0-8071-2687-X.
- Ladd, George Eldon (1993) [1974]. A Theology of the New Testament. Grand Rapids, MI: Eerdmans Publishing Company. ISBN 0-8028-0680-5.
- Mesick, Clair (2024). Paul and His Rivals: Apostleship and Antagonism in the Corinthian Correspondence. Berlin: De Gruyter. doi:10.1515/9783111445441. ISBN 978-3-11-144517-5.
- Morgan, G. Campbell (2010) [1946]. The Corinthian Letters of Paul: An Exposition on I and II Corinthians. Eugene, OR: Wipf and Stock Publishers. ISBN 978-1-7252-2734-7.
- Moulton, William Fiddian (1905). "Hebrews". In Ellicott, Charles John (ed.). A Bible Commentary for English Readers. Vol. 8. London: Cassell and Company. pp. 277–350. OCLC 1041479497.
- O'Brien, Peter Thomas (1999). The Letter to the Ephesians. The Pillar New Testament Commentary. Grand Rapids, MI: William B. Eerdman's Publishing Company. ISBN 0-8028-3736-0.
- O'Regan, Cyril (2019-10-14). "Newman: Apostle of Fear and Trembling to Liberal Christianity". Church Life Journal. University of Notre Dame.
- Riddle, Donald W. (1924). "The Physical Basis of Apocalypticism". The Journal of Religion. 4 (2): 174–191. doi:10.1086/480421. JSTOR 1195335.
- Sabin, Marie Noonan (2018). Evolving Humanity and Biblical Wisdom: Reading Scripture Through the Lens of Teilhard de Chardin. Collegeville, MN: Liturgical Press. ISBN 978-0-8146-8477-1.
- Savage, Timothy B. (2009) [1995]. Power Through Weakness: Paul's Understanding of the Christian Ministry in 2 Corinthians. Cambridge University Press. ISBN 978-0-511-52045-7.
- Schipper, Jeremy (2022). Denmark Vesey's Bible: The Thwarted Revolt that Put Slavery and Scripture on Trial. Princeton and Oxford: Princeton University Press. ISBN 978-0-691-19286-4.
- Segal, Michael (2010). "Text, Translation, and Allusion: An Unidentified Biblical Reference in 1 Enoch 1:5". The Catholic Biblical Quarterly. 72 (3): 464–474. JSTOR 43726826.
- Williamson, Peter S. (2009). Ephesians. Catholic Commentary on Sacred Scripture. Grand Rapids, MI: Baker Publishing Group. ISBN 978-1-4412-0671-8.
