= P105 =

P105 may refer to:

- ARM Sebastián Lerdo de Tejada (P105), a patrol boat of the Mexican Navy
- Dominican patrol boat Independencia (P105)
- NFKB1, nuclear factor NF-kappa-B p105 subunit
- Papyrus 105, a biblical manuscript
- P105, a Latvian State first class road
