= Matthew 27:65–66 =

Matthew 27:65-66
- ← 27:64 28:1 →
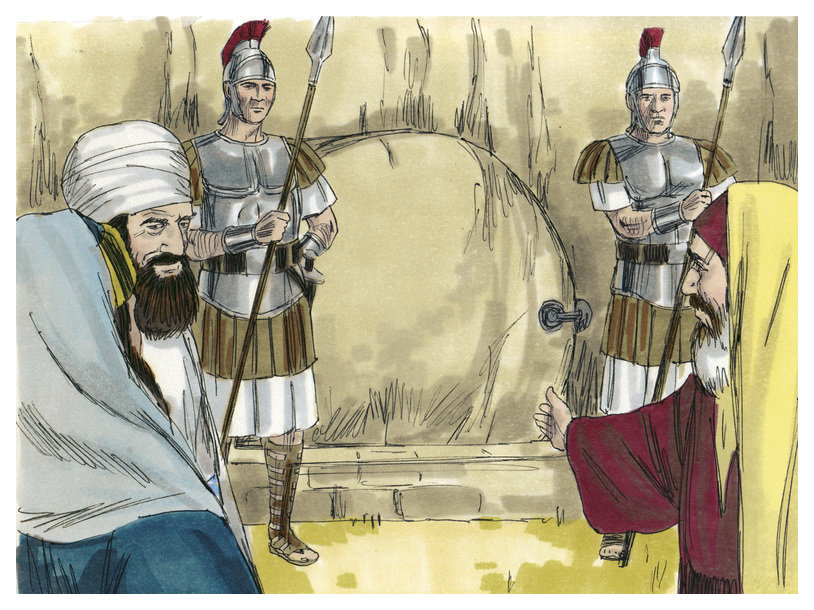
- "Tomb is secured by the Roman guard". Biblical illustrations by Jim Padgett
- Book: Gospel of Matthew
- Christian Bible part: New Testament

Matthew 27:65–66 are the final two verses of the twenty-seventh chapter of the Gospel of Matthew in the New Testament, coming after the crucifixion and entombment of Jesus. The chief priests and the Pharisees meet with Pontius Pilate, and he approves their request for a tomb guard.

== Content ==
The original Koine Greek, according to Westcott and Hort, reads:

65: εφη αυτοις ο πιλατος εχετε κουστωδιαν υπαγετε ασφαλισασθε ως οιδατε
66: οι δε πορευθεντες ησφαλισαντο τον ταφον σφραγισαντες τον λιθον μετα της κουστωδιας

In the King James Version of the Bible it is translated as:

65: Pilate said unto them, Ye have a watch: go your way, make it as sure as ye can.
66: So they went, and made the sepulchre sure, sealing the stone, and setting a watch.

The modern World English Bible translates the passage as:

65: Pilate said to them, "You have a guard. Go, make it as secure as you can."
66: So they went with the guard and made the tomb secure, sealing the stone.

The New International Version reads:

65: "Take a guard," Pilate answered. "Go, make the tomb as secure as you know how."
66: So they went and made the tomb secure by putting a seal on the stone and posting the guard.

For a collection of other versions see BibleHub Matthew 27:65-66.

== Analysis ==
One of the primary debates over this verse is whether the word in Greek: ἔχετε, ekete, is imperative or indicative, and therefore whether the guards sent are Roman soldiers or Jewish temple guards. "You have a guard" is ambiguous and can mean either taking some of Pilate's guard, or dispatching some of their own guards. Protestant theologian Heinrich Meyer names Martin Luther, François Vatable (Vatablus), Wolf, Paulus, de Wette, Keim and Steinmeyer as historic commentators favouring the Roman interpretation, noting that on the other hand the Vulgate text, Habetis custodiam, points towards a Jewish guard interpretation.

Among modern writers, Craig Keener argues that the priests would have had no need to approach Pilate if they simply wanted to use their own forces for the guarding. The Greek term used in this verse, Greek: κουστωδίας, koustodia, is a borrowing from the Latin custodia, and thus also implies Roman forces. This is the same wording as is used at Matthew 27:27, where the soldiers are clearly Roman guards. However, R. T. France argues that the guards were probably Jewish temple guards. If Pilate was giving some of his own soldiers, "take a guard", the New International Version's reading (see above), would have been the likely reply. The less direct "you have a guard" leaves open that they could be temple guards. At Matthew 28:11 the guards report to the priests and not to Pilate, and at Matthew 28:14 Pilate finding out about the events was just a possibility. An unlikely turn of events if they had been his own forces. However, had the guard been the Temple guard, there would have been no need for the High Priest to bribe them. They would have been within his jurisdictional command. Nor would he have felt a need to protect them from Pilate.

The guards seal the stone at the entrance to the tomb. This parallels the sealing of the lions' den at Daniel 6:17 in the Old Testament, and may be a reference. The wording implies some sort of physical seal, such as wax or clay, to make any attempt to open the tomb obvious. Matthew gives no details on how or what it was sealed with. The non-canonical Gospel of Peter adds far more information stating that the tomb was closed with seven wax seals.

== Sources ==
- Davies, William David; Allison, Dale C. Jr. (1997). A Critical and Exegetical Commentary on the Gospel According to Saint Matthew. International critical commentary on the Holy Scriptures of the Old and New Testaments. Vol. 1. Edinburgh: T. & T. Clark. ISBN 9780567094810.
- France, R.T. (2007). The Gospel of Matthew. Wm. B. Eerdmans Publishing.
- Harrington, Daniel J. (1991). The Gospel of Matthew. Liturgical Press.

Preceded by Matthew 27:64	Gospel of Matthew; Chapter 27	Succeeded by Matthew 28:1
