= Matthew 28:4 =

- ← 28:3 28:5 →
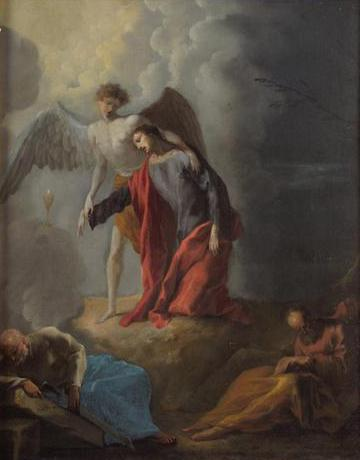
- Johann Heinrich Schönfeld's depiction of the angel guiding the risen Jesus past the collapsed guards
- Book: Gospel of Matthew
- Christian Bible part: New Testament

Matthew 28:4 is the fourth verse of the twenty-eighth chapter of the Gospel of Matthew in the New Testament. This verse is part of the resurrection narrative; describing the reaction of the tomb guards after the arrival of the angel of the Lord and the occurrence of an earthquake that opened the tomb.

== Content ==
The original Koine Greek, according to Westcott and Hort, reads:

απο δε του φοβου αυτου εσεισθησαν οι
τηρουντες και εγενηθησαν ως νεκροι

In the King James Version of the Bible it is translated as:

And for fear of him the keepers
did shake, and became as dead men.

The modern World English Bible translates the passage as:

For fear of him, the guards shook, and became like dead men. (Note: For a collection of other versions see BibleHub Matthew 28:4.)

== Analysis ==
This verse returns to the guards, literally "those keeping [watch]" (Ancient Greek: οἱ τηροῦντες, hoi tērountes), who appeared throughout Matthew's crucifixion narrative, but not in the other gospels. The same words are used for the guards as those at the crucifixion introduced at Matthew 27:36. Those guards are also frightened by an earthquake at Matthew 27:54, but in that instance the guards are converted, whereas here these guards are fearful, but give no indication of conversion. In Mark it is the women who are afraid of the angel, but in Matthew, the women were bystanders and the line about fear was transferred from the women to the guards.

For Robert Gundry, the weakness of the guards serves to contrast with the angel's power. That the guards are now as dead, while Jesus is alive, also serves as an ironic reversal. It is also something of a pun to have the guards "shake" ("tremble" or "shaken", from Greek: ἐσείσθησαν, eseisthēsan; a plural equivalent of [the earth was] "shaken" from singular ἐσείσθη, eseisthē, in Matthew 27:51) when confronted with an earthquake, perhaps reflecting the author of Matthew's fondness for wordplay.

Falling "like dead" occurs again in the New Testament at Revelation 1:17, where John did so when presented with his vision of 'the exalted Son of Man'. Similar expressions are also used in contemporary Greco-Roman pagan literature when mortals are confronted by gods. Fear is also the standard reaction in the Bible when confronted by the divine, and this verse is a variation on the expression "fear and trembling" that commonly describes such incidents.

The collapse of the guards removes them from the rest of this section of the narrative. Eduard Schweizer notes that the fainting of the guards and the possible absence of the women at this point indicate that Jesus may have emerged physically from the tomb during the period when no witnesses could have seen him.

== Sources ==
- Nolland, John (2005). The Gospel of Matthew: a commentary on the Greek text. The New International Greek Testament Commentary. Vol. 1. Wm. B. Eerdmans Publishing. ISBN 9780802823892.

Preceded by Matthew 28:3	Gospel of Matthew; Chapter 28	Succeeded by Matthew 28:5
