= Papyrus 105 =

- New Testament manuscript
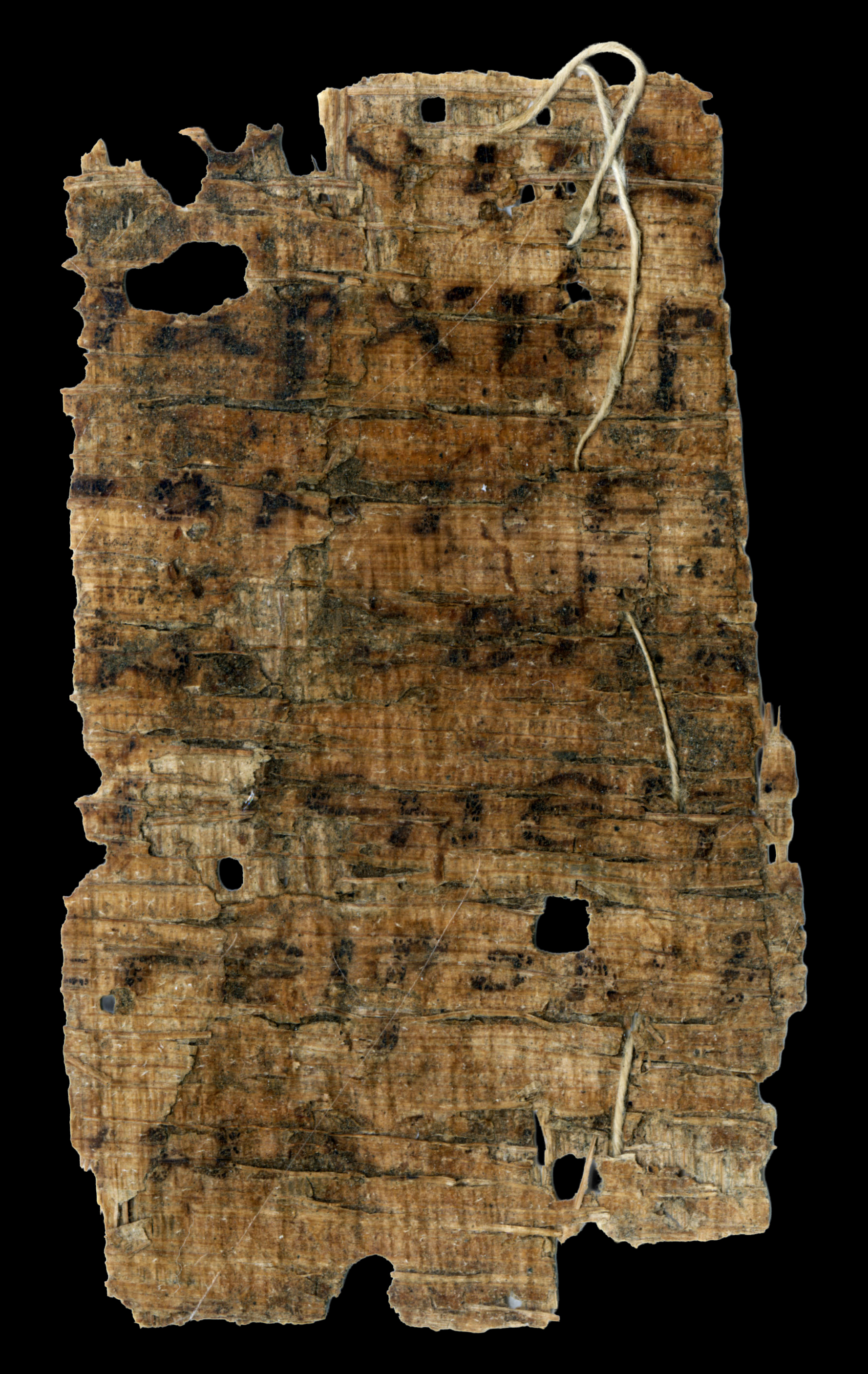
- Recto, Matthew 27:62-64
- Name: P. Oxy. 4406
- Sign: 𝔓^{105}
- Text: Gospel of Matthew 27:62-64; 28:2-5
- Date: 5th / 6th century
- Script: Greek
- Found: Oxyrhynchus, Egypt
- Now at: Sackler Library
- Cite: J. D. Thomas, OP LXIV (1997), pp. 12-13
- Size: [22] x [12] cm
- Type: Alexandrian text-type
- Category: I

Papyrus 105 (in the Gregory-Aland numbering), designated by 𝔓^{105}, is a copy of the New Testament in Greek. It is a papyrus manuscript of the Gospel of Matthew. The surviving texts of Matthew are verses 27:62-64; 28:2-5, they are in a fragmentary condition. The manuscript has been paleographically estimated to date back to the 5th or 6th century CE.

== Text ==
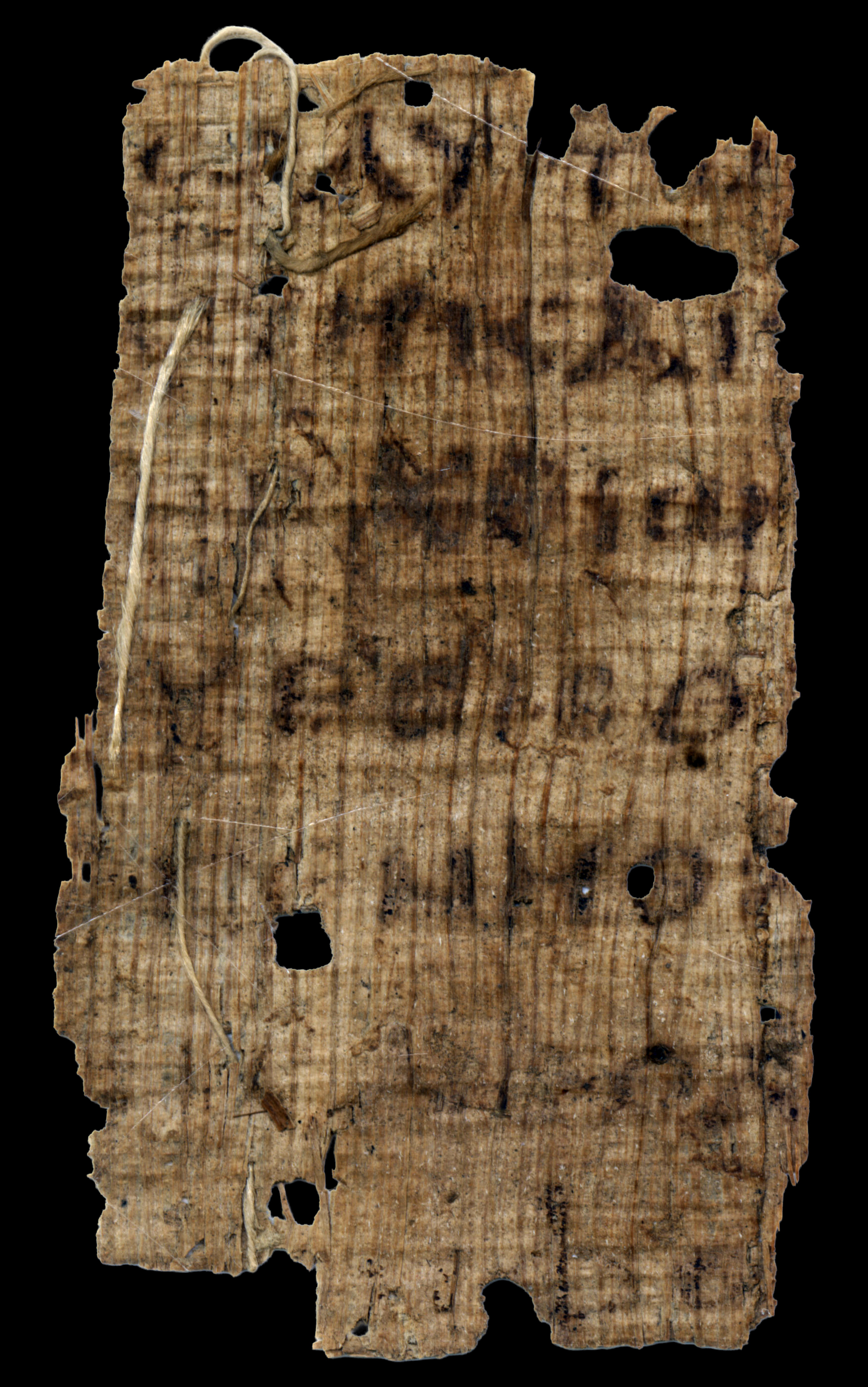
Verso, Matthew 28:2-5

The Greek text of the codex is a representative of the Alexandrian text-type.

== Location ==
The manuscript is currently housed at the Sackler Library (Papyrology Rooms, P. Oxy. 4406) at Oxford.

== See also ==
- List of New Testament papyri
- Matthew 27, Matthew 28
- Oxyrhynchus Papyri
