= Matthew 28:2 =

- ← 28:1 28:3 →
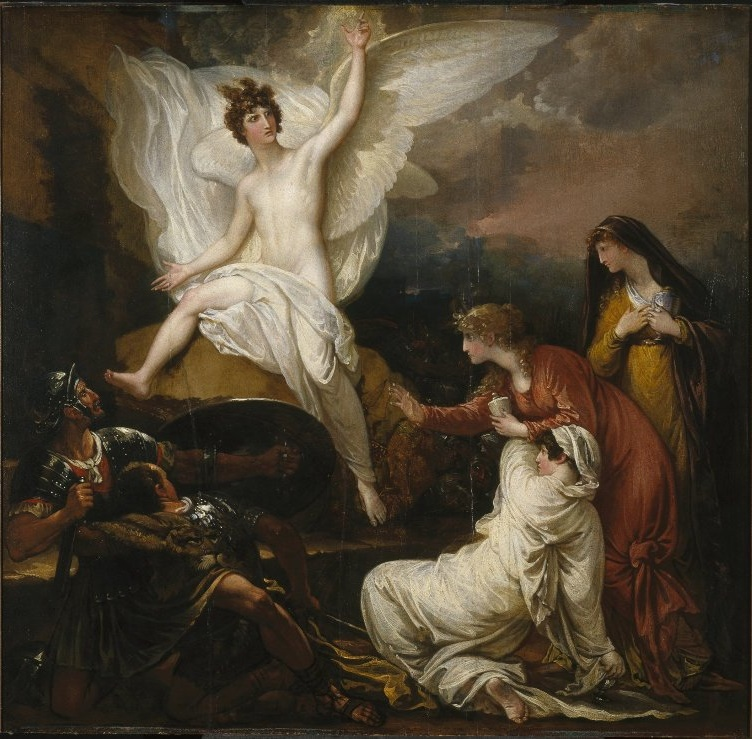
- Benjamin West's The Angel at the Tomb of Christ.
- Book: Gospel of Matthew
- Christian Bible part: New Testament

Matthew 28:2 is the second verse of the twenty-eighth chapter of the Gospel of Matthew in the New Testament. This verse is part of the resurrection narrative. Mary Magdalene and "the other Mary" were approaching Jesus' tomb after the crucifixion, when an earthquake occurred and an angel appeared.

== Content ==
The original Koine Greek, according to Westcott and Hort, reads:

και ιδου σεισμος εγενετο μεγας αγγελος γαρ κυριου καταβας εξ
ουρανου και προσελθων απεκυλισεν τον λιθον και εκαθητο επανω αυτου

In the King James Version of the Bible, this verse is translated as:

And, behold, there was a great earthquake: for the angel of the Lord descended from
heaven, and came and rolled back the stone from the door, and sat upon it.

The modern World English Bible translates the passage as:

Behold, there was a great earthquake, for an angel of the Lord descended from
the sky, and came and rolled away the stone from the door, and sat on it. (Note: For a collection of other versions see BibleHub Matthew 28:2.)

== Analysis ==
Scholars accept that this verse is a reworking of Mark 16:5. In Mark it is implied that the "young man" is an angel or something similar, but this verse makes this explicit. The verse strives to make the events as dramatic as possible: Greek: ιδου (idou, "behold") shows that something important is about to follow. It also adds "a great earthquake" (Greek: σεισμος εγενετο μεγας, seismos egeneto megas) and a dramatic descent from heaven. Francis Beare sees this as a haggadic expansion upon Mark, and argues that no source beyond Mark is needed to explain where this passage originates.

There are many parallels in this verse to earlier events in Matthew. "Angels of the Lord" play an important role in the infancy narrative, appearing at Matthew 1:20, 1:24, 2:13 and 2:19. That an angel appears again at the end of the story links it back to the opening chapters. "Coming down from heaven" parallels the wording of Matthew 3:16, the climax of the baptism scene. An earthquake had also earlier occurred at Matthew 27:51, marking the moment of Jesus' death. Jesus predicts earthquakes as a sign of the end times at Matthew 24:7, and earthquakes are also a common occurrence in the Book of Revelation. W D Davies and Dale Allison thus see the earthquake in this verse also having eschatological significance. Since an earthquake marked Jesus' death, Gundry suggests that this one is marking the exact moment of the resurrection.

Matthew is the only gospel which describes how the stone was moved. In Mark 16:3, the women had worried about how they were to move the stone to anoint the body. In Matthew, there was no need to enter the tomb, and in his version this is not mentioned as a concern of the women. Why the stone is moved is not directly answered. Gundry suggests that as the earthquake marks the moment of the resurrection, the moving of the stone was to allow Jesus' to exit the tomb, though he might have exited invisibly as no one is reported to have observed him at this time. Peter Chrysologus and John Chrysostom offer a different view, arguing that Jesus had no need for the door to be open to leave. Rather they, and many modern scholars, believe that the stone was rolled away so that the women and other witnesses could see that the tomb was now empty providing concrete evidence for the resurrection.

Some commentators consider this verse to be unclear as to whether the women introduced in the previous verse were present for these events, or only come upon the tomb later. Protestant theologian Heinrich Meyer criticized the argument of Sebastian Castellio, Kuinoel, Kern and Ebrard that the earthquake had happened when the women arrived, arguing himself that the event took place in their presence. Among modern writers, Davies and Allison argue that since the women were just introduced, it is implied that they were eyewitnesses to these events. Though other commentators disagree. In the apocryphal Gospel of Peter the events are further elaborated upon and there are witnesses to the resurrection itself.

The angel sits upon the stone outside of the tomb. This conflicts with the other gospels which have the angel, or angels, inside the tomb. Those who believe in the inerrancy of the Bible have proposed a number of explanations to account for this. St. Augustine suggested that there could be two sets of angels. One outside the tomb and two inside the tomb. The women first talk to the angel outside, and then the angel inside. Only Matthew mentions the first conversation, while the other gospels only mention the second. Alternatively Augustine writes that by inside the tomb Mark and the other writers are referring to being inside an outer tomb enclosure, such as a wall around the area. Thus the same angels can be described as being both inside the tomb, and sitting on a stone outside it.

While some commentators might also interpret the earthquake described in this verse as a geological aftershock to the earthquake associated with the crucifixion (Matthew 27:51), scholarly analysis typically emphasizes the passage's literary function. Within this framework, the earthquake serves as a 'theophany'—a manifestation of the divine—that acts to bookend the narrative of Jesus' passion and resurrection, reinforcing the cosmic significance of the moment rather than describing a strictly seismic event.

== Textual witnesses ==
Some early manuscripts containing the text of this verse are:

- Codex Vaticanus (~325-350)
- Codex Sinaiticus (~330-360)
- Codex Bezae (~400)
- Codex Washingtonianus (~400)
- Codex Alexandrinus (~400-440)
- Codex Ephraemi Rescriptus (~450)
- Papyrus 105 (5th/6th century)
- Codex Purpureus Rossanensis (6th century)

== Notes ==
Preceded by Matthew 28:1	Gospel of Matthew; Chapter 28	Succeeded by Matthew 28:3
