= Matthew 27:63 =

- ← 27:62 27:64 →
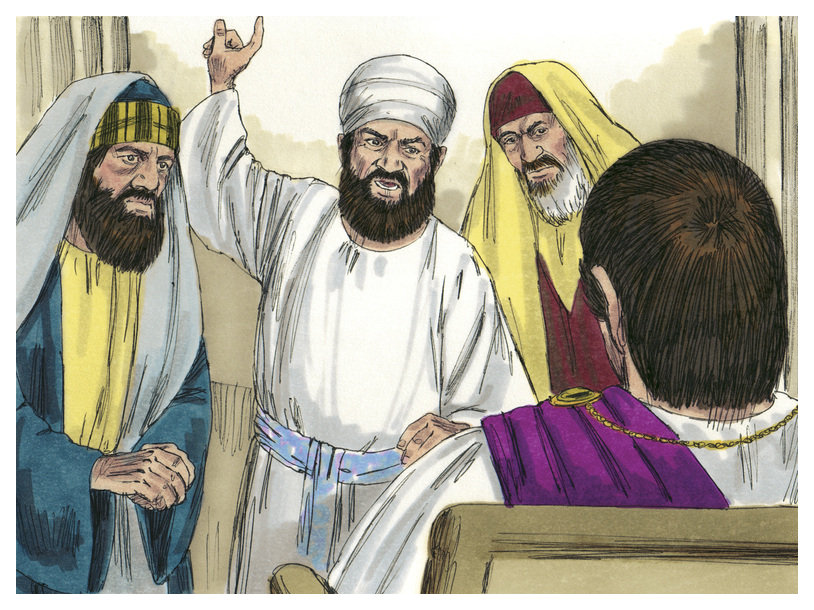
- "The chief priests meet Pontius Pilate". Biblical illustrations by Jim Padgett
- Book: Gospel of Matthew
- Christian Bible part: New Testament

Matthew 27:63 is the sixty-third verse of the twenty-seventh chapter of the Gospel of Matthew in the New Testament. This verse occurs after the crucifixion and entombment of Jesus. In it the chief priests and the Pharisees are meeting with Pontius Pilate.

== Content ==
The original Koine Greek, according to Westcott and Hort, reads:

λεγοντες κυριε εμνησθημεν οτι εκεινος ο πλανος
ειπεν ετι ζων μετα τρεις ημερας εγειρομαι

In the King James Version of the Bible it is translated as:

saying, "Sir, we remember, while He was still alive, how
that deceiver said, 'After three days I will rise.'

The modern World English Bible translates the passage as:

saying, "Sir, we remember what that deceiver said while
he was still alive: 'After three days I will rise again.'

For a collection of other versions see BibleHub Matthew 27:63

== Analysis ==
The chief priests and Pharisees call Pilate sir or lord, which would have been the accepted form of address to the Roman prefect. Keener notes that this evidence for a close relationship would not have been well received by Matthew's post-revolt Jewish audience. Earlier in Matthew this same title has been regularly used to address Jesus, creating further contrast between the pious and those before Pilate.

The priests are well aware of Jesus' promise to return. Jesus has made such pledges at Matthew 16:21, 17:9, 17:23, 20:19. The pledge is later confirmed by the angel at Matthew 28:6. How the priests came to learn of the pledge is debated by scholars. All the previous discussions had been between only Jesus and his disciples. Morris does not believe this is a problem, as at least one of Jesus' promises was made before a general audience. That the priests so firmly remember the pledge is in distinct contrast to the disciples, who fled and are not mentioned as remembering it.

Everywhere else in Matthew the claim is that Jesus will rise "on the third day," but in this verse it is "after three days." Davies and Allison note that the priests were false witnesses, and may have gotten the details wrong. In this era "three days" was also an approximate term that could also mean "a few days" so some flexibility was possible.

Preceded by Matthew 27:62	Gospel of Matthew; Chapter 27	Succeeded by Matthew 27:64
