= John 20:17 =

- ← 20:16 20:18 →
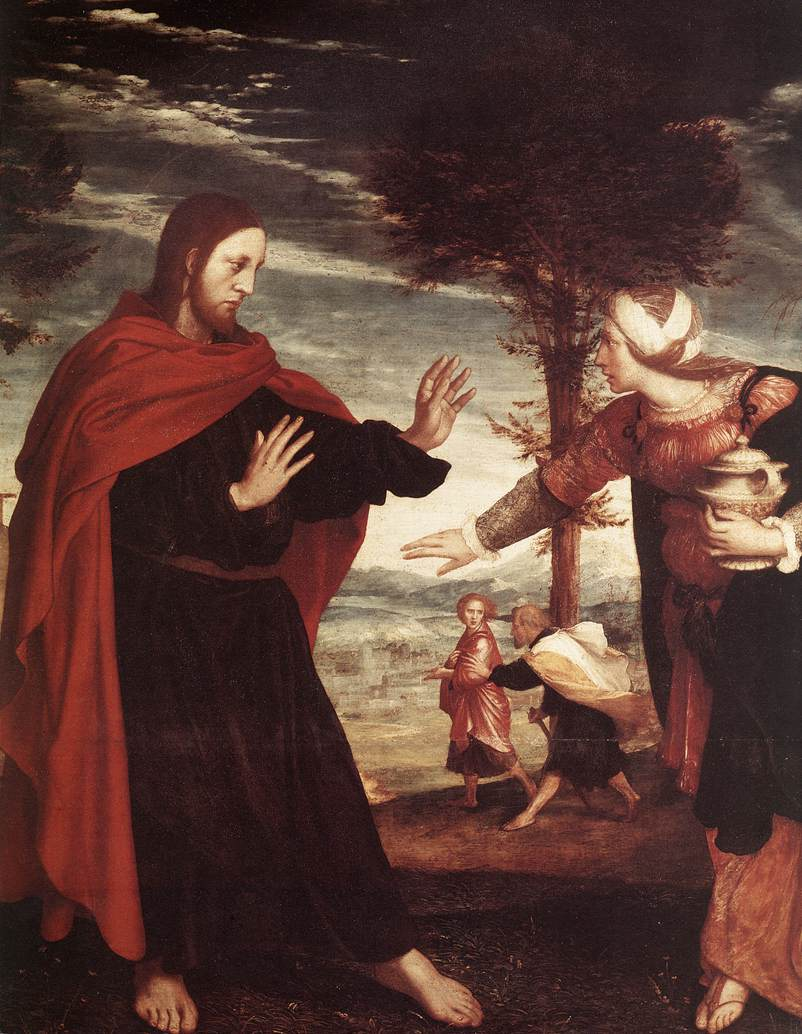
- Jesus telling Mary not to touch him, by Hans Holbein the Younger
- Book: Gospel of John
- Christian Bible part: New Testament

John 20:17 is the seventeenth verse of the twentieth chapter of the Gospel of John in the New Testament. It contains Jesus' response to Mary Magdalene, just after he meets her outside his tomb after his resurrection.

== Content ==
The original Koine Greek, according to the Textus Receptus, reads:

λεγει αυτη ο ιησους μη μου απτου ουπω γαρ αναβεβηκα προς τον πατερα μου πορευου δε προς τους αδελφους μου και ειπε αυτοις αναβαινω προς τον πατερα μου και πατερα υμων και θεον μου και θεον υμων.

In the King James Version of the Bible the text reads:

Jesus saith unto her, Touch me not; for I am not yet ascended to my Father: but go to my brethren, and say unto them, I ascend unto my Father, and your Father; and to my God, and your God.

The English Standard Version translates the passage as:

Jesus said to her, "Do not cling to me, for I have not yet ascended to the Father; but go to my brothers and say to them, 'I am ascending to my Father and your Father, to my God and your God.'"

The Modern English Version instead reads:

Jesus said to her, "Stop holding on to Me, for I have not yet ascended to My Father. But go to My brothers and tell them, 'I am ascending to My Father and your Father, to My God and your God.' "

For a collection of other versions see BibleHub John 20:17.

== Analysis ==
Verse 1 and verses 11 onwards record Mary Magdalene's discovery of the empty tomb and her meeting with the risen Jesus. Similarly in the longer ending of Mark's Gospel (Mark 16:9), Mary was the first person to whom Jesus showed himself alive after his resurrection.

=== Noli me tangere ===
The passage reads "touch me not": in Latin, this phrase is translated as noli me tangere. The words do not make clear how Mary is touching him. H.C.G. Moule speculates that she likely grabbed his arm or hand to try to verify his physical existence.

An important issue is why Jesus prevents Mary from touching or holding him, especially since in verse 27, he allows Thomas to probe his open wounds. It also seems somewhat contradictory to the other Gospels: Matthew 28:9 states that the women who found Jesus "came and held him by the feet, and worshipped him", and no mention is made there of Jesus disapproving.

Biblical scholar Raymond E. Brown has listed a wide array of explanations for this injunction:

- Jesus' wounds were still sore so he did not like being touched.
- Kraft proposes that the prohibition was because it was against ritual to touch a dead body.
- Chrysostom and Theophylact argue that Jesus was asking that more respect be shown to him. This theory is sometimes linked to the notion that it was not appropriate for a woman to touch Jesus although it was fine for a man like Thomas.
- C. Spicq sees the risen Jesus as the equivalent of one of the Jewish high priests who should not be sullied by physical contact.
- Kastner, who believes that Christ returned in the nude, believes the prohibition was so that Mary would not be tempted by Jesus' body.
- Mary should not touch Jesus because she should not need physical proof of the resurrection but should trust in her faith.
- Rudolf Bultmann sees the phrase as an indirect way of saying that the risen Jesus is not tangible.
- Moule considers Jesus' intervention to be not a prohibition on being touched, but an assurance that the touching is not needed since he has not yet returned to the Father and is still firmly here on Earth. His use of the present tense is said to mean that he should not be touched just yet but could be touched in future.
- Some link it with the next verse and state that they should be read as one to mean, "Do not touch me, but go tell my disciples of the news."
- The reformer John Calvin argues that Jesus did not forbid simple touching but rather that Jesus had no problems until the women began to cling to him as if they are trying to hold him in the corporeal world at which point Jesus told them to let go. Some translations thus use touch for the seemingly-permitted actions in Mark and cling for the action Jesus chides Mary for in this verse.
- C. K. Barrett mentions the possibility that between this verse and John 20:22, Jesus fully ascends to heaven.
- R. Hepburn posits that while Matthew 28:9 records Mary Magdalene and the other Mary taking hold of Jesus' feet and worshiping Him after His resurrection, the encounter recorded in this verse is a different (likely earlier) encounter when Mary Magdalene is alone with the risen Christ. She is not permitted to touch Him, thus preventing any possibility of the appearance of impropriety by having other witness(es).

There are also a number of scholars who have proposed alternative translations. They are not based on direct linguistic evidence but are rather attempts to harmonise the phrase with other parts of the Bible. There is also some evidence that the wording may have been mangled.

- Some scholars eliminate the negative, leaving the phrase as "touch me" and imply that Jesus is telling Mary to verify his physical form.
- W.E.P. Cotter and others argue that the text should actually read "do not fear me."
- W.D. Morris believes it should read "do not fear to touch me."

What not touching has to do with the ascension is also unclear. Barrett states that the phrase seems to have the paradoxical meaning that Jesus can be freely touched once he has ascended. Or rather, it may imply that her touch may somehow hinder his ascension into Heaven.

Jesus mentions that his ultimate fate is to return to his father, which is read as him making it clear that his resurrection has not made him king of the earth but king of heaven, and his return in physical form is only temporary.

=== Message to the disciples ===
Jesus then sends Mary to tell his brethren or brothers of the news. Elsewhere in the New Testament, the word "brethren" had been used to describe only Jesus' family, for example in John 2:12: "he went down to Capernaum, he, and his mother, and his brethren, and his disciples", so this phrase is very unusual. It also appears at Matthew 28:10: John Nolland suggests that there may be a shared source used by the two evangelists.

Jerome relates Jesus' direction to the disciples, "Tell my brothers (nuntiate fratribus meis)" to meet Jesus in Galilee to Psalm 22:22: "I will tell forth (Adnuntiabo) your name to my brothers (fratribus meis)."

Mary delivers the message to his disciples, and scholars agree that they were the group Jesus was referring to as "brothers". According to Henry Alford this is said to show that even after the resurrection Jesus is fully human and a brother to other men: "he has not put off his humanity, nor his love for his own, in his resurrection state".

The message Jesus gives Mary has been the subject of detailed analysis. The assertion that God is both Father and God to Jesus is central to the Monophysitism/Diophysitism debate. The Diphysitists take it as proof that Jesus as well as being God was also a human under God. This passage is often linked with Jesus now referring to his disciples as brothers. Since they are now all brothers they share the same father in God. Since the resurrection Jesus has been forged into a permanent link between humanity and God.

The message Jesus gives to Mary does not mention the resurrection, only that Jesus is soon returning to his father. This is said to show that the great joy of the resurrection is not the return to life but rather joining with God as this is the only aspect of it Jesus felt necessary to immediately tell his disciples. Some thus read the passage as meaning that to Jesus the ascension is far more important than the resurrection. Reading this verse in isolation or disregarding other notions, some even feel that there is no such thing as resurrection; it was purely ascension.

== In Islam ==
A similar verse appears in the Quran when Allah will ask Jesus on judgement day if he told people to take him and Mary as deities besides Allah in Chapter 5 verse 117:

(Jesus will say) Never said I to them aught except what Thou didst command me to say to wit 'Worship God my Lord and your Lord'; and I was a witness over them whilst I dwelt amongst them; when Thou didst take me up thou wast the Watcher over them and Thou art a Witness to all things. (Abdullah Yusuf Ali's translation)

I said not to them except what You commanded me - to worship Allah, my Lord and your Lord. And I was a witness over them as long as I was among them; but when You took me up, You were the Observer over them, and You are, over all things, Witness. (Saheeh International)

For a collection of other versions, see Noble Quran translations.

== Usage ==
This verse has long been used to challenge the Trinitarian doctrine, which has been under debate before 200 A.D. This verse appears to suggest that Jesus says that there is another God besides him.

"... I ascend to my Father and your Father, and to my God and your God." (John 20:17)

Tertullian, one of the early Catholic Church Fathers, was utterly opposed to the doctrine of the Trinity.

Tertullian's belief was, "The Son, on this theory, is not God himself, nor is he divine in the same sense that the Father is. Rather, the Son is "divine" in that he is made of a portion of the matter that the Father is composed of. This makes them "one substance" or not different as to essence. But the Son isn’t the same god as the Father."

== See also ==
- Unitarianism
- Trinitarianism

== Sources ==
- Barrett, C.K. (1978). The Gospel According to John (2nd ed.). London: SPCK.
- Brown, Raymond E., "The Gospel According to John: XIII-XXI" The Anchor Bible Series Volume 29A New York: Doubleday & Company, 1970.
- Calvin, J., Commentary on John 20:16-18
- Jesus Appears to His Disciples

| Preceded by John 20:16 | Gospel of John; Chapter 20 | Succeeded by John 20:18 |
