= John 20:14 =

- ← 20:13 20:15 →
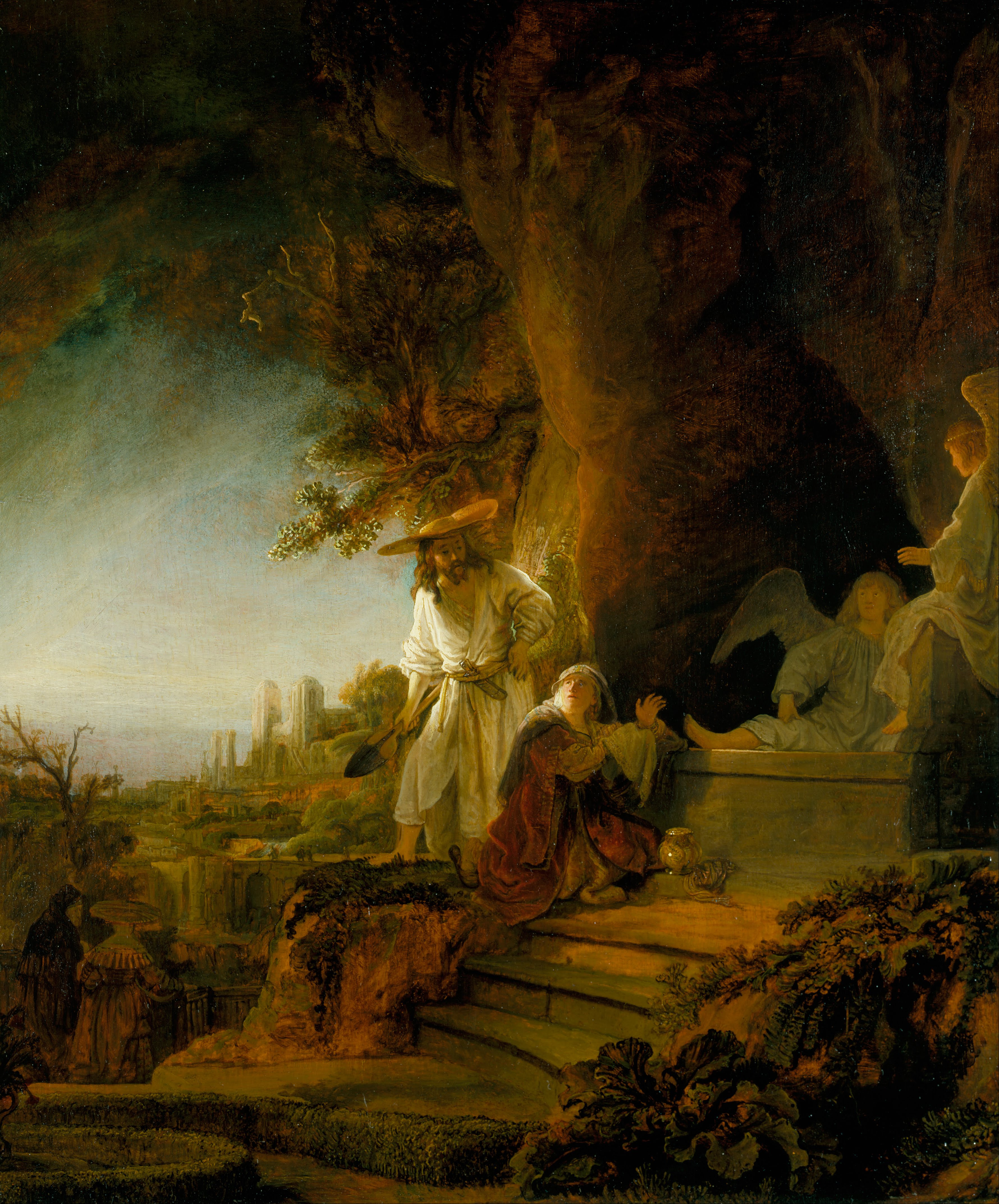
- Rembrandt's portrayal of the moment when Mary turns her head and sees the newly risen Jesus.
- Book: Gospel of John
- Christian Bible part: New Testament

John 20:14 is the fourteenth verse of the twentieth chapter of the Gospel of John in the New Testament of the Christian Bible. In this verse, Mary Magdalene has just finished speaking to the angels she has seen in Jesus's empty tomb. She then turns and sees the risen Jesus, but fails to recognize him.

== Content ==
The King James Version translates this verse as:

And when she had thus said, she turned herself back, and saw Jesus standing, and knew not that it was Jesus.

In the New King James Version, the wording is:

Now when she had said this, she turned around and saw Jesus standing there, and did not know that it was Jesus.

For a collection of other versions see BibleHub John 20:14.

== Analysis ==
In the Gospel of John, this is the first moment when anyone sees Jesus after his resurrection. It is significant that it is Mary Magdalene who is the first to see the risen Jesus, but it raises the question of why she does not recognise him; in the next verse she mistakes him for the gardener. One interpretation is that the risen Jesus did not have the same physical form as before, but rather a wholly new appearance. The reformer John Calvin argued that the fault is with Mary, seeing her blindness in the face of Jesus as a metaphor for those who fail to see Jesus despite his divine nature. This episode does not appear in the other Gospels, but in Luke 24:16 there is a comparable meeting with the risen Jesus when "something" prevents two travellers who are on their way to Emmaus from recognising him. The Jerusalem Bible notes in regard to both Luke 24:16 and John 20:14 that "the disciples do not at first recognise the Lord: they need a word or a sign".

That the angels of the previous two verses are from this point wholly forgotten offers German theologian Rudolf Schnackenburg evidence that the angels were a later addition to the text, and that the original narrative did not include them.

Preceded by John 20:13	Gospel of John; Chapter 20	Succeeded by John 20:15
