= Matthew 27:62 =

- ← 27:61 27:63 →
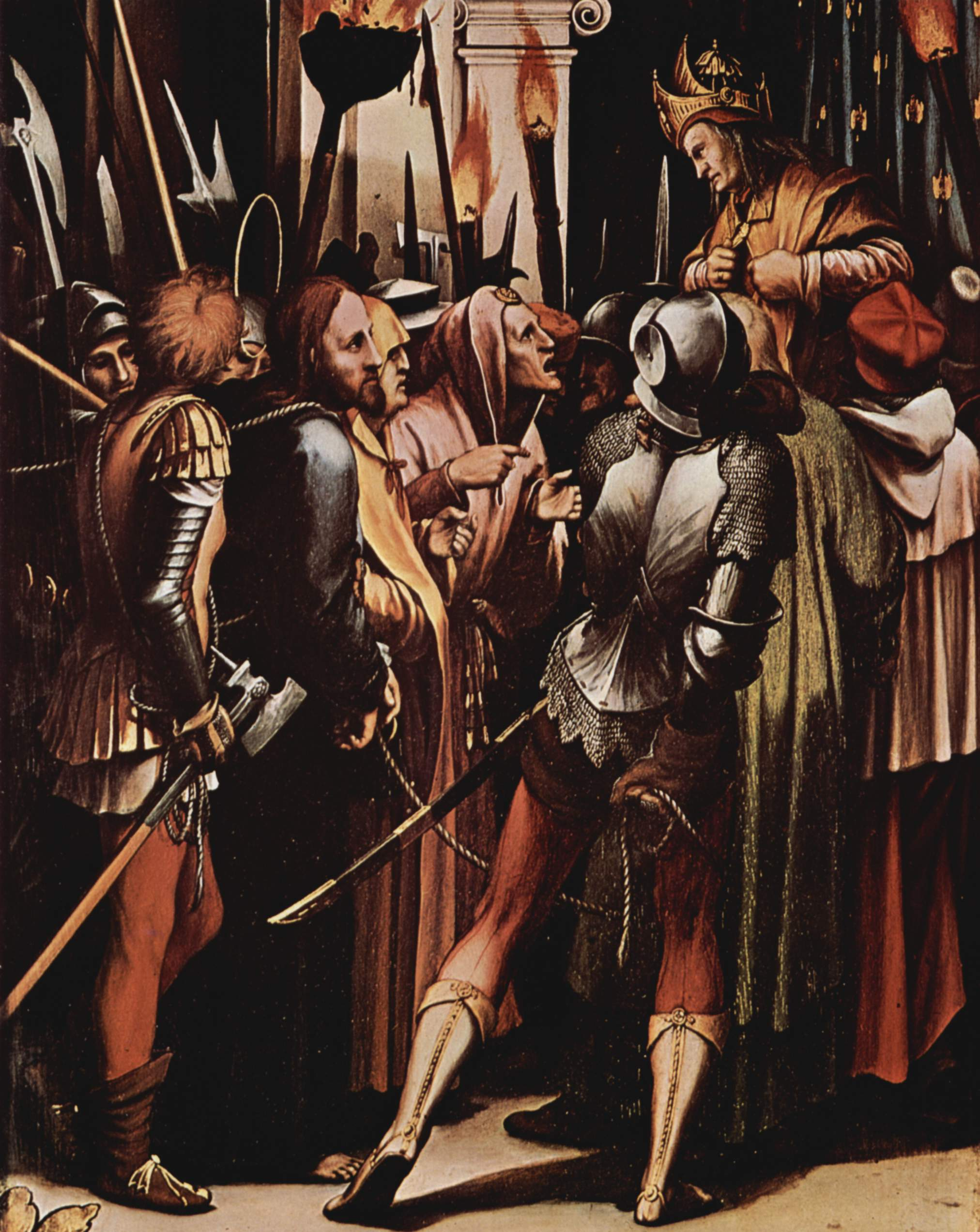
- Hans Holbein's depiction of the leaders gathered before Pilate, c. 1523
- Book: Gospel of Matthew
- Christian Bible part: New Testament

Matthew 27:62 is the sixty-second verse of the twenty-seventh chapter of the Gospel of Matthew in the New Testament. This verse occurs after the crucifixion and entombment of Jesus. In it the leaders of the Jewish community meet with Pontius Pilate.

== Content ==
The original Koine Greek, according to Westcott and Hort, reads:

τη δε επαυριον ητις εστιν μετα την παρασκευην συνηχθησαν
οι αρχιερεις και οι φαρισαιοι προς πιλατον

In the King James Version of the Bible it is translated as:

Now the next day, that followed the day of the preparation,
the chief priests and Pharisees came together unto Pilate,

The modern World English Bible translates the passage as:

Now on the next day, which was the day after the Preparation Day, the
chief priests and the Pharisees were gathered together to Pilate

For a collection of other versions see BibleHub Matthew 27:62

== Analysis ==
"The day of the preparation" is a specific Greco-Jewish term referring to the day before Sabbath, when the Sabbath meal was prepared. The time information is thus a complex way of stating that these events occurred on Sabbath itself. The obscure term is also used at Mark 15:42 in a different part of the burial narrative, and it is likely Matthew's usage is borrowed from there. Morris speculates that the author of Matthew may have used this roundabout phrasing as he did not want to directly mention Sabbath in connection with these negative events. Harrington considers a meeting of such religious leaders with Pilate on Sabbath to be historically improbable. An event of this nature would certainly have run counter to what was considered acceptable on festival Sabbath. France thus finds it odd that the author of Matthew chooses to avoid directly mentioning that this meeting happened on the Saturday. He speculates that Matthew may have been working to emphasize that the day of importance was that of the crucifixion, not this day.

The Pharisees, a regular villain in Matthew, reappear in this verse after being absent from crucifixion story. This is the only verse they appear during the passion narrative in any of the synoptic gospels. They join the chief priests, who in Matthew were the main advocates for Jesus' death. This same pairing occurred at Matthew 21:45. Davies and Allison also note that this scene is similar in wording to Matthew 2:4, where the Jewish leaders plot against the infant Jesus. The description of the petitioners coming "together to Pilate" implies a formal and solemn meeting. Historically the Pharisees and the priests were fierce rivals. Their scheming together is thus a sign of how great a threat Jesus is to the ruling powers in Matthew's story.

Preceded by Matthew 27:61	Gospel of Matthew; Chapter 27	Succeeded by Matthew 27:63
