= William Hosmer =

American anti-slavery advocate (1810–1889)

The Reverend William Hosmer

Orders
- Ordination: 1833
- Rank: Minister

Personal details
- Born: May 27, 1810 Near Brimfield, Massachusetts, U.S.
- Died: July 17, 1889 (aged 79) Auburn, New York, U.S.
- Spouse: Martha Matilde Gamage (died 1878)
- Children: 6
- Profession: Newspaper editor
- Education: Franklin Academy

William Hosmer (May 27, 1810 – July 17, 1889) was an American anti-slavery author and editor, and a Methodist minister.

== Biography ==
Hosmer was born on May 27, 1810, near the town of Brimfield, Massachusetts, to Clara (née Needham) and Eleazer Hosmer. He studied at the Franklin Academy in Plattsburgh, New York.

In 1831, Hosmer was admitted as a probationer to the Genesee Conference of the Methodist Church, and was ordained as a minister two years later.

Between 1848 and 1856 Hosmer was the editor of the Northern Christian Advocate newspaper, owned by the Methodist General Conference. Hosmer was a strong believer in Wesleyan philosophy, and during his incumbency at the Advocate he was a strong advocate for both antislavery and temperance issues. Due to a schism within the Methodist church, his stance eventually led to his replacement as editor in June 1856 by Rev. F. G. Hibbard. Following his removal from the Northern Christian Advocate, a new paper called The Northern Independent was established and Hosmer appointed as its editor. Hosmer remained editor of The Northern Independent until "stricken by paralysis ... while delivering a temperance address" in 1871. He also wrote articles and essays for other periodicals, including the Methodist Quarterly Review.

Hosmer was a charter trustee of the Genesee College in Lima, New York, which later became Syracuse University.

He died in his home in Auburn, New York, on the morning of Monday, June 17, 1889.

== Family ==
Hosmer married Martha Matilde Gamage sometime before 1835. Together they had six surviving children:

- John Gamage (1835–1906)
- Julia A. (1837–1916)
- William M. (1839–1921)
- Martha Matilda (1841–1921)
- Clara Elizabeth (1845–1903)
- Mary H. (1852–)

== Select bibliography ==
- The higher law, in its relations to civil government : with particular reference to slavery, and the Fugitive Slave Law (Auburn: Derby & Miller, 1952), dedicated to William Seward.
- Slavery and the church (Auburn: W.J. Moses, 1853)
