= Matthew 27:64 =

- ← 27:63 27:65 →
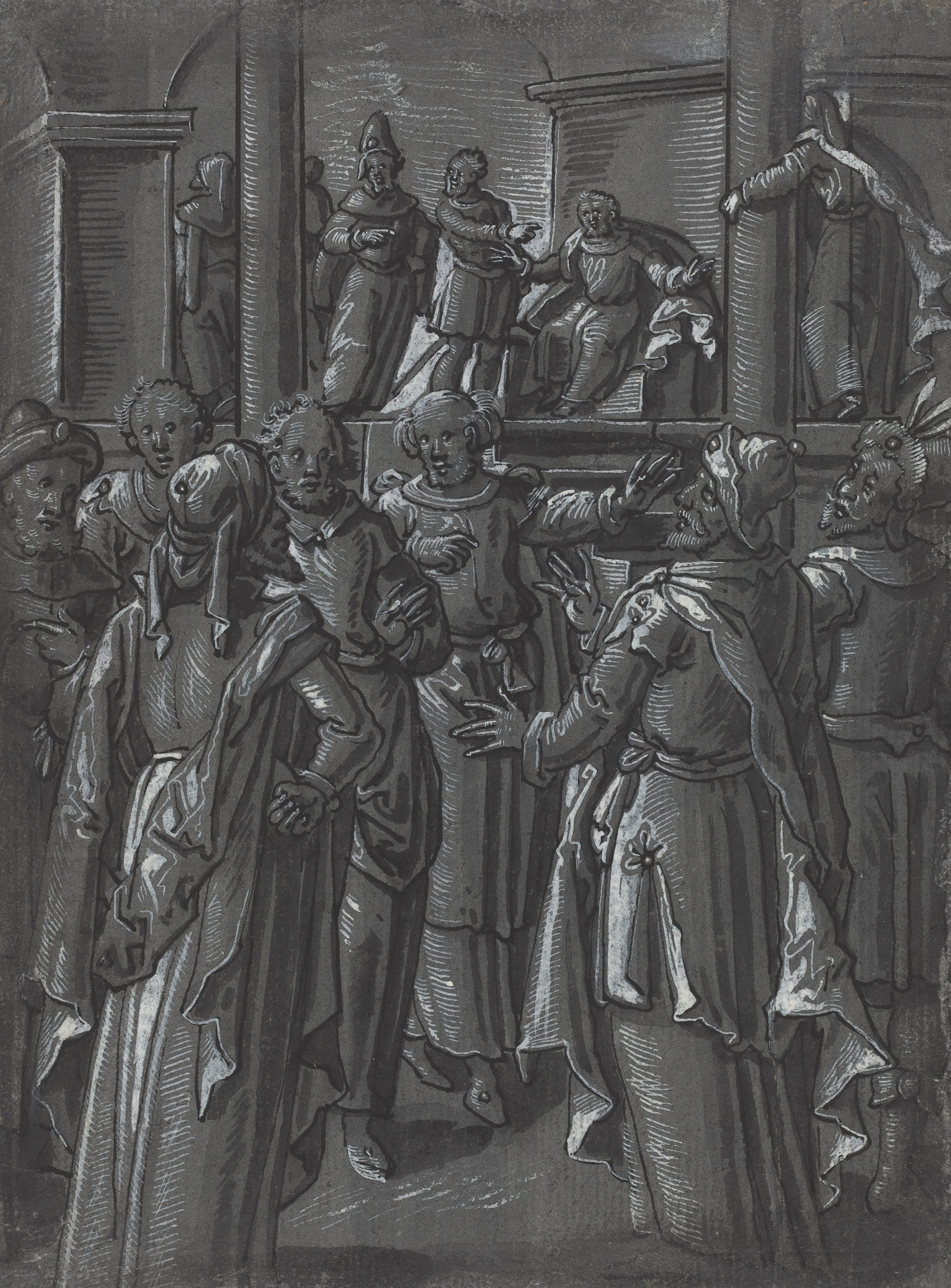
- "The High Priest before Pilate". German 16th Century.
- Book: Gospel of Matthew
- Christian Bible part: New Testament

Matthew 27:64 is the sixty-fourth verse of the twenty-seventh chapter of the Gospel of Matthew in the New Testament. This verse occurs after the crucifixion and entombment of Jesus. In it the chief priests and the Pharisees, who are meeting with Pontius Pilate, ask for a guard for the tomb.

== Content ==
The original Koine Greek, according to Westcott and Hort, reads:

κελευσον ουν ασφαλισθηναι τον ταφον εως της τριτης ημερας μηποτε
ελθοντες οι μαθηται κλεψωσιν αυτον και ειπωσιν τω λαω ηγερθη απο
των νεκρων και εσται η εσχατη πλανη χειρων της πρωτης

In the King James Version of the Bible it is translated as:

Command therefore that the sepulchre be made sure until the third day, lest his
disciples come by night, and steal him away, and say unto the people, He is
risen from the dead: so the last error shall be worse than the first.

The modern World English Bible translates the passage as:

Command therefore that the tomb be made secure until the third day, lest perhaps
his disciples come at night and steal him away, and tell the people, 'He is
risen from the dead'; and the last deception will be worse than the first."

For a collection of other versions see BibleHub Matthew 27:64.

== Analysis ==
At the time when Matthew's Gospel was being written, it appears that a story was current among anti-Christians that instead of being resurrected, Jesus' body had been stolen by the disciples. These verses are considered an attempt by the author of Matthew to counter these rumours. These scenes are not found in any of the other gospels. Grave robbery was a common problem in this era, lending some background to the charge.

The "last deception" seems to clearly be a reference to Jesus rising from the dead. What is mean by the "first deception" is not made clear. Theologian Daniel J. Harrington suggests it was probably Jesus' claim to be the King of the Jews. The talk of deception ironically foreshadows the actions of the priests at Matthew 28:12-13, where they bribe the guards to lie about the resurrection.

Preceded by Matthew 27:63	Gospel of Matthew; Chapter 27	Succeeded by Matthew 27:65
