= John 20:18 =

- ← 20:17 20:19 →
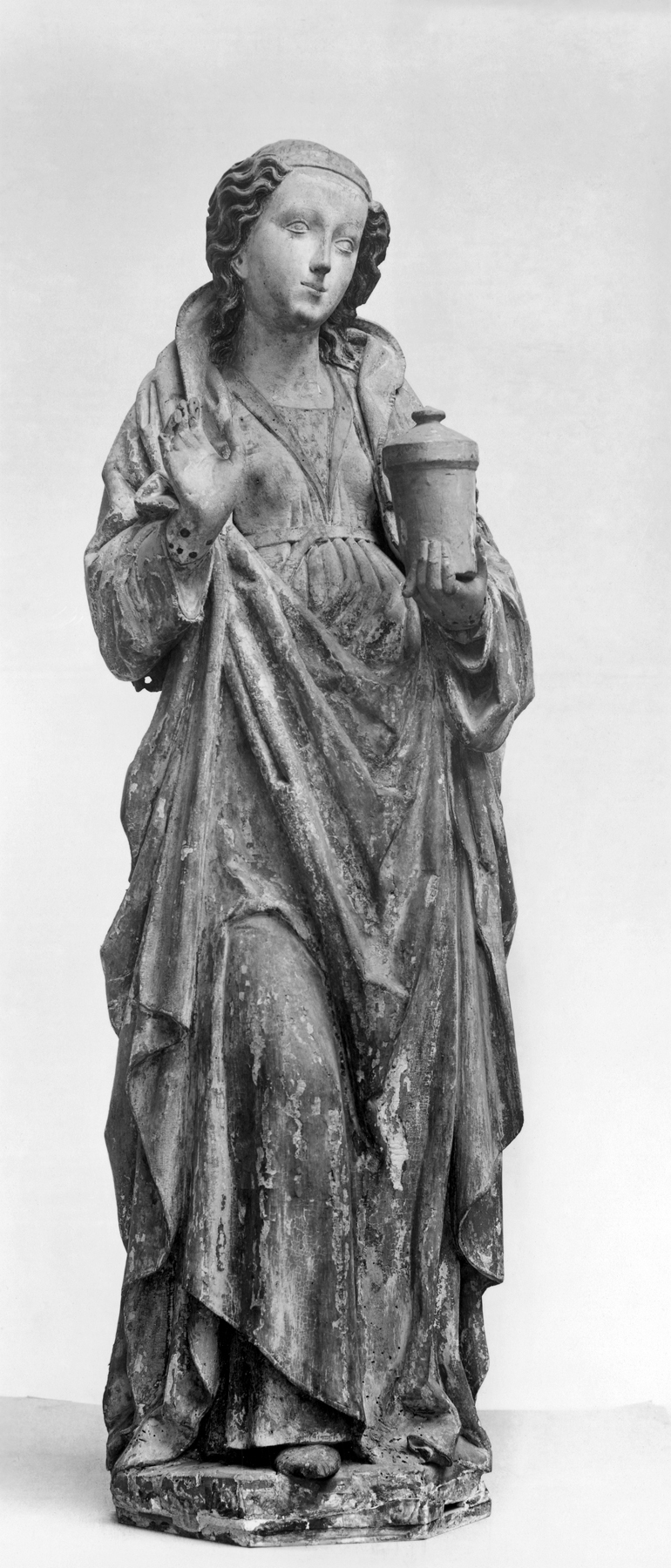
- A carved wooden statue of Saint Mary Magdalene holding an ointment jar, taken aback at finding the tomb empty (c. 1480-1530, late Gothic-Northern Renaissance)
- Book: Gospel of John
- Christian Bible part: New Testament

John 20:18 is the eighteenth verse of the twentieth chapter of the Gospel of John in the New Testament. It occurs after Jesus' resurrection and appearance to Mary Magdalene. In the previous verse, Jesus has given Mary a message to deliver to his disciples: this verse describes how she delivers it.

== Content ==
The original Koine Greek, according to the Textus Receptus, reads:

ἔρχεται Μαρία ἡ Μαγδαληνὴ ἀπαγγέλλουσα τοῖς μαθηταῖς ὅτι ἑώρακεν τὸν κύριον καὶ ταῦτα εἶπεν αὐτῇ.

In the King James Version of the Bible, this verse is translated as:

Mary Magdalene came and told the disciples that she had seen the Lord, and that he had spoken these things unto her.

The modern World English Bible translates the verse as:

Mary Magdalene came and told the disciples that she had seen the Lord, and that he had said these things to her.

For a collection of other versions see BibleHub John 20:18.

== Analysis ==
The account given in the Gospel of John differs from those in the Gospels of Matthew, Mark, and Luke, although all four describe the meeting between Mary and the disciples, and mention other appearances by Jesus. In Mark 16:7 and Matthew 28:7 the angel(s) give the women the task to inform the disciples concerning Jesus' later appearance in Galilee, whereas in Luke 24:33 the two disciples from Emmaus return to Jerusalem to inform the eleven. In John, Mary Magdalene is the one reporting both her meeting with Jesus and his message. That it was Mary who was sent to tell the disciples of the resurrection is considered by some scholars to reflect the central importance of Mary, leading Saint Augustine, for instance, to call Mary the "Apostle to the Apostles", and the Orthodox tradition to embrace this name for her. Saint Gregory sees her role here as a reversal of Eve's role in the fall: "a woman delivers the message of Him who raises us from the dead, as a woman had delivered the words of a serpent who slew us".

When reporting her experience, Mary was more concerned about her meeting with Jesus than with the message regarding his ascension.

John does not record how the disciples responded to Mary's message. Donald Carson suggests that their reaction may not have been any better than when they heard the women's report about the empty tomb (Luke 24:9–11).

== Sources ==
- Guthrie, Donald (1994). "John". In Carson, D. A.; France, R. T.; Motyer, J. A.; Wenham, G. J. (eds.). New Bible Commentary: 21st Century Edition (4, illustrated, reprint, revised ed.). Inter-Varsity Press. pp. 1021–1065. ISBN 9780851106489.
- Kieffer, René (2007). "60. John". In Barton, John; Muddiman, John (eds.). The Oxford Bible Commentary (first (paperback) ed.). Oxford University Press. pp. 960–1000. ISBN 978-0199277186.

Preceded by John 20:17	Gospel of John; Chapter 20	Succeeded by John 20:19
