= John 20:13 =

- ← 20:12 20:14 →
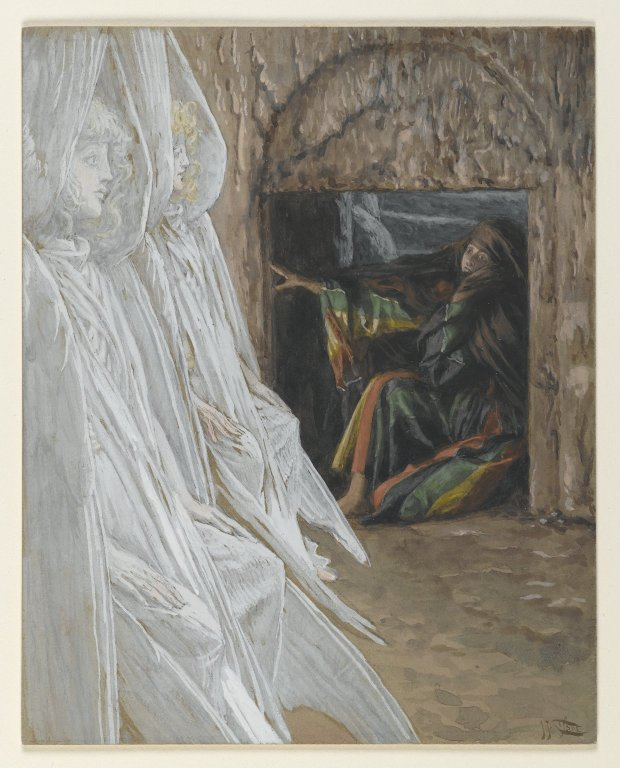
- Mary Magdalene Questions the Angels in the Tomb by James Tissot, c. 1890
- Book: Gospel of John
- Christian Bible part: New Testament

John 20:13 is the thirteenth verse of the twentieth chapter of the Gospel of John in the New Testament of the Christian Bible. This verse occurs after Mary Magdalene has found Jesus' tomb empty and has seen there two angels. In this verse, the angels ask Mary why she is crying.

== Content ==
The King James Version of this text reads:

And they say unto her, Woman, why weepest thou? She saith unto them, Because they have taken away my Lord, and I know not where they have laid him.

For a collection of other versions see BibleHub John 20:13.

== Analysis ==
The role of the angels presented in the Gospel of John during the resurrection narrative is far less developed than in the synoptic gospels, with John placing much of the weight on the subsequent encounter between Mary and the risen Jesus. See Mary Magdalene#Resurrection of Jesus for more details.

The word woman in this verse is a translation of the Greek word γυναι (gunai). This term was the polite way to address an adult female, and is in no way lacking in reverence despite how the word might sound to modern ears. In John 2:4, for instance, Jesus uses this same word to address his mother. John Chrysostom comments that the angels first address Mary "compassionately", "to prevent her from being overpowered by a spectacle of such extraordinary brightness". He adds that "Why weepest thou" is less a question, more an invitation: "Weep not".

== In art ==
The contrast between Mary's bewilderment in this episode and the dramatic change that takes place immediately thereafter is also reflected in the iconography of the corresponding scenes. The depiction of Mary's confusion in her encounter with the angels is often attributed to Matthew 28:13, where the guards at the tomb are paid to say that the body had been stolen. The somewhat bleak iconography of this scene is then often contrasted with the brilliant lights that shine from a resurrected Jesus after he has been recognized.

== See also ==
- Noli me tangere

Preceded by John 20:12	Gospel of John; Chapter 20	Succeeded by John 20:14
