= John 20:19 =

- ← 20:18 20:20 →
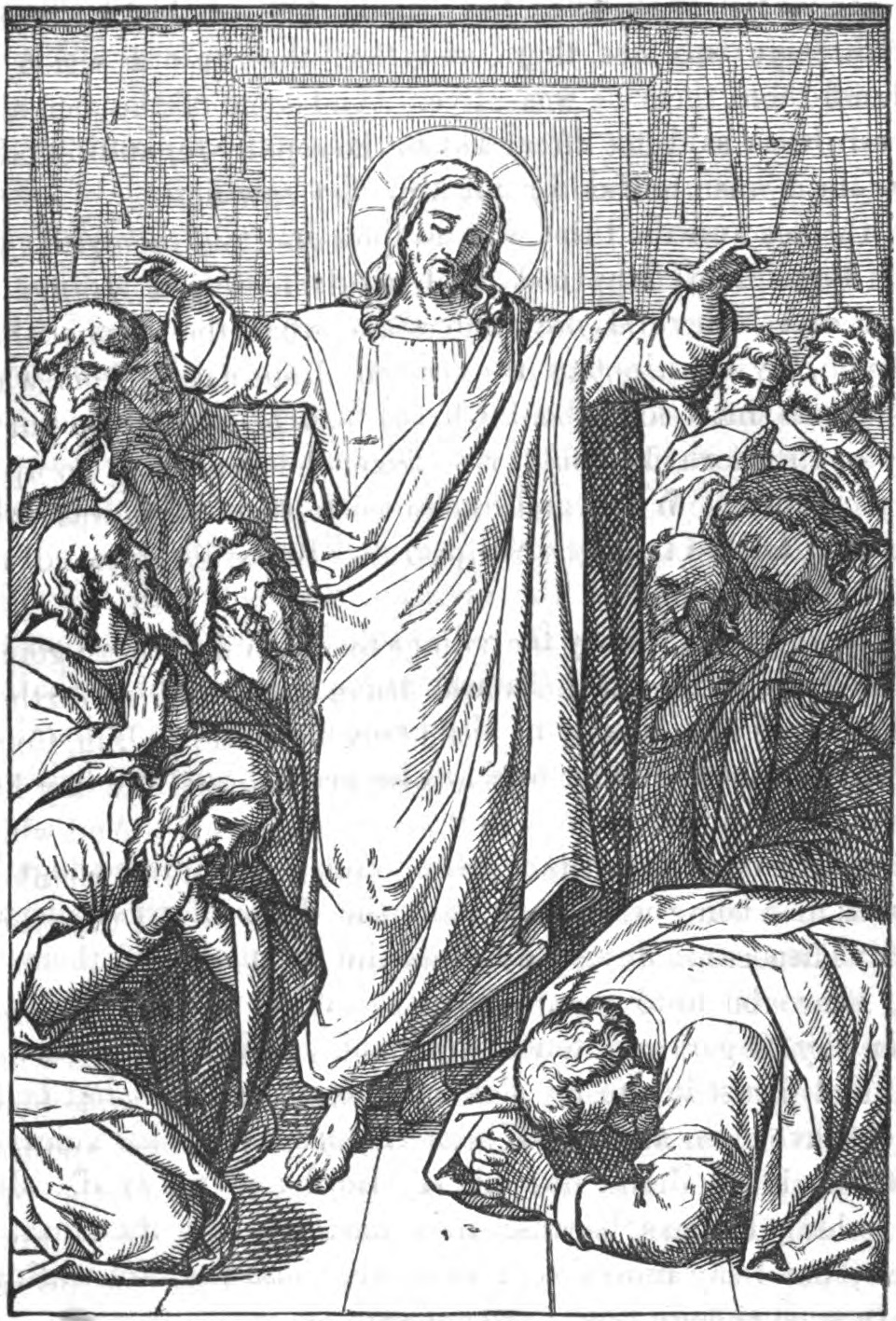
- Jesus appears to his disciples after he has risen. In The story of the Bible from Genesis to Revelation (1873).
- Book: Gospel of John
- Christian Bible part: New Testament

John 20:19 is the nineteenth verse of the twentieth chapter of the Gospel of John in the New Testament. It recounts the appearance of the risen Jesus among his disciples in a locked room of a house.

== Content ==
The original Koine Greek, according to the Textus Receptus, reads:

Οὔσης οὖν ὀψίας τῇ ἡμέρᾳ ἐκείνῃ τῇ μιᾷ τῶν σαββάτων καὶ τῶν θυρῶν κεκλεισμένων ὅπου ἦσαν οἱ μαθηταὶ συνηγμένοι διὰ τὸν φόβον τῶν Ἰουδαίων ἦλθεν ὁ Ἰησοῦς καὶ ἔστη εἰς τὸ μέσον καὶ λέγει αὐτοῖς Εἰρήνη ὑμῖν.

In the King James Version of the Bible, this verse is translated as:

Then the same day at evening, being the first day of the week, when the doors were shut where the disciples were assembled for fear of the Jews, came Jesus and stood in the midst, and saith unto them, Peace be unto you. (Note: The italicized words in this translation have been added to help make the meaning clear, and do not correspond to specific words in the original Greek text.)

The modern World English Bible translates the passage as:

When therefore it was evening, on that day, the first day of the week, and when the doors were locked where the disciples were assembled, for fear of the Jews, Jesus came and stood in the midst, and said to them, "Peace be to you." (Note: For a collection of other versions see BibleHub John 20:19.)

== Analysis ==
The account of Jesus' appearance in "the house where the disciples had gathered" (John 20:19–23) is similar to the account in the Gospel of Luke (Luke 24:36–49), when Jesus appeared to his disciples in Jerusalem (after the return of two of his followers who met Jesus on the road to Emmaus) on the evening of the day of his resurrection.

Only John mentions that the door was locked, along with the stated reason in the text: διὰ τὸν φόβον τῶν Ἰουδαίων ("for fear of the Jews"). In the Gospel of John, the phrase "the Jews" (οἱ Ἰουδαῖοι) typically refers to the Judean authorities or leaders who opposed Jesus, rather than Jewish people in general (a usage seen throughout the Gospel, e.g., in contexts of synagogue expulsion or hostility from Jerusalem-based leaders). (Note: See, for example, the commentaries by D.A. Carson, Andreas Köstenberger,) and Francis J. Moloney, who describe "the Jews" in John as primarily the authorities in conflict with Jesus and his followers; cf. Raymond E. Brown on contextual interpretation.) This reflects the disciples' concern over potential persecution or arrest by those authorities following Jesus' crucifixion. The "function" of the locked door is to show the "miraculous nature of Jesus' appearance", showing that the risen Jesus is "no longer bound by normal space conditions". For Bede, the evening represented the time when the disciples would have been "most afraid". The words Peace be with you (Ancient Greek: Εἰρήνη ὑμῖν, Eirēnē hymin) is a common traditional Jewish greeting (shalom alekem, or שלום לכם shalom lekom; cf. 1 Samuel 25:6) still in use today; repeated in verses 21 and 26), but here Jesus conveys the peace he had previously promised to his disciples (John 14:27; 16:33), causing the rapid switch of their emotion from "fear" (verse 19) to "joy" (verse 20).

The number of the disciples present is not certain, although Thomas' absence is singled out in verse 24, and Judas Iscariot would not have been present. It is possible that some other disciples, less tightly connected to the group, could have been there.

== Usage ==
The passage from John 20:19 to the end of the chapter provides the gospel reading for the Sunday after Easter in all three years of the liturgical cycle in the Revised Common Lectionary.

== Sources ==
- Guthrie, Donald (1994). "John". In Carson, D. A.; France, R. T.; Motyer, J. A.; Wenham, G. J. (eds.). New Bible Commentary: 21st Century Edition (4, illustrated, reprint, revised ed.). Inter-Varsity Press. pp. 1021–1065. ISBN 9780851106489.
- Kieffer, René (2007). "60. John". In Barton, John; Muddiman, John (eds.). The Oxford Bible Commentary (first (paperback) ed.). Oxford University Press. pp. 960–1000. ISBN 978-0199277186.

Preceded by John 20:18	Gospel of John; Chapter 20	Succeeded by John 20:20
