= John 20:20 =

- ← 20:19 20:21 →
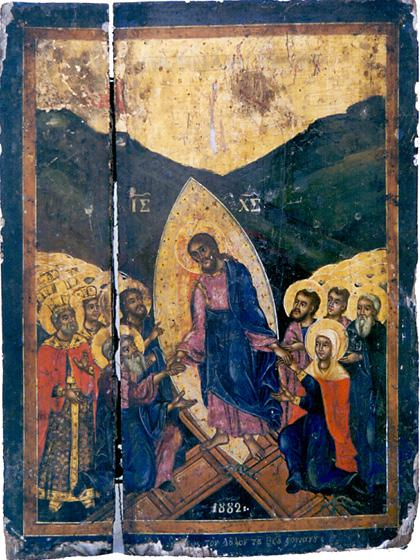
- Resurrection of Jesus. Icon from Saint Paraskevi Church in Langadas (1882).
- Book: Gospel of John
- Christian Bible part: New Testament

John 20:20 is the twentieth verse of the twentieth chapter of the Gospel of John in the New Testament. The risen Jesus shows his hands and his side to his disciples.

== Content ==
The original Koine Greek, according to the Textus Receptus, reads:

καὶ τοῦτο εἰπὼν ἔδειξεν αὐτοῖς τὰς χεῖρας καὶ τὴν πλευρὰν αὐτοῦ ἐχάρησαν οὖν οἱ μαθηταὶ ἰδόντες τὸν κύριον.

In the King James Version of the Bible this verse is translated as:

And when he had so said, he shewed unto them his hands and his side. Then were the disciples glad, when they saw the Lord.

The modern World English Bible translates the passage as:

When he had said this, he showed them his hands and his side. The disciples therefore were glad when they saw the Lord.

For a collection of other versions see BibleHub John 20:20.

== Textual witnesses ==
Some early manuscripts containing the text of this verse in Greek are:

- Papyrus 5 (c. 250)
- Codex Vaticanus (AD 325–350)
- Codex Sinaiticus (330-360)
- Codex Bezae (c. 400)
- Codex Alexandrinus (400-440)

== Analysis ==
The account of Jesus' appearance in "the house where the disciples had gathered" (John 20:19–23) is similar to the account in the Gospel of Luke (Luke 24:36–49), when Jesus appeared to his disciples in Jerusalem (after the return of two of his followers who met Jesus on the road to Emmaus) on the evening of the day of his resurrection.

"His hands and his side" identify the marks of Jesus' crucifixion and the piercing of his body after he had died. Luke 24:39 refers to his hands and feet. From these marks, the disciples were able to "see the Lord", and from this identification, together with the greeting, "peace be to you", their emotions rapidly switched from "fear" (verse 19) to "joy"/"gladness" (verse 20).

== Sources ==
- Guthrie, Donald (1994). "John". In Carson, D. A.; France, R. T.; Motyer, J. A.; Wenham, G. J. (eds.). New Bible Commentary: 21st Century Edition (4, illustrated, reprint, revised ed.). Inter-Varsity Press. pp. 1021–1065. ISBN 9780851106489.
- Kieffer, René (2007). "60. John". In Barton, John; Muddiman, John (eds.). The Oxford Bible Commentary (first (paperback) ed.). Oxford University Press. pp. 960–1000. ISBN 978-0199277186.

Preceded by John 20:19	Gospel of John; Chapter 20	Succeeded by John 20:21
