= John 20:22 =

- ← 20:21 20:23 →
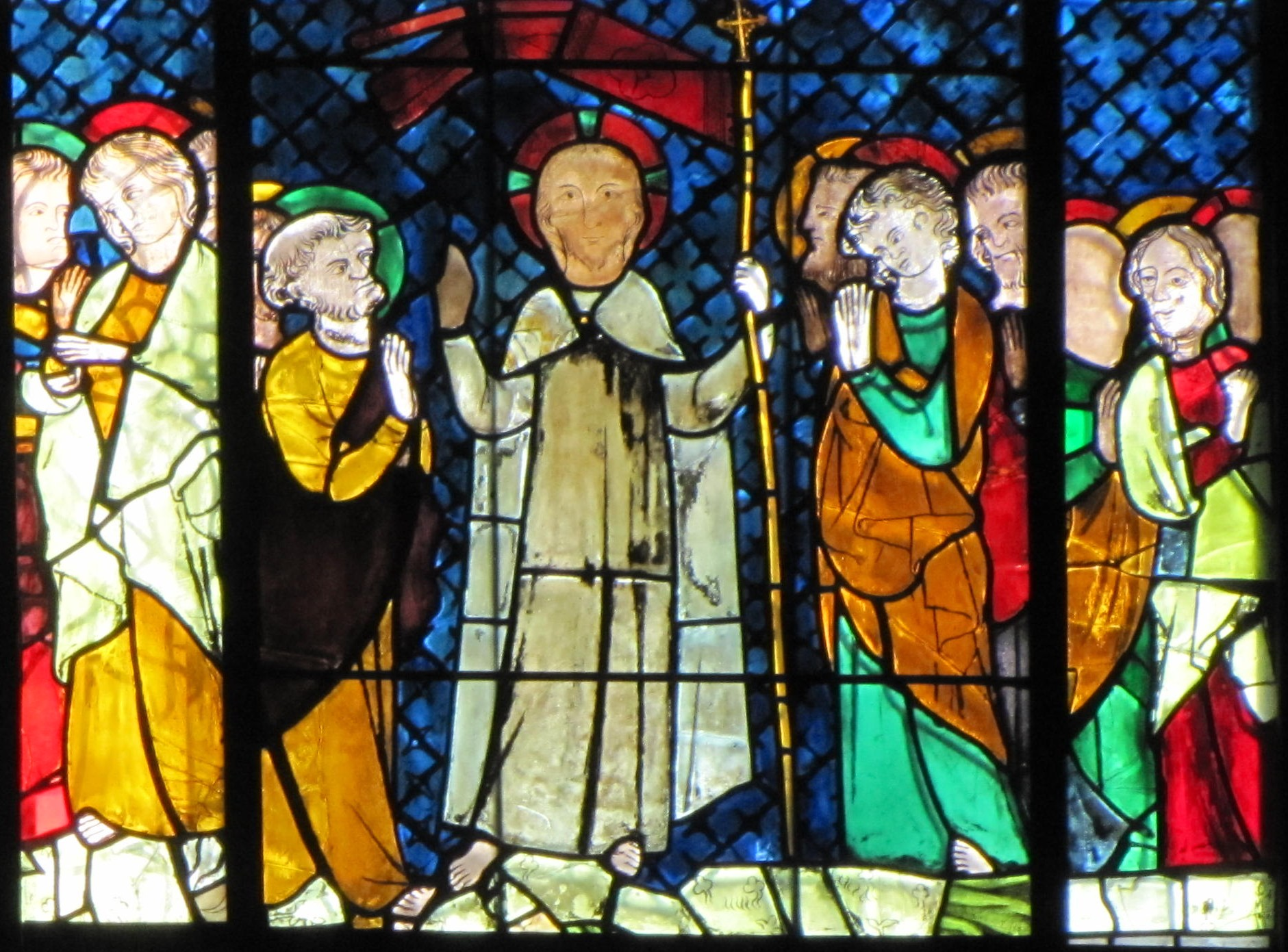
- "Resurrection of Christ": Jesus appears to his disciples. Cathédrale Notre-Dame de Strasbourg.
- Book: Gospel of John
- Christian Bible part: New Testament

John 20:22 is the twenty-second verse of the twentieth chapter of the Gospel of John in the New Testament. It records Jesus giving the Holy Spirit to the disciples during his first appearance after the resurrection.

== Content ==
The original Koine Greek, according to the Textus Receptus, reads:

καὶ τοῦτο εἰπὼν ἐνεφύσησεν καὶ λέγει αὐτοῖς Λάβετε πνεῦμα ἅγιον·

In the King James Version of the Bible this verse is translated as:

And when he had said this, he breathed on them, and saith unto them, Receive ye the Holy Ghost:

The modern World English Bible (WEB) translates the passage as:

When he had said this, he breathed on them, and said to them, "Receive the Holy Spirit!"

For a collection of other versions see BibleHub John 20:22.

== Analysis ==
The account of Jesus' first post-resurrection appearance to the disciples in the Gospel of John (20:19-23) shows similarity to the account in the Gospel of Luke (24:36–49), in that it happened in Jerusalem in the evening of his resurrection from the dead.

"He breathed on them" is from one Greek word ἐνεφύσησεν, enephysēsen, recalling Genesis 2:7:

And the Lord God formed man of the dust of the ground, and breathed into his nostrils the breath of life; and man became a living being.

The command, "receive the Holy Spirit", serves to equip the disciples for their missionary work, which is dependent on the mission of the Son, as stated in verse 21. Readings differ as to whether the words refer to "the present actual reception of the Holy Spirit, or a promise of its future reception. Heinrich Meyer (1880) identified several theologians representative of both points of view. Andreas Köstenberger suggests that this represents a symbolic promise anticipating the gift of the Spirit fifty days later at Pentecost (Acts 2). John Calvin notes that here the disciples were sprinkled with the grace of the Spirit, but not yet saturated with the full enduement of power until Acts 2. and similarly theologian Henry Alford warns that

To understand this verse as the outpouring of the Spirit [and] the fulfilment of the promise of the Comforter, is against all consistency, and most against John himself: see John 16:7 and John 7:39. To understand it rightly, we have merely to recur to that great key to the meaning of so many dark passages of Scripture, the manifold and gradual unfolding of promise and prophecy in their fulfilment. The presence of the Lord among them now was a slight and temporary fulfilment of His promise of returning to them; and so the imparting of the Spirit now was a symbol and foretaste of that which they should receive at Pentecost: just as, to mount a step higher, that itself, in its present abiding with us, is but the first-fruits and pledge (Romans 8:23, 2 Corinthians 1:22) of the fulness which we shall hereafter inherit.

The giving of the Spirit at this time was linked with the forgiving on sins (see verse 23).

== Sources ==
- Guthrie, Donald (1994). "John". In Carson, D. A.; France, R. T.; Motyer, J. A.; Wenham, G. J. (eds.). New Bible Commentary: 21st Century Edition (4, illustrated, reprint, revised ed.). Inter-Varsity Press. pp. 1021–1065. ISBN 9780851106489.
- Kieffer, René (2007). "60. John". In Barton, John; Muddiman, John (eds.). The Oxford Bible Commentary (first (paperback) ed.). Oxford University Press. pp. 960–1000. ISBN 978-0199277186.

Preceded by John 20:21	Gospel of John; Chapter 20	Succeeded by John 20:23
