= John 20:27 =

- ← 20:26 20:28 →
- The Incredulity of Saint Thomas. Painting by Caravaggio (1571–1610)
- Book: Gospel of John
- Christian Bible part: New Testament

John 20:27 is the twenty-seventh verse of the twentieth chapter of the Gospel of John in the New Testament. It records Jesus' reappearance to the disciples, including Thomas, eight days after his resurrection.

== Content ==
The original Koine Greek, according to the Textus Receptus, reads:

εἶτα λέγει τῷ Θωμᾷ Φέρε τὸν δάκτυλόν σου ὧδε καὶ ἴδε τὰς χεῖράς μου καὶ φέρε τὴν χεῖρά σου καὶ βάλε εἰς τὴν πλευράν μου καὶ μὴ γίνου ἄπιστος ἀλλὰ πιστός

In the King James Version of the Bible, this verse is translated as:

Then saith he to Thomas, Reach hither thy finger, and behold my hands; and reach hither thy hand, and thrust it into my side: and be not faithless, but believing.

The modern World English Bible (WEB) translates the passage as:

Then he said to Thomas, "Reach here your finger, and see my hands. Reach here your hand, and put it into my side. Don't be unbelieving, but believing."

For a collection of other versions see BibleHub John 20:27.

== Analysis ==
Immediately after his greeting, "Peace", (John 20:26), Jesus directed his attention to "the main church problem at hand: Thomas's doubt". Jesus granted Thomas's demands to verify the marks of his crucifixion: the marks of the nails in Jesus' hands and the pierced hole on his side (John 19:34). According to Frederick Dale Bruner, it must surely have shocked Thomas that Jesus knew exactly his problem, as every point of his requirements for physical verification (John 20:25) was met and Jesus had spoken back to him with uncanny precision. Gottfreid Lücke raises the possibility that the other disciples had told Jesus about Thomas's doubts.

The repetition of his wording, and the sympathy shown to his misgivings, must have left a deep impression on Thomas, leading to the response in John 20:28, "My Lord and my God".

== Sources ==
- Guthrie, Donald (1994). "John". In Carson, D. A.; France, R. T.; Motyer, J. A.; Wenham, G. J. (eds.). New Bible Commentary: 21st Century Edition (4, illustrated, reprint, revised ed.). Inter-Varsity Press. pp. 1021–1065. ISBN 9780851106489.
- Kieffer, René (2007). "60. John". In Barton, John; Muddiman, John (eds.). The Oxford Bible Commentary (first (paperback) ed.). Oxford University Press. pp. 960–1000. ISBN 978-0199277186.

Preceded by John 20:26	Gospel of John; Chapter 20	Succeeded by John 20:28
