= John 20:29 =

- ← 20:28 20:30 →
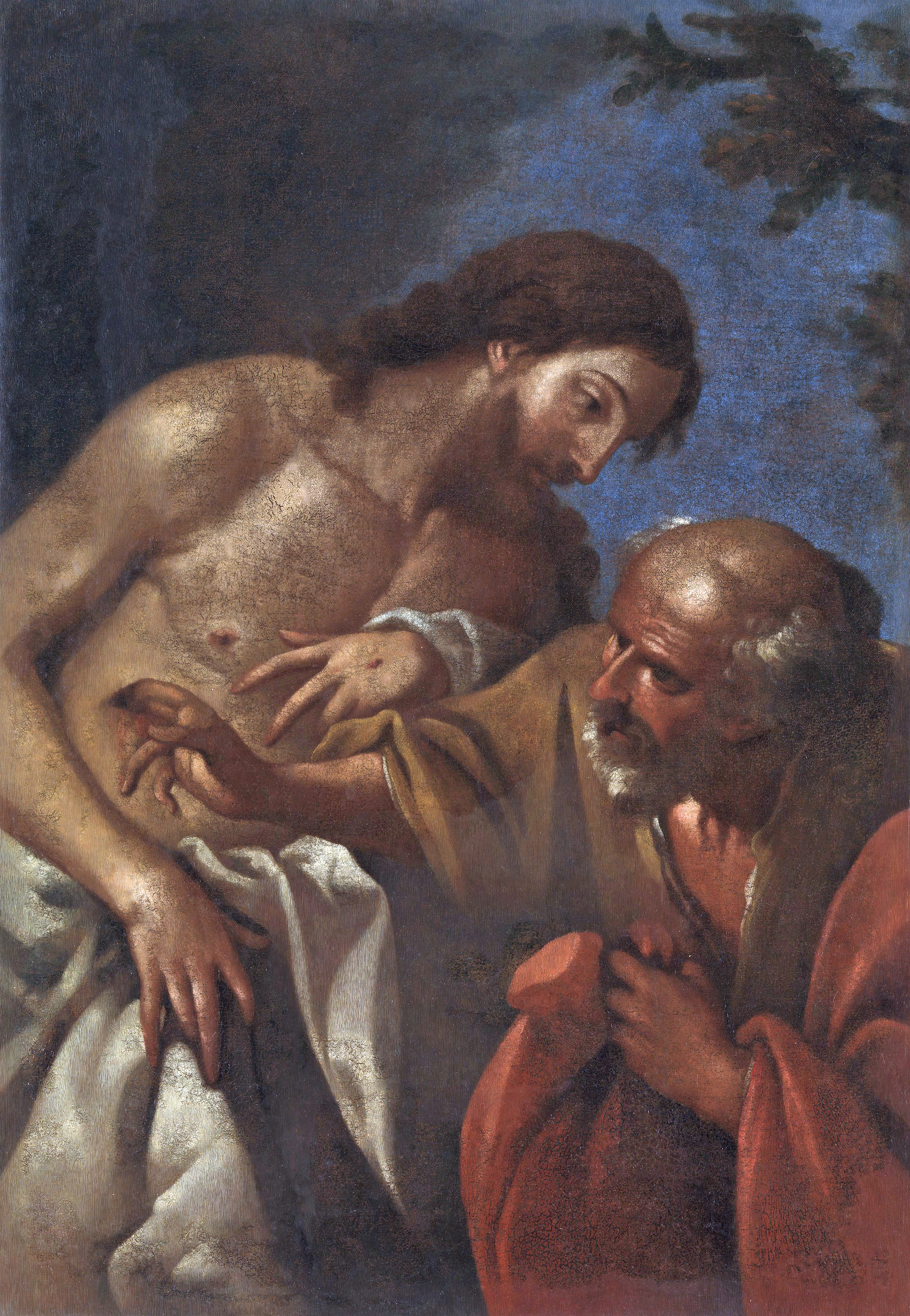
- Incredulity of Saint Thomas. Painting by Circle of Titian (–1576)
- Book: Gospel of John
- Christian Bible part: New Testament

John 20:29 is the twenty-ninth verse of the twentieth chapter of the Gospel of John in the New Testament. It concludes the gospel's account of Jesus' reappearance to the disciples and his dialogue with Thomas, eight days after his resurrection.

== Content ==
The original Koine Greek, according to the Textus Receptus, reads:

λέγει αὐτῷ ὁ Ἰησοῦς Ὅτι ἑώρακάς με Θωμᾷ πεπίστευκας μακάριοι οἱ μὴ ἰδόντες καὶ πιστεύσαντες

In the King James Version of the Bible, this verse is translated as:

Jesus saith unto him, Thomas, because thou hast seen me, thou hast believed: blessed are they that have not seen, and yet have believed.

The modern World English Bible (WEB) translates the passage as:

Jesus said to him, "Because you have seen me, you have believed. Blessed are those who have not seen, and have believed."

Some translations express Jesus' words (verse 29a) as a question:

Jesus said to him, "Have you believed because you have seen me? Blessed are those who have not seen and yet have believed."

For a collection of other versions see BibleHub John 20:29.

== Analysis ==
One interpretation of this verse suggests that Thomas's confession in verse 28 has a significant weakness in that it depends on sight, so Jesus needs both the repetition of the words Thomas used a few days before (verse 25) and then an immediate correction (verse 29b), made in stating the "greater blessedness of those who believe without seeing".

With this statement, Jesus was not only reaching out to Thomas, but is reaching out to all future believers (cf. John 17:20–24) and embraces them all. The followers of Jesus since his ascension have relied on "secure evidence" (the scriptures, the witness of the church through the ages, and personal experiences in faith) without having actually seen Jesus. Those "who have not seen, and yet believe" become numerous from the beginning of the Acts of the Apostles.

Another interpretation is that Jesus was shaming Thomas for wanting evidence to show that the person claiming to be Jesus was in fact him, and teaching that faith, which is believing without evidence, is more valuable than believing with evidence. This interpretation is supported by the fact that the use of sight in order to establish an inference is very useful in this particular situation and was more supportive than simply hearing Jesus make his claim, since it is very unusual for someone to have risen from the dead.

The Eastern Orthodox Church views Thomas's initial doubt much less negatively, even praising it in the Vespers service on Thomas Sunday, stating, "O good unbelief of Thomas!"

This verse is often used to support the notion that the Bible teaches people to value faith over evidence and is why many Christians continue to shame Thomas for doubting, referring to him with the nickname "Doubting Thomas". In fact, this verse is often used by modern apologists to support the resurrection belief by stating that Thomas was "embarrassed" for doubting and thus wanting evidence for Jesus' claim. Their argument is that persons who were lying about the stories they were writing about would not include embarrassing details about themselves. Thus, they claim, the story is probably true because it contains such embarrassing details about the authors. If the interpretation was that Jesus was simply teaching that evidence could come from methods other than using sight, then Thomas doubting and wanting evidence would not be an embarrassing act, and that Jesus was merely using the situation as a learning experience to teach that evidence can come in other forms.

This verse and John 13:17 both use the term "blessed" (Greek: makarios). In the beatitudes (cf. Matthew 5:3-12) the term contains "a note of admonition".

This verse also concludes "the 'literary partnership' shared by Mary Magdalene and Thomas in John 20", where the narrative traces the faith journeys of both characters from misunderstanding and doubt to the acknowledgment of Jesus as the risen Lord in witnessing and confession.

== Sources ==
- Guthrie, Donald (1994). "John". In Carson, D. A.; France, R. T.; Motyer, J. A.; Wenham, G. J. (eds.). New Bible Commentary: 21st Century Edition (4, illustrated, reprint, revised ed.). Inter-Varsity Press. pp. 1021–1065. ISBN 9780851106489.
- Kieffer, René (2007). "60. John". In Barton, John; Muddiman, John (eds.). The Oxford Bible Commentary (first (paperback) ed.). Oxford University Press. pp. 960–1000. ISBN 978-0199277186.

Preceded by John 20:28	Gospel of John; Chapter 20	Succeeded by John 20:30
