= John 20:21 =

- ← 20:20 20:22 →
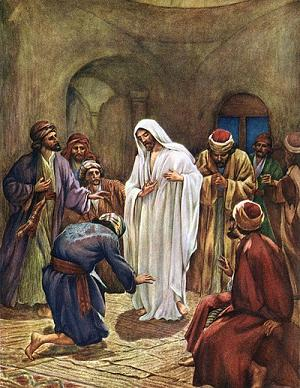
- Jesus appears to his disciples after he has risen. In "The life of Jesus of Nazareth: eighty pictures" (1906).
- Book: Gospel of John
- Christian Bible part: New Testament

John 20:21 is the twenty-first verse of the twentieth chapter of the Gospel of John in the New Testament. It records Jesus' commission to the disciples during his first appearance after the resurrection.

== Content ==
The original Koine Greek, according to the Textus Receptus, reads:

εἶπεν οὖν αὐτοῖς ὁ Ἰησοῦς πάλιν Εἰρήνη ὑμῖν· καθὼς ἀπέσταλκέν με ὁ πατήρ κἀγὼ πέμπω ὑμᾶς·

In the King James Version of the Bible, this verse is translated as:

Then said Jesus to them again, Peace be unto you: as my Father hath sent me, even so send I you.

The modern World English Bible (WEB) translates the passage as:

Jesus therefore said to them again, "Peace be to you. As the Father has sent me, even so I send you."

For a collection of other versions see BibleHub John 20:21.

== Analysis ==
The account of Jesus' appearance in "the house where the disciples had gathered" (John 20:19–23) is similar to the account in the Gospel of Luke (Luke 24:36–49), when Jesus appeared to his disciples in Jerusalem (after the return of two of his followers who met Jesus on the road to Emmaus) on the evening of the day of his resurrection.

The greeting Peace be with you (Ancient Greek: Εἰρήνη ὑμῖν, Eirēnē hymin) is a common traditional Jewish greeting still in use today (shalom alekem or שלום לכם shalom lekom; cf. 1 Samuel 25:6), also spoken by Jesus in John 20:19 and 26.

The statement "as the Father has sent me, even so I send you" indicates that the missionary work of the disciples is dependent on the mission of Jesus, the Son of God. The repetition of the words of peace gives the emphasis on the importance of this commission. Each gospel records a commission from Jesus after resurrection. Heinrich Meyer argues that the commission was Jesus' intended plan, "which He had in view in this His appearance".

== Sources ==
- Guthrie, Donald (1994). "John". In Carson, D. A.; France, R. T.; Motyer, J. A.; Wenham, G. J. (eds.). New Bible Commentary: 21st Century Edition (4, illustrated, reprint, revised ed.). Inter-Varsity Press. pp. 1021–1065. ISBN 9780851106489.
- Kieffer, René (2007). "60. John". In Barton, John; Muddiman, John (eds.). The Oxford Bible Commentary (first (paperback) ed.). Oxford University Press. pp. 960–1000. ISBN 978-0199277186.

Preceded by John 20:20	Gospel of John; Chapter 20	Succeeded by John 20:22
