= John 20:28 =

- ← 20:27 20:29 →
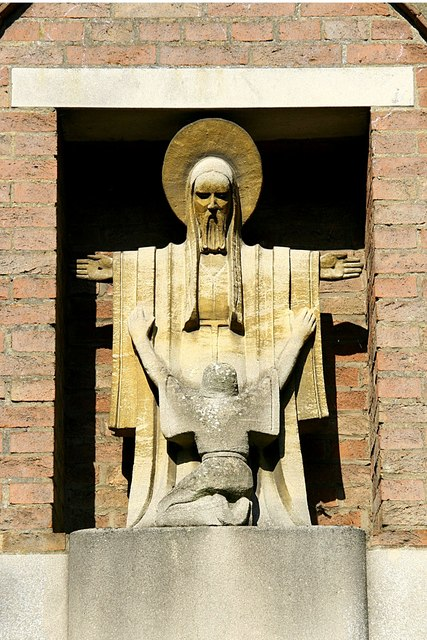
- Portland Stone carving showing St.Thomas kneeling to the risen Christ, by Philip Pape in 1956. St.Thomas' Church, Skirbeck, Lincolnshire.
- Book: Gospel of John
- Christian Bible part: New Testament

John 20:28 is the twenty-eighth verse of the twentieth chapter of the Gospel of John in the New Testament, in which the apostle Thomas declares his recognition of "My Lord and my God".

== Context ==
This short verse forms part of the Gospel's account of Jesus's reappearance to the disciples, including Thomas, eight days after his resurrection. In the previous verse, Jesus has invited Thomas to see and touch the wounds of his crucified body, and to believe.

== Content ==
The original Koine Greek, according to the Textus Receptus, reads:

καὶ ἀπεκρίθη ὁ Θωμᾶς, καὶ εἶπεν αὐτῷ, Ὁ Κύριός μου καὶ ὁ Θεός μου

The transliteration of the original Koine Greek to Latin script is:

kai apekrithē ho Thōmas, kai eipen autō, Ho Kyrios mou kai ho Theos mou.

In the King James Version of the Bible, this verse is translated as:

And Thomas answered and said unto him, My Lord and my God.

The modern World English Bible (WEB) translates the passage as:

Thomas answered him, "My Lord and my God!"

For a collection of other versions see BibleHub John 20:28.

== Analysis ==
In John 13:13–14, Jesus used the term 'teacher' and 'lord' as synonyms, but here 'my Lord' is designated to the risen Christ, and 'my God' resumes Jesus' description in the Prologue as 'God' (John 1:1, 18).

Suetonius records that the Roman emperor Domitian (AD 81–96) wished to be addressed as dominus et deus noster, "our Lord and God", so the statement in this verse "may on a secondary level be designed to counter Roman emperor worship".

The declension of the Greek words 'Lord' (Κύριός) and 'God' (Θεός) used in this verse is in the nominative case - the one that marks the subject of a verb. Greek, like Latin, has a vocative case for addressing someone directly. In the New Testament, the vocative case of the words 'Lord' (Κύριε) and 'God' (θεέ) is used 120 times and twice, respectively. Therefore, an argument could be made on syntactical grounds that Thomas's expression was an exclamation of astonishment spoken to Jesus but actually directed to God, and that John would have had to use the vocative case instead if Thomas's words were directed to Jesus. However there are many objections to this. Besides the explicit phrase “said to Him”, Murray J. Harris, for example, claims that we can find a lot of similar constructions, the closest of which is in the Psalm 34(35):23. He writes: “My suggestion regarding the genesis of Thomas's confession is this. In his attempt to depict the significance of the risen Jesus for himself personally, Thomas used a liturgical form ultimately drawn from the LXX, which later came to serve admirably as the crowning christological affirmation of the Fourth Gospel”.

Augustine of Hippo observes that Thomas "saw and touched the man, and confessed the God whom he neither saw nor touched".

== Sources ==
- Guthrie, Donald (1994). "John". In Carson, D. A.; France, R. T.; Motyer, J. A.; Wenham, G. J. (eds.). New Bible Commentary: 21st Century Edition (4, illustrated, reprint, revised ed.). Inter-Varsity Press. pp. 1021–1065. ISBN 9780851106489.
- Kieffer, René (2007). "60. John". In Barton, John; Muddiman, John (eds.). The Oxford Bible Commentary (first (paperback) ed.). Oxford University Press. pp. 960–1000. ISBN 978-0199277186.

Preceded by John 20:27	Gospel of John; Chapter 20	Succeeded by John 20:29
