= John 20:26 =

- ← 20:25 20:27 →
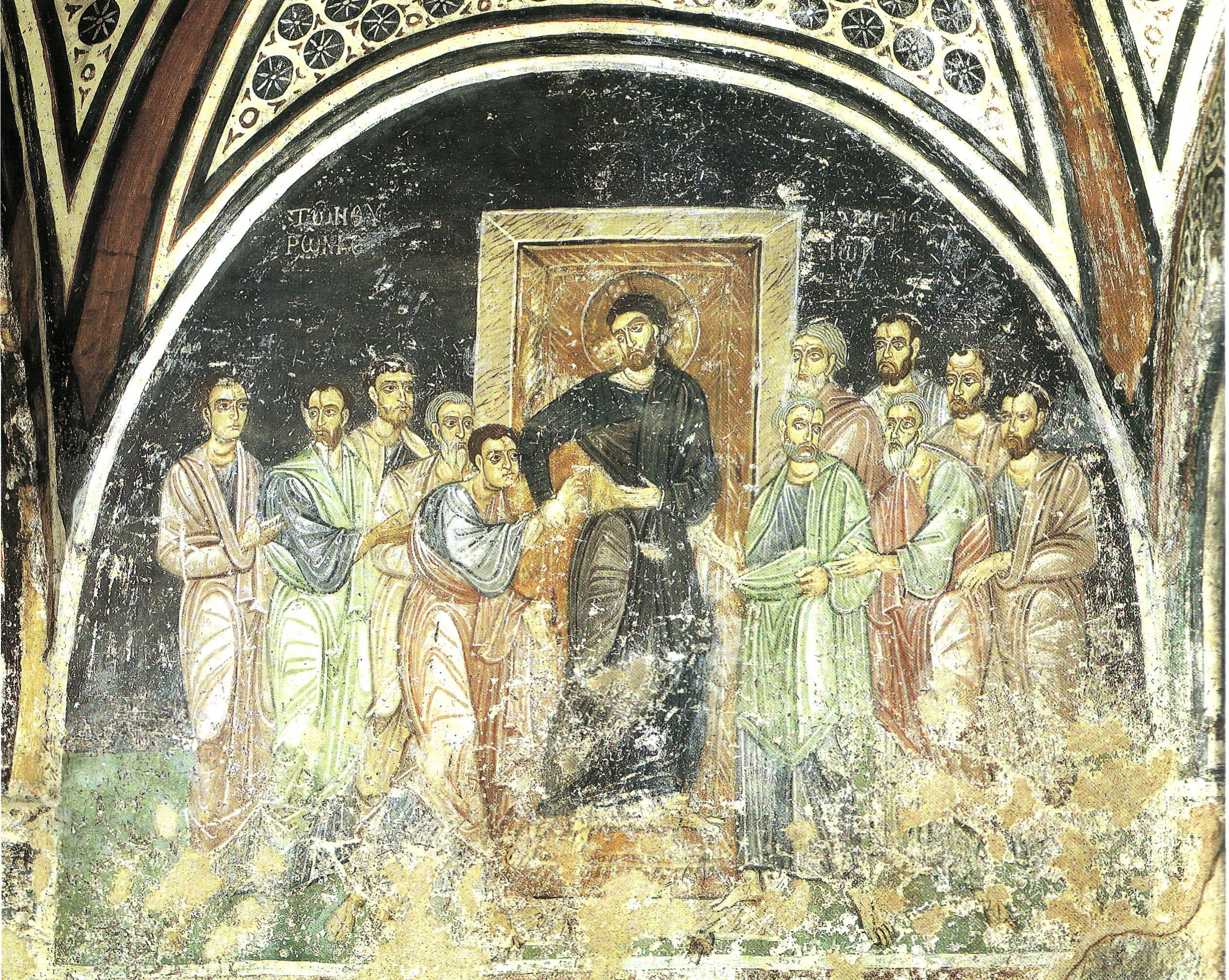
- Byzantine-era depiction of Doubting Thomas. Hosios Loukas Monastery, Boeotia, Greece.
- Book: Gospel of John
- Christian Bible part: New Testament

John 20:26 is the twenty-sixth verse of the twentieth chapter of the Gospel of John in the New Testament. It records Jesus' reappearance to the disciples, including Thomas, eight days after his resurrection.

== Content ==
The original Koine Greek, according to the Textus Receptus, reads:

Καὶ μεθ' ἡμέρας ὀκτὼ πάλιν ἦσαν ἔσω οἱ μαθηταὶ αὐτοῦ καὶ Θωμᾶς μετ' αὐτῶν ἔρχεται ὁ Ἰησοῦς τῶν θυρῶν κεκλεισμένων καὶ ἔστη εἰς τὸ μέσον καὶ εἶπεν Εἰρήνη ὑμῖν

In the King James Version of the Bible, this verse is translated as:

And after eight days again his disciples were within, and Thomas with them: then came Jesus, the doors being shut, and stood in the midst, and said, Peace be unto you.

The modern World English Bible (WEB) translates this verse as:

After eight days again his disciples were inside, and Thomas was with them. Jesus came, the doors being locked, and stood in the midst, and said, "Peace be to you."

For a collection of other versions see BibleHub John 20:26.

== Analysis ==
"After eight days" brings the chronology to the Sunday after Easter. This week may correspond to the cumulative first week recorded in John 1:19–2:1, and to the last week before his death in John 12:1–19:31, which begins "six days before the Passover".

The doors were again "closed" or "locked", (Note: Greek perfect verb: κεκλεισμένων, kekleismenōn) as they had been in John 20:19, because of the disciples' continued fear "of the Jews", but Jesus could enter and be in their midst. (Note: Broadly the English language versions which have the doors "locked" in verse 19 use the same term in verse 26, as do those who used the words "closed" or "shut".)

The phrase "Peace be with you" (Note: Ancient Greek: Εἰρήνη ὑμῖν, Eirēnē hymin) is a common traditional Jewish greeting, still in use today (shalom aleichem or שלום לכם shalom lekom: cf. 1 Samuel 25:6). The same words were spoken by Jesus in verse 19 and "again" in verse 21. Jesus' words of "peace" at this time can be seen as offering reassurance for the disciples.

== Sources ==
- Guthrie, Donald (1994). "John". In Carson, D. A.; France, R. T.; Motyer, J. A.; Wenham, G. J. (eds.). New Bible Commentary: 21st Century Edition (4, illustrated, reprint, revised ed.). Inter-Varsity Press. pp. 1021–1065. ISBN 9780851106489.
- Kieffer, René (2007). "60. John". In Barton, John; Muddiman, John (eds.). The Oxford Bible Commentary (first (paperback) ed.). Oxford University Press. pp. 960–1000. ISBN 978-0199277186.

| Preceded by John 20:25 | Gospel of John; Chapter 20 | Succeeded by John 20:27 |
