= John 20:30–31 =

- ← 20:29 21:1 →
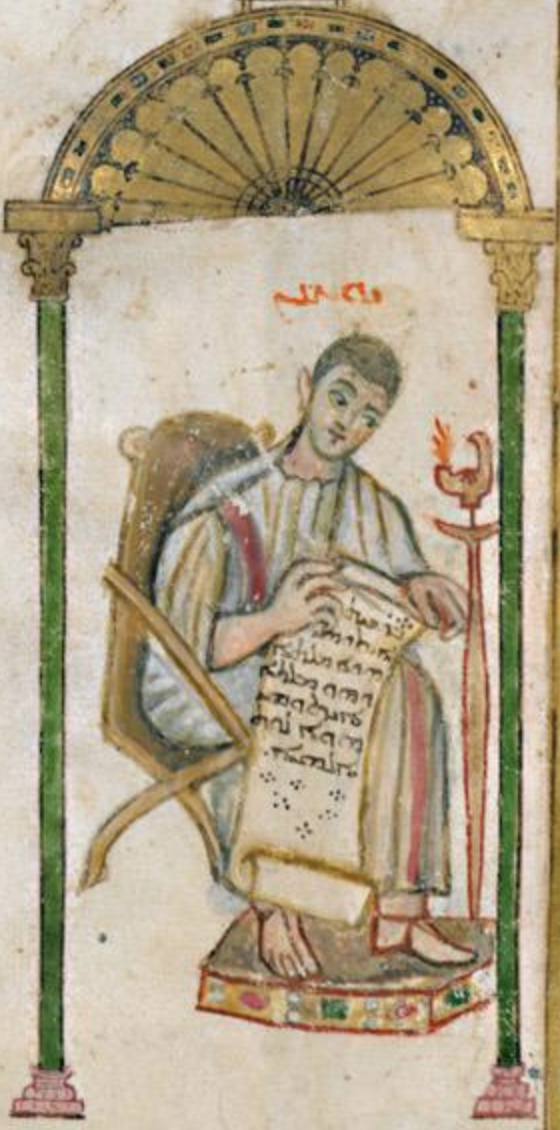
- A Syriac Christian rendition of St. John the Evangelist, from the Rabbula Gospels.
- Book: Gospel of John
- Christian Bible part: New Testament

John 20:30–31 are the final two verses of the twentieth chapter of the Gospel of John in the New Testament. They set out a statement of purpose for the whole gospel. The two verses, which suddenly moves from the account of Jesus' second appearance among his disciples to this summative statement, form a first epilogue to what the evangelist calls "this book".

== Content ==
The text in Koine Greek, according to the Textus Receptus, reads:

Πολλὰ μὲν οὖν καὶ ἄλλα σημεῖα ἐποίησεν ὁ Ἰησοῦς ἐνώπιον τῶν μαθητῶν αὐτοῦ ἃ οὐκ ἔστιν γεγραμμένα ἐν τῷ βιβλίῳ τούτῳ· ταῦτα δὲ γέγραπται ἵνα πιστεύσητε ὅτι ὁ Ἰησοῦς ἐστιν ὁ Χριστὸς ὁ υἱὸς τοῦ θεοῦ καὶ ἵνα πιστεύοντες ζωὴν ἔχητε ἐν τῷ ὀνόματι αὐτοῦ

In the King James Version of the Bible, these verses are translated as:

And many other signs truly did Jesus in the presence of his disciples, which are not written in this book: But these are written, that ye might believe that Jesus is the Christ, the Son of God; and that believing ye might have life through his name.

The modern World English Bible (WEB) translates the passage as:

Therefore Jesus did many other signs in the presence of his disciples, which are not written in this book; but these are written, that you may believe that Jesus is the Christ, the Son of God, and that believing you may have life in his name.

For a collection of other versions see BibleHub John 20:30 and BibleHub 31.

== Analysis ==
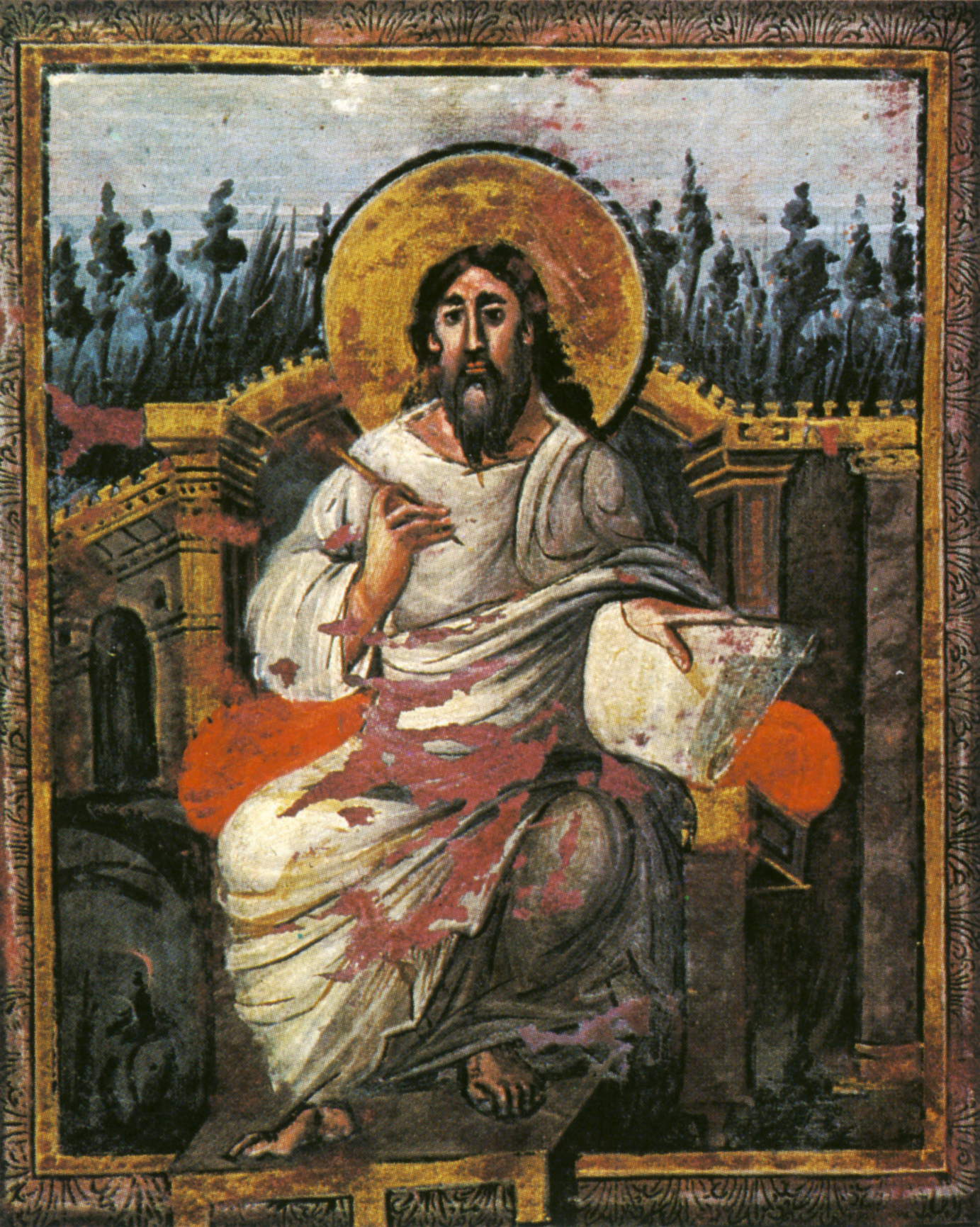
St. John, from the Coronation Gospels (late 8th century)

These two verses form a first epilogue to what the evangelist calls "this book". René Kieffer notes how suddenly the text moves from the account of Jesus' second appearance among his disciples to this summative statement. The record in this gospel is clearly selective and directed towards a specific kind of faith in Jesus. The German theologian Udo Schnelle notes that "the book" form provides 'the accountability and the dependability of what had happened'.

These two verses are linked to what precedes with the particles μὲν οὖν (men oun: "therefore"), such that 'those who have not seen the risen Christ and yet believed are blessed; therefore this book has been composed, to the end that you may believe'. The particle μὲν is then paired with δὲ (de) in verse 31 to frame the idea from the two verses, such that on the one hand many more signs of Jesus could not be reported, but on the other 'these have been committed to writing so that you may believe'.

The word 'sign' becomes the key to understand the risen Christ's appearances and their link with the 'signs' witnessed during Christ's public life. Schnelle notes "if the pre-Easter Jesus was able sēmeia poiein ("to do signs"), so after Easter these deeds can only be proclaimed and experienced as sēmeia gegrammens ("written signs")".

Verse 31 is considered to be "the shortest summary of Johannine theology", such that to expound each word or phrase in detail requires one to expound the whole book. The combination of Jesus' "Messiahship and divine sonship" becomes the ultimate conclusion of the presentation of Jesus in this gospel.

== Sources ==
- Bruner, Frederick Dale (2012). The Gospel of John: A Commentary. Wm. B. Eerdmans Publishing. ISBN 9780802866356.
- Guthrie, Donald (1994). "John". In Carson, D. A.; France, R. T.; Motyer, J. A.; Wenham, G. J. (eds.). New Bible Commentary: 21st Century Edition (4, illustrated, reprint, revised ed.). Inter-Varsity Press. pp. 1021–1065. ISBN 9780851106489.
- Kieffer, René (2007). "60. John". In Barton, John; Muddiman, John (eds.). The Oxford Bible Commentary (first (paperback) ed.). Oxford University Press. pp. 960–1000. ISBN 978-0199277186.

Preceded by John 20:29	Gospel of John; Chapter 20	Succeeded by John 21:1
