= Twelftree =

Twelftree is an English surname, likely a variant of Weldrick, originating as Queldrik, later altered to Tweltrick which was altered to Twelftree through association with twelve and tree. Notable people with the surname include:

- Graham Twelftree (born 1950), Australian biblical scholar
- Suzanne Twelftree (1956–2019), Australian wheelchair tennis player
