= Graham Twelftree =

Australian biblical scholar (born 1950)

Graham H. Twelftree (born 8 July 1950) is an Australian biblical scholar who recently served as the Academic Dean of the London School of Theology (LST) in London, UK. He continues to work for LST, predominantly supervising PhDs and focusing on research.

== Education ==
Upon earning his master's degree from Mansfield College, Oxford, Twelftree went on to study under New Testament scholar James D. G. Dunn at the University of Nottingham where he completing his doctoral dissertation Jesus, the Exorcist: A Contribution to the Study of the Historical Jesus.

== Career ==
Twelftree authored several books and journal articles including Jesus the Miracle Worker: A Historical & Theological Study (Grand Rapids: IVP, 1999). Through his writings Twelftree has made a significant contribution to what has been erroneously called the third quest for the historical Jesus. He also serves on the editorial board of The Journal for the Study of the Historical Jesus (Sheffield Academic Press). Before his post at London School of Theology, Twelftree was PhD Program Director and Charles Holman Professor of New Testament and Early Christianity at Regent University's School of Divinity in Virginia Beach, Virginia. He has also served as pastor of a Vineyard church in Adelaide, Australia.

== Writing ==
Twelftree has written or edited several books, journal articles, and reviews. He has noted that the historical Jesus was an exorcist.

=== Thesis ===
Twelftree, Graham H. (1975). The Concept of Man in Karl Marx and the New Testament (B.A. Hons). Adelaide: University of Adelaide, Dept. of Politics.

=== Books ===
- Twelftree, Graham H. (1984). Christ Triumphant: Exorcism Then and Now. London: Hodder and Stoughton.
- ———; Drayton, R. Dean, eds. (1989). Evangelism and Preaching in Secular Australia: Essays in Honour of Arthur Jackson. Melbourne: JBCE.
- ——— (1991). Heaven Sent: The Urgency of Mission. Homebush West, NSW: Anzea.
- ——— (1991). At Your Service: Ministry and Leadership. Homebush West, NSW: Anzea.
- ——— (1991). Seeking and Finding: It Matters What We Believe. Homebush West, NSW: Anzea.
- ——— (1993). Jesus the Exorcist: A Contribution to the Study of the Historical Jesus. Tubingen & Peabody, MA: Mohr & Hendrickson.
- ——— (1993). The Way of Discipleship: Mark 8 to 10. Sydney & Oxford: Albatross & IBRA.
- ——— (1994). Drive the Point Home: 200 Powerful and Poignant Stories for Speakers, Preachers and Teachers. Crowborough: Monarch.
- ——— (1996). Get the Point Across: 200 Effective and Entertaining Stories for Speakers, Preachers and Teachers. Crowborough: Monarch.
- ——— (1999). Jesus the Miracle Worker: A Historical and Theological Study. Downers Grove, IL: IVP.
- ——— (2002). Thinking Clearly About Life After Death. London: Monarch.
- ——— (2003). Your Point Being? 300 Striking Stories for Speakers, Preachers and Teachers. London: Monarch.
- ——— (2007). In the Name of Jesus: Exorcism Among Early Christians. Grand Rapids, MI: Baker Academic.
- ——— (2009). People of the Spirit: Exploring Luke's View of the Church. Grand Rapids, MI: Baker Academic.
- ——— (2011). The Cambridge Companion to Miracles. Cambridge, UK: Cambridge University Press.
- ——— (2013). Paul and the Miraculous. Grand Rapids, MI: Baker Academic.

=== Chapters ===
- ——— (1984). "Jesus in Jewish Traditions". In Wenham, David (ed.). Gospel Perspectives: The Jesus Tradition Outside the Gospels. Sheffield: JSOT Press. pp. 289–341. ISBN 9781850750062. OCLC 256442721.
- ——— (1986). "If I cast out demons?". In Wenham, David; Blomberg, Craig (eds.). Gospel Perspectives: The Miracles of Jesus. Sheffield: JSOT Press. pp. 361–400. ISBN 9781850750086. OCLC 247249083.
- "Devil and Demons," in New Dictionary of Theology, ed., Sinclair B. Ferguson and David F. Wright (Leicester and Downers Grove: IVP, 1988), pp. 196–98.
- "Exorcism," in New Dictionary of Theology, ed., Sinclair B. Ferguson and David F. Wright (Leicester and Downers Grove: IVP, 1988), pp. 244–46.
- "Mark," in The Message of the Bible, ed., George Carey (Tring, UK: Lion, 1988), pp. 156–64.
- "The Message of 1 Corinthians," in The Message of the Bible, ed., George Carey (Tring, UK: Lion, 1988), pp. 210–15.
- "The Message of 2 Corinthians," in The Message of the Bible, ed., George Carey (Tring, UK: Lion, 1988), pp. 216–219.
- "Church Agenda: The Lucan Perspective," in Evangelism and Preaching in Secular Australia: Essays in Honour of Arthur Jackson, ed., with R. Dean Drayton (Melbourne: JBCE, 1989), pp. 59–73.
- "Blasphemy," in Dictionary of Jesus and the Gospels, ed., Joel B. Green and Scot McKnight (Downers Grove and Leicester: IVP, 1992), pp. 75–77.
- "Demon, Devil, Satan," in Dictionary of Jesus and the Gospels, ed., Joel B. Green and Scot McKnight (Downers Grove and Leicester: IVP, 1992), 163–72.
- "Sanhedrin," in Dictionary of Jesus and the Gospels, ed., Joel B. Green and Scot McKnight (Downers Grove and Leicester: IVP, 1992), pp. 728–32.
- "Scribes," in Dictionary of Jesus and the Gospels, ed., Joel B. Green and Scot McKnight (Downers Grove and Leicester: IVP, 1992), pp. 732–35.
- "Temptation of Jesus," in Dictionary of Jesus and the Gospels, ed., Joel B. Green and Scot McKnight (Downers Grove and Leicester: IVP, 1992), pp. 821–27.
- "Healing, Illness," in Dictionary of Paul and His Letters, ed., Gerald F. Hawthorne, Ralph P. Martin and Daniel G. Reid (Downers Grove and Leicester: IVP, 1993), pp. 378–81.
- "Signs, Wonders, Miracles," in Dictionary of Paul and His Letters, ed., Gerald F. Hawthorne, Ralph P. Martin and Daniel G. Reid (Downers Grove and Leicester: IVP, 1993), pp. 875–77.
- "The Demonic," in New Dictionary of Christian Ethics and Pastoral Theology, ed., David J. Atkinson and David Field (Leicester and Downers Grove: IVP, 1995), pp. 296–97.
- "Mark," in G. Carey and R. Keeley, ed., The Bible for Everyday Life (Grand Rapids: Eerdmans, 1996)
- "The Message of 1 Corinthians," in G. Carey and R. Keeley, ed., The Bible for Everyday Life (Grand Rapids: Eerdmans, 1996)
- "The Message of 2 Corinthians," in G. Carey and R. Keeley, ed., The Bible for Everyday Life (Grand Rapids: Eerdmans, 1996)
- "Demon-Possession and Exorcism in the New Testament," with James D. G. Dunn, in The Christ and the Spirit, collected essays of James D. G. Dunn, 2 volumes (Edinburgh: T & T Clark, 1998), 2: 170–86.
- "Signs and Wonders," in New Dictionary of Biblical Theology, ed., T. D. Alexander and Brian S. Rosner (Downers Grove and Leicester: IVP, 2000), pp. 775–81.
- "Sanhedrin," in Dictionary of New Testament Background, ed., Craig A. Evans and Stanley E. Porter (Downers Grove and Leicester: IVP, 2000), pp. 1061–65.
- "Scribes," in Dictionary of New Testament Background, ed., Craig A. Evans and Stanley E. Porter (Downers Grove and Leicester: IVP, 2000), pp. 1086–89.
- "Spiritual Powers," in New Dictionary of Biblical Theology, ed., T. D. Alexander and Brian S. Rosner (Downers Grove and Leicester: IVP, 2000), pp. 796–802.
- "Testing," in New Dictionary of Biblical Theology, ed., T. D. Alexander and Brian S. Rosner (Downers Grove and Leicester: IVP, 2000), pp. 796–802.
- "Exorcism in the Fourth Gospel and the Synoptics," in Robert T. Fortna and Tom Thatcher, ed., Jesus in Johannine Tradition (Louisville, KY: Westminster John Knox, 2001), pp. 135–43.
- "The History of Miracles in the Jesus of History," in Scot McKnight and Grant R. Osborne, ed., The Face of New Testament Studies: A Survey of Recent Research (Grand Rapids, MI: Baker Academic and Leicester, UK: Apollos/IVP, 2004).
- "Beelzebul," New Interpreter's Dictionary of the Bible (Nashville, Tenn.: Abingdon, 2006), 1.417–418.
- "Jesus the Exorcist and Ancient Magic," in A Kind of Magic. Understanding Magic in the New Testament and its Religious Environment, ed., Michael Labahn, Bert Jan Lietaert Peerbolte (Library of New Testament Studies 306, European Studies in Christian Origins; London, New York: T&T Clark, 2007), pp. 57–86.

=== Journal articles ===
- ———; Dunn, James D. G. (1980). "Demon-Possession and Exorcism in the New Testament". Churchman. 94: 210–25.
- "The Place of Exorcism in Contemporary Ministry," St Mark's Review (Canberra) 127 (September 1986), pp. 25–39.
- "Exorcism in the New Testament and in Contemporary Ministry: A Reader's Guide, in Christian Book Newsletter 5 (8, November 1987), pp. 7–11.
- "Jesus as an Exorcist," in New Times (Adelaide, South Australia) May 1987, pp. 9–10.
- "Job," in Daily Bread (Melbourne: Scripture Union, January–March 1990).
- "Discipleship in Mark's Gospel," St Mark's Review (Canberra) 141 (1990), pp. 5–11.
- "La possession démoniaque et l'exorcisme dans le Nouveau Testament," with J. D. G. Dunn, Hokhma 51 (1992), pp. 34–52.
- "But What is Exorcism?" New Times (Adelaide, South Australia) March 1993, p. 14.
- "The Holy Spirit Hits Hope Valley," in Renewal (Crowborough, UK) 222 (November 1994), p. 50.
- "The Holy Spirit Hits Hope Valley," in Fresh Outpourings of the Holy Spirit: The Impact of Toronto, ed., Wallace Boulton (Crowborough, UK: Monarch, 1995), pp. 29–31.
- "The Place of Exorcism in Contemporary Ministry," Anvil 5 (St. Albans, UK) (2, 1988), pp. 133–50.
- "The Miracles of Jesus: Marginal or Mainstream"? Journal for the Study of the Historical Jesus (Sheffield University Press) 1 (1, 2003), 104–124.
- "Theology and the Church—Divorce or Remarriage?: A Response" (January 2004) Tyndale Fellowship for Biblical and Theological Research.
- "Prayer and the Coming of the Spirit in Acts," Expository Times 117 (7, 2006): 271–76.
