= John Wenham =

British biblical scholar (1913–1996)

John William Wenham (1913 – 13 February 1996) was a conservative Anglican biblical scholar, who devoted his professional life to academic and pastoral work. Two of his four sons, Gordon Wenham and David Wenham, are also noted theologians.

Wenham is known for his defense of biblical inerrancy and his belief in conditional immortality, a doctrine also known as annihilationism. He served as a Royal Air Force chaplain during World War II and held various academic positions throughout his career. His book Facing Hell is largely autobiographical, discussing his theological views. Wenham's academic work includes the well-regarded Elements of New Testament Greek and Redating Matthew, Mark and Luke, which examines the dating of the synoptic gospels. He is also known for his work Easter Enigma, which offers Bible exegesis arguing for the harmony of the gospel accounts. In Christ and the Bible, Wenham examines the traditional view of Christ's authoritative view on scripture and the reliability of the Bible text.

== Career ==
Wenham was born in Sanderstead, Surrey and was educated at Uppingham School, Pembroke College, Cambridge, and Ridley Hall. After his ordination in 1938, he was curate at St Paul's Church, Hadley Wood and taught at St John's College, Highbury. He served as a Royal Air Force chaplain during World War II, followed by his term as vicar of St Nicholas' Church, Durham from 1948 to 1953, and seventeen years as vice-principal of Tyndale Hall, Bristol.

== Theological views ==
Wenham had the distinction of being a conservative theologian, a defender of biblical inerrancy and 'essential infallibility', and one who held to the position of "conditional immortality" – or the belief that the human soul is not by default eternal in nature; this belief goes hand in hand with the notion that sinners, once cast into hell, are at some point burned up and essentially no longer exist (a doctrine also frequently referred to as annihilationism). In his book Facing Hell, An Autobiography 1913–1996, Wenham writes, "I believe that endless torment is a hideous and unscriptural doctrine which has been a terrible burden on the mind of the church for many centuries and a terrible blot on her presentation of the Gospel. I should indeed be happy, if before I die, I could help in sweeping it away." Facing Hell was published shortly after his death and is largely autobiographical, though also containing a paper Wenham published in regard to the doctrines of conditional immortality and the limited temporal nature of hell.

== Academic work ==
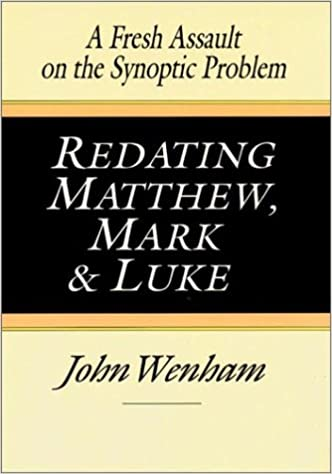
Book cover of John Wenham: Redating Matthew, Mark and Luke, 1992.

Among New Testament Greek scholars, Wenham's work The Elements of New Testament Greek is well regarded, and was the successor to Nunn's introductory Koine Greek textbook.

In 1992 John Wenham published Redating Matthew, Mark and Luke which discusses the dating of these gospels and the relationship of the gospels to one another (prior to Wenham's work, John A.T. Robinson, a liberal theologian, had written a widely known book titled Redating the New Testament which advocated an early date of the gospels). Wenham accepted the church father evidence of authorship, and inferred a very early date for each of the synoptic gospels. Wenham's work is well regarded by those who supported the Augustinian hypothesis which is the traditional view of gospel authorship. Scholars consider the two strongest defenders of the Augustinian Hypothesis in the twentieth century to be John Wenham and B.C. Butler. Wenham's work which gained him recognition among Bible scholars and lay persons was his work Easter Enigma which offered Bible exegesis that argued for the harmony of the gospel accounts. As a result of these two works Wenham is frequently cited in regard to these issues in the discipline of Christian apologetics.

In his work Redating Matthew, Mark and Luke Wenham wrote regarding the book of Matthew the following: "The [Church] fathers are almost unanimous in asserting that Matthew the tax-collector was the author, writing first, for Hebrews in the Hebrew language: Papias (c. 60–130), Irenaeus (c. 130–200), Pantaenus (died c. 190), Origen (c. 185–254), Eusebius (c. 260–340), Epiphanius of Salamis (c. 315–403), Cyril of Jerusalem (c. 315-86) and others write in this vein. The Medieval Hebrew gospel of Matthew in Even Bohan could be a corrupted version of the original. Though unrivaled, the tradition has been discounted on various grounds, particularly on the alleged unreliability of Papias, from whom some would derive the whole tradition." (John Wenham, Redating Matthew, Mark & Luke (1991), p. 116). Wenham also argued for the Gospel of Mark being the second gospel written which he claims is consistent both with internal evidence and with the testimony of the church fathers.

In his work Christ and the Bible Wenham sets out his case for Christ's authoritative view on scripture. In discussing the reliability of the Bible text in Chapter 7, Wenham describes the debate between critical and majority (Byzantine) text factions, himself leaning towards the Byzantine. Wenham in, 'The New Testament Text' (Evangel, 1994), wrote that if the 'pro-Byzantine editors [...] are right, this would mean that the great preoccupation with textual matters in modern New Testament study has largely been an unnecessary use of time and energy, as far as the recovery of the original text is concerned, and its results seriously misleading.'

== Publications ==
Rev. John Wenham's works include:

- The Elements of New Testament Greek (Cambridge: Cambridge University Press, 1965).
- Key to the Elements of New Testament greek (Cambridge: Cambridge University Press, 1965).
- Christ and the Bible (London: The Tyndale Press, 1972).
- The Goodness of God (London: Inter-Varsity Press, 1974)
- Easter Enigma, originally, Easter Enigma: Are the Resurrection Accounts in Conflict? (Exeter, Devon, UK: Paternoster Press, 1984; repr., Grand Rapids, Mich.: Zondervan Publishing House, n.d.).
- Redating Matthew, Mark and Luke: A Fresh Assault on the Synoptic Problem IVP: 1992
- Facing Hell, An Autobiography 1913–1996 Paternoster Press: 1998
