= David Wenham (theologian) =

British theologian

The Reverend David Wenham
- Born: 1945 (age 80–81)

Academic background
- Education: Pembroke College, Cambridge; University of Manchester; Ridley Hall, Cambridge
- Doctoral advisor: F. F. Bruce

Academic work
- Discipline: Theology
- Sub-discipline: New Testament studies Early Christianity
- Institutions: Universities and Colleges Christian Fellowship; Union Biblical Seminary; Tyndale House (Cambridge); Wycliffe Hall, Oxford; Trinity College, Bristol

David Wenham (born 1945) is a British theologian and Anglican clergyman, who is the author of several books on the New Testament.

== Early life and education ==
David Wenham was born in 1945, the son of theologian John Wenham. He was brought up in Durham and Bristol. He studied theology at Pembroke College, Cambridge, graduating with a Bachelor of Arts (BA) degree in 1967; as per tradition, his BA was later promoted to a Master of Arts (MA Cantab) degree. He undertook doctoral research under F. F. Bruce at the University of Manchester, completing his Doctor of Philosophy (PhD) degree in 1970.

He is a brother of Gordon Wenham.

== Career ==
=== Academic career ===
After becoming the Theological Students' Secretary with the UCCF he taught at Union Biblical Seminary in India before returning to become the director of Tyndale House's Gospels Research Project. Whilst in Cambridge he completed part-time ordination training at Ridley Hall, Cambridge, before moving to the staff of Wycliffe Hall in the University of Oxford. He was the tutor in New Testament at Wycliffe Hall from 1983 to 2007 and served under four different principals. He was also dean (2002 to 2005) and vice principal (2005 to 2006).

In 2007, he was appointed as senior tutor in New Testament at Trinity College, Bristol. From 2008 to 2012, he was also vice principal of the college. Since 2012, he has been a part-time tutor in the New Testament.

He is interested in the origins and historical reliability of the gospels. He is involved in helping people to understand the first century context of Jesus and the early church. He has written many publications including The Parables of Jesus (IVP), a guide to the teaching of Jesus and his most recent book, Paul and Jesus: the true story (SPCK/Eerdmans), an introduction to Paul, looking at questions of history and theology in the book of Acts, Paul's letters and the gospels.

=== Ordained Ministry ===
In 1981, Wenham began part-time training at Ridley Hall, Cambridge, an Evangelical Anglican theological college, in preparation for ordained ministry. He was ordained in the Church of England as a deacon in 1984 and as a priest in 1985. From 1996 to 2002, he was a non-stipendiary minister (NSM) in the Benefice of Shelswell in the Diocese of Oxford. From 2003 to 2007, he was an NSM at St Michael's Church, Cumnor. Between 2007 and 2013, he concentrated on his academic career and did not hold any dedicated ministry positions. He returned to St Michael's Church, Cumnor in 2013, and is the NSM of St Andrew's Church in Dean Court (benefice of St Michael's) in his semi-retirement.

== Personal life ==
David is married to Clare and they have two adult sons.

== Books ==
- Gospel Perspectives. London: Continuum International Publishing Group, 1984.
- The Parables of Jesus. Downers Grove: IVP, 1989.
- Paul: Follower of Jesus or Founder of Christianity?. Cambridge: Eerdmans, 1995.
- D. Wenham and S. Walton. Exploring the New Testament: A Guide to the Gospels & Acts. London: SPCK, 2001.
- Paul and Jesus: The True Story. London: SPCK, 2002.
- Did Paul Get Jesus Right? The Gospel According to Paul. Oxford: Lion, 2010.
- From Good News to Gospels: What Did the First Christians Say about Jesus? Grand Rapids: Eerdmans, 2018
