= John 20:24–25 =

- ← 20:23 20:26 →
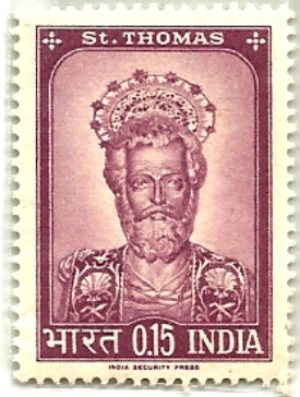
- Postal stamp of St Thomas (India).
- Book: Gospel of John
- Christian Bible part: New Testament

John 20:24–25 are the twenty-fourth and twenty-fifth verses of the twentieth chapter of the Gospel of John in the New Testament. They relate to the absence of Thomas the Apostle from "the house where the disciples had gathered" (John 20:19–23) when Jesus appeared to them for the first time. These two verses and those which follow when Jesus appears again a week later are "peculiar to John".

== Content ==
The original Koine Greek, according to the Textus Receptus, reads:

^{24} Θωμᾶς δὲ εἷς ἐκ τῶν δώδεκα ὁ λεγόμενος Δίδυμος οὐκ ἦν μετ' αὐτῶν ὅτε ἦλθεν ὁ Ἰησοῦς· ^{25} ἔλεγον οὖν αὐτῷ οἱ ἄλλοι μαθηταί Ἑωράκαμεν τὸν κύριον ὁ δὲ εἶπεν αὐτοῖς Ἐὰν μὴ ἴδω ἐν ταῖς χερσὶν αὐτοῦ τὸν τύπον τῶν ἥλων καὶ βάλω τὸν δάκτυλόν μου εἰς τὸν τύπον τῶν ἥλων καὶ βάλω τὴν χεῖρα μου εἰς τὴν πλευρὰν αὐτοῦ οὐ μὴ πιστεύσω·

In the King James Version of the Bible, these verses are translated as:

^{24} But Thomas, one of the twelve, called Didymus, was not with them when Jesus came. ^{25} The other disciples therefore said unto him, We have seen the Lord. But he said unto them, Except I shall see in his hands the print of the nails, and put my finger into the print of the nails, and thrust my hand into his side, I will not believe.

The modern World English Bible (WEB) translates these verses as:

^{24} But Thomas, one of the twelve, called Didymus, wasn't with them when Jesus came. ^{25} The other disciples therefore said to him, "We have seen the Lord!"
But he said to them, "Unless I see in his hands the print of the nails, put my finger into the print of the nails, and put my hand into his side, I will not believe."

For a collection of other versions see BibleHub John 20:24 and John 20:25.

== Analysis ==
Thomas, "one of the twelve", is mentioned here both in the Aramaic and Greek names, although he was mentioned previously in this gospel. The Greek word Didymos means "twin" and also "double" or "twofold". The term "one of the twelve" was also applied to Judas Iscariot in John 6:71. No reason is given for Thomas' absence.

Thomas has shown his difficulties to understand Jesus in John 11:16 and John 14:15, and this time he hesitated when confronted with the resurrection account. Thomas' emphatic disbelief of the disciples' testimony intensified his resolution to seek physical evidence to convince him that the risen Jesus was the Jesus he had known. This part has a parallel in Luke 24:39.

The palpable marks (Greek: τύπον, typon) – the 'print of the nails' in Jesus' hands and the pierced hole on his side (John 19:34) – fulfill an "apologetic function" for the readers of the gospel.

== Sources ==
- Guthrie, Donald (1994). "John". In Carson, D. A.; France, R. T.; Motyer, J. A.; Wenham, G. J. (eds.). New Bible Commentary: 21st Century Edition (4, illustrated, reprint, revised ed.). Inter-Varsity Press. pp. 1021–1065. ISBN 9780851106489.
- Kieffer, René (2007). "60. John". In Barton, John; Muddiman, John (eds.). The Oxford Bible Commentary (first (paperback) ed.). Oxford University Press. pp. 960–1000. ISBN 978-0199277186.

Preceded by John 20:23	Gospel of John; Chapter 20	Succeeded by John 20:26
