= Papyrus Oxyrhynchus 208 + 1781 =

New Testament 3rd century papyrus fragment of the Gospel of John in Greek

Papyrus 𝔓^{5}
- New Testament manuscript
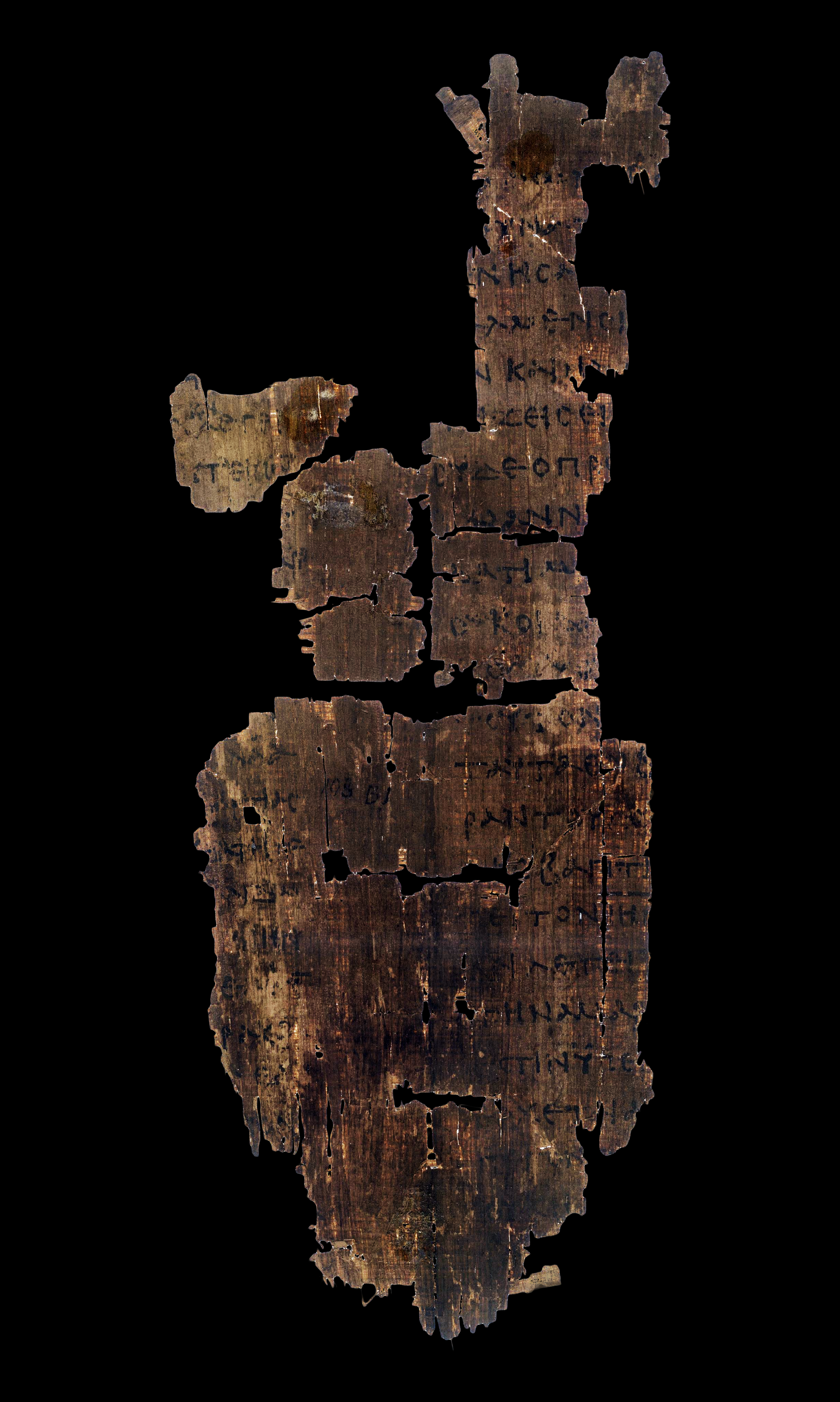
- Ms Oxyrhynchus 208 recto
- Name: P. Oxy. 208
- Text: John 1; 16; 20 †
- Date: ~250
- Script: Greek
- Found: Oxyrhynchus, Egypt
- Now at: British Library
- Cite: Grenfell & Hunt, Oxyrhynchus Papyri II, 1899, pp. 1 ff; XV, pp. 8-12.
- Size: 12.5 cm by 25 cm
- Type: Western text-type
- Category: I
- Hand: documentary hand
- Note: close to Codex Sinaiticus

Papyrus 5 is an early copy of the New Testament in Greek. It is a papyrus manuscript of the Gospel of John. It is designated by the siglum 𝔓^{5} in the Gregory-Aland numbering of New Testament manuscripts. Using the study of comparative writing styles (palaeography), it has been assigned to the early 3rd century. The papyrus is housed in the British Library. It has survived in a very fragmentary condition, which has resulted in differing ways of transcribing the text.

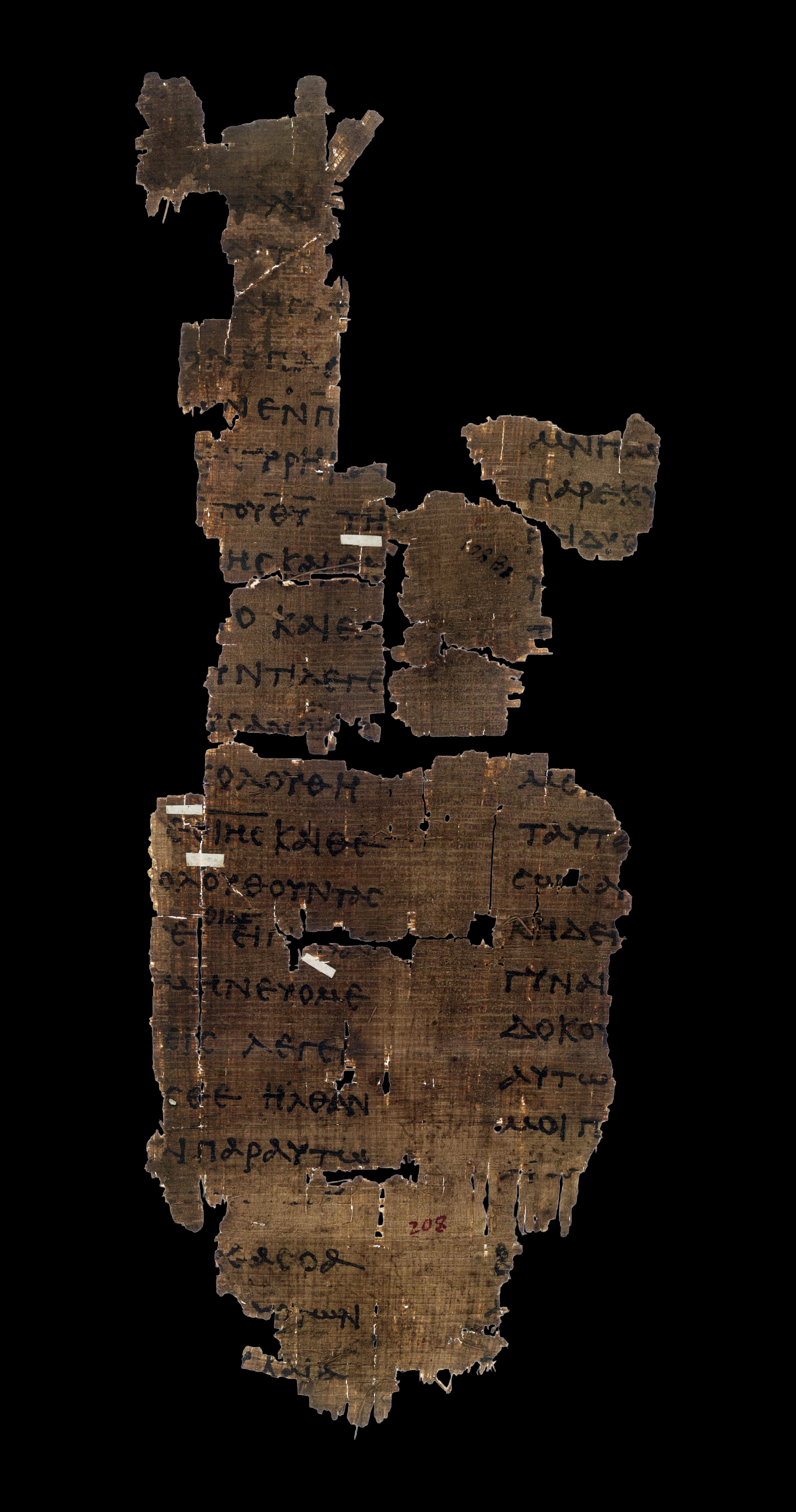
Ms Oxyrhynchus 208 verso

== Description ==
The manuscript is a fragment of three leaves, written in one column per page, 27 lines per page. The surviving text of John are verses 1:23–31,33–40; 16:14–30; 20:11–17,19–20,22–25.

It was written in a documentary hand, in a round, upright uncial of medium size. It uses the nomina sacra throughout (sacred names, these being words/titles considered sacred in Christianity), with the following ones extant: Ι̅Η̅Ν̅ / Ι̅Η̅Σ̅ (Ιησους/Iesous/Jesus), Π̅Ρ̅ / Π̅Ρ̅Α̅ / Π̅Ρ̅Σ̅ (πατηρ/pater/Father), Θ̅Υ̅ (θεος/theos/God), though with ανθρωπος written out in full, and not as a nomen sacrum.

There is a tendency to brevity, especially in omitting unnecessary pronouns and conjunctions.

== Text ==
Transcription of the text according to the reconstruction of papyrologist and Biblical scholar Philip W. Comfort.

[leaf 1 verso (John 1:23–32)]^{[1:23]} εγ]ω̣ φ̣ων[η] β̣ο̣[ωντος εν τη ερημω ευ]θ̣υνατ[ε την οδον κ̅υ̅ καθως ει π]ε̣ν ησα[ιας ο προφητης ^{[24]} και απεσ τ]α̣λμενοι [ησαν εκ των φαρισαι ω]ν ^{[25]} και ηρ̣ω̣[τησαν αυτον τι ουν βα π̣τ̣ιζεις ει [συ ουκ ει ο χ̅ς̅ ουδε ηλιας ουδε ο προ[φητης ^{[26]} απεκριθη αυτοις ο ιωανν[ης λεγων εγω βαπτιζω εν υ δατι μ[εσος υμων εστηκεν ον υμεις ουκ οιδα[τε ^{[27]} ο οπισω μου ερχομε ν]ος [ο]υ ο[υκ ειμι αξιος ινα λυσω αυ του τον [ιμαντα του υποδηματος^{[28]} ταυτα εν β[ηθανια εγενετο πε ραν του ιο[ρδανου οπου ην ο ιωαν ν]ης βαπτι[ζων ^{[29]} τη επαυριον βλε πει τον ι̅η̅ν̅ [ερχομενον προς αυτον και λεγει [ιδε ο αμνος του θ̅υ̅ ο αιρω την αμαρ[τιαν του κοσμου ^{[30]} ουτος εστιν υπερ [ου εγω ειπον οπισω μου ερχεται α[νηρ ος εμπροσθεν μου γεγον[εν οτι πρωτος μου ην ^{[31]} καγω ο̣υ̣κ η̣δ̣[ειν αυτον αλλ ινα φανερω θ̣η̣ [τω ισραηλ δια τουτο ηλθον ε γ̣[ω εν υδατι βαπτιζων ^{[32]} και εμαρτυ [ρησεν ιωαννης λεγων οτι τεθεαμαι] [το π̅ν̅α̅ καταβαινον ως περιστεραν [εξ ουρανου και εμεινεν επ αυτον]	[leaf 1 recto (John 1:33–41)]^{[33]} καγω ουκ ηδειν αυτον] αλλ ο π̣[εμ ψας με βαπτιζειν εν υ]δατ[ι] ε̣[κει νος μοι ειπεν εφ ον αν ι]δης το̣ [π̅ν̅α̅ καταβαινον και μεν]ον επ αυ[τον ουτος εστιν ο βαπτιζ]ων εν π̅ν̅ι̅ αγιω^{[34]} καγω εωρακα και μεμ]αρτυρηκα ο̣ τι ουτος εστιν ο εκλεκτο]ς του θ̅υ̅ ^{[35]} τη ε̣ παυριον ιστηκει ο ιωανν]η̣ς και εκ των μαθητων αυτου δ]υ̣ο̣ ^{[36]} και εμ̣ βλεψας τω ι̅η̅υ̅ περιπατο]υντι λεγε[ι ιδε ο αμνος του θ̅υ̅ ^{[37]} και εκ]ουσαν οι δ̣υ̣ο̣ μαθηται λαλουντος και η]κολουθη σαν τω ι̅η̅υ̅ ^{[38]} στραφεις δ]ε ο ι̅η̅ς̅ και θε ασαμενος αυτους ακ]ολοθουντας λεγει αυτοις τι ζητει]τε <οι δε> ειπα̣ν̣ <αυ> <τω> ραββει ο λεγεται ερ]μηνευονε νον διδασκαλε που μεν]εις ^{[39]} λεγει αυτοις ερχεσθε και οψε]σθε ηλθαν ουν και ειδαν που μενει κ]αι παρ αυτω εμειναν την ημεραν] ε̣κ̣ε̣ι̣ν̣η̣ν̣ ω ρα ην ως δεκατη ^{[40]} ην ανδ]ρεας ο α δελφος σιμωνος πετρου εις εκ δ]υο των ακουσαντων παρα ιωαννο]υ̣ και α [κολουθησαντων αυτω ^{[41]} ευρισκει] [ουτος πρωτον τον αδελφον τον ιδιον] [σιμωνα και λεγει αυτω ευρηκαμεν] [τον μεσσιαν ο εστιν ερμηνευομενον]

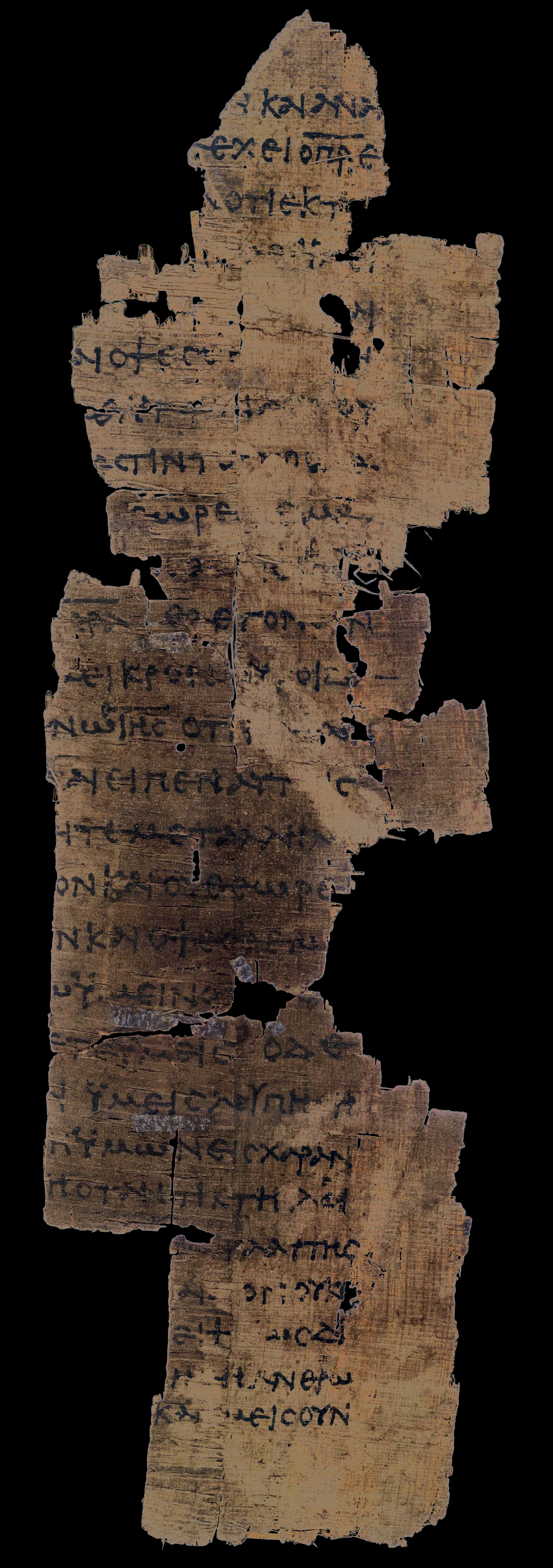
Leaf 2 recto (fragment of John 16:14-22)

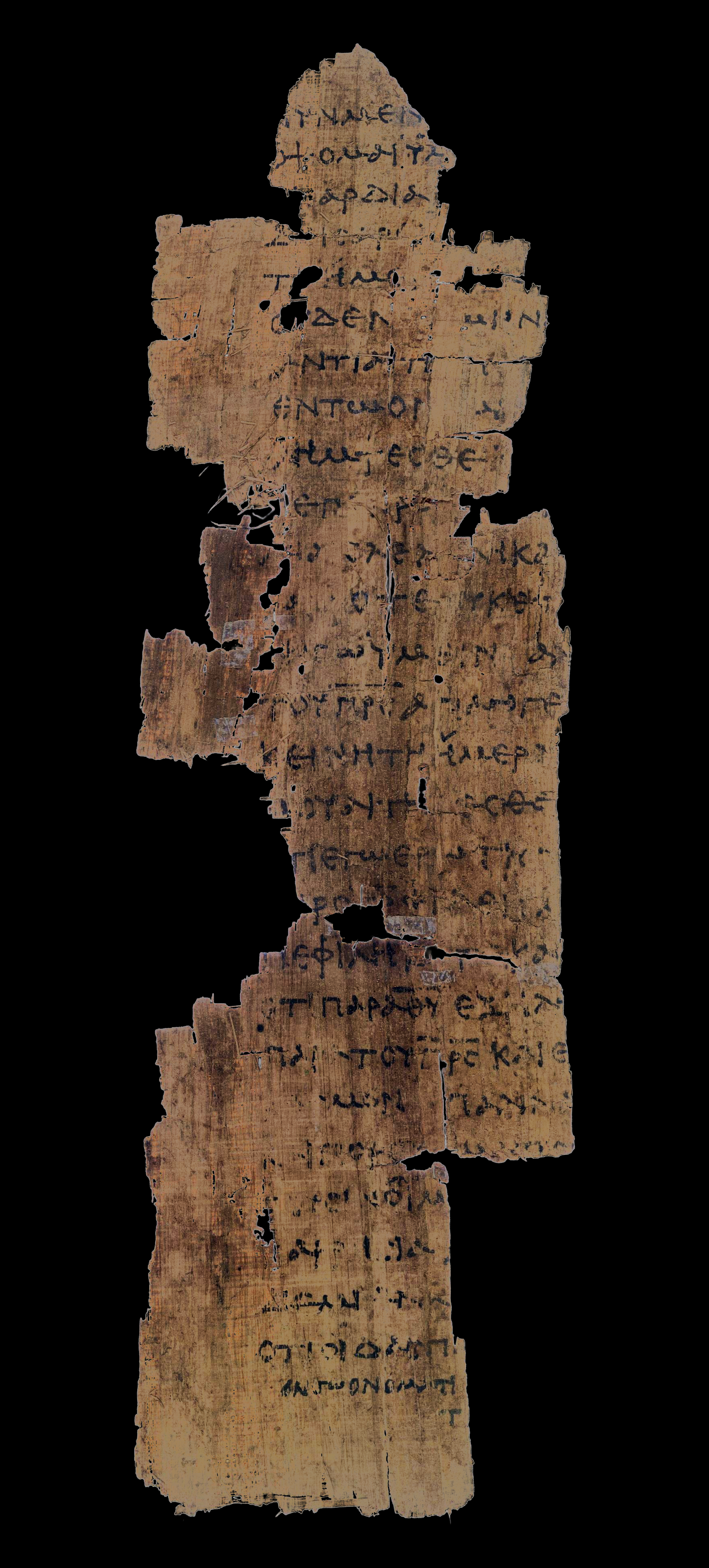
Leaf 2 verso (fragment of John 16:22-30)

[leaf 2 recto (John 16:14–22)]^{[16:14]} οτι εκ του εμου λημψετ]α̣ι και ανα[γ γελει υμειν ^{[15]} παντα οσ]α̣ εχει ο π̅ρ̅ ε εμα εστιν δια τουτο ειπο]ν οτι εκ τ[ου εμου λαμβανει κα]ι αν[αγ]γ̣ε̣λ̣ε̣ι̣ υμει^{[16]} μεικρον και ουκετι θεωρειτε με κ]αι παλιν μεικρον κ]αι οψεσθε [με ^{[17]} ειπαν ουν τινες εκ των μ]αθητων αυτου προς αλληλους τι] εστιν τουτο ο λε γει ημειν μεικρον και ου] θεωρει̣τε με και παλιν μεικρον κ]αι οψ]ε̣σ̣θ̣ε̣ μ̣ε̣ κ̣α̣ι̣ [οτ]ι̣ υπαγω προς τον] π̅ρ̅α̅ ^{[18]} ελεγον ο̣υ̣ν τι εστιν τουτο] μ̣εικρον ο̣υ̣κ οιδα μεν τι λαλει ^{[19]} εγ]νω <ο> ι̅η̅ς̅ οτι η̣[θ]ε̣λον αυτον ερωταν] κ̣αι ειπενπ αυτ[ο]ις περι τουτου ζητ]ε̣ιτε με μετ αλληλω[ν οτι ειπον μεικρ]ον και ου θεωρει[τε με και παλιν μεικρο]ν και οψεσθε με^{[20]} αμην αμην λεγ]ω υμειν οτ[ι κ]λα[υ σετε και θρηνησ]ετε υμεις ο δε κοσμος χαρησετ]αι υμεις λυπηθη σεσθε αλλ η λυπ]η υμων εις χαραν γενησεται ^{[21]} η γυν]η οταν τικτη λυ πην εχει οτι ηλθεν] η ωρα αυτης οταν δε γεννηση το] παιδ[ι]ον ουκε̣ τι μνημονευει της θλ]ειψ[ε]ως δι α την χαραν οτι εγενν]ηθ̣η ανθρω πος εις τον κοσμον ] ^{[22]} και υμεις ουν	[leaf 2 verso (John 16:22–30)] νυν μεν [λυπεν εχετε παλιν δε οψομαι υ[μας και χαρησεται υμων η καρδια [και την χαραν υμων ου δεις αρει [αφ] υμων ^{[23]} και εν εκεινη τη ημερ̣[α] ε[μ]ε̣ [ουκ ερωτησετε ουδεν [α]μην α̣[μην λεγω υμειν αν τι αιτη[σ]η̣τε [τον π̅ρ̅α̅ δωσει υμειν^{[24]} εν τω ον[ο]ματ̣[ι μου αιτειτε και και λημψεσθε ι[να η χαρα υμων η π̣επληρω[μ]ε[ν]η [^{[25]} ταυτα εν παροι μ̣ιαις λελ[α]ληκα [υ]μειν ερχεται ω̣ρ̣α̣ οτε ο̣υκετ[ι εν παροιμιαις λα λησω υμειν αλλα παρρησια περι του π̅ρ̅ς̅ απαγγε[λω υμειν [^{[26]} εν ε κεινη τη ημερα [εν τω ονοματι μου αιτησεσθε [και ου λεγω υμειν ο]τι εγω ερωτησ[ω τον π̅ρ̅α̅ [^{[27]} αυτος γ]αρ ο π̅ρ̅ φιλει υμ[ας οτι υμεις εμε πεφιληκα̣τε̣ και [πεπιστευκατε οτι παρα θ̅υ̅ εξηλθ[ον ^{[28]} εξηλθον παρα του π̅ρ̅ς̅ και ε[ληλυθα εις τον κ̣ο̣σ̣μον παλιν α̣[φιημι τον κοσμον και πορευομαι προ[ς τον π̅ρ̅α̅ ^{[29]} λε γ̣ο̣υ̣σ̣ιν <αυτω> οι μ[αθηται αυτου ιδε νυν εν παρρη̣σια λ[αλεις και παροιμιαν ου δεμιαν λ[εγεις ^{[30]} νυν οιδαμεν οτι οιδας πα̣[ντα ου χρειαν εχεις

[leaf 3 recto (John 20:9–19)] [^{[9]} ουδεπω γαρ ηδεισαν την γραφην] [οτι δει αθτον εκ νεκρων αναστηναι] [^{[10]} απηλθον ουν παλιν προς αυτους οι] [μαθηται ^{[11]} μαρια δε ειστηκει προς τω] μνημ[ειω εξω κλαιουσα ως ουν εκλαιεν παρεκυ[ψεν εις το μνημειον ^{[12]} και θεω ρει δυο [αγγελους εν λευκοις καθεζομε ν[ους ενα προς τη κεφαλη και ενα προς τ[οις ποσιν οπου εκειτο το σωμα του ι̅η̅υ̅^{[13]} και λεγουσιν αυτη εκεινοι γυναι τι] [κλαιεις λεγει αυτοις οτι ηραν τον κ̅ν̅] μου και ουκ οιδα που εθηκαν αυτον^{[14]} ταυτα [ειπουσα εστραφη εις τα οπι σω και [θεωρει τον ι̅η̅ν̅ εστωτα και ου κ ηδει [οτι ι̅η̅ς̅ εστιν ^{[15]} λεγει αυτη ι̅η̅ς̅ γυναι [τι κλαιεις τινα ζητεις εκεινη δοκου[σα οτι ο κηπουρος εστιν λεγει αυτω [κ̅ε̅ ει συ εβαστασας αυτον ειπε μοι π[ου εθηκας αυτον καγω αυτον αρω [^{[16]} λεγει αυτη ι̅η̅ς̅ μαριαμ στραφει σα εκεινη λεγει αυτω εβραιστι ραβ] β[ουνι [κ̅ε̅ μου ^{[17]} λεγει αυτη ι̅η̅ς̅ μη μ[ου απτου ουπω γαρ αναβεβηκα προς τ̣[ον π̅ρ̅α̅ πορευου δε προς τους αδελ [φους μου και ειπε αυτοις αναβαινω] [προς τον π̅ρ̅α̅ μου και π̅ρ̅α̅ υμων και] [θ̅ν̅ μου και θ̅ν̅ υμων ^{[18]} ερχεται μαριαμ] [η μαγδαληνη αγγελλουσα τοις μαθη] [ταις οτι εωρακα τον κ̅ν̅ και ταυτα]	[leaf 3 verso (John 20:19–26)] [ειπεν αυτη ^{[19]} ουσης ουν οψιας τη] [ημερα εκεινη τη μια σαββατων] [και των θυρων κεκλεισμενων] [οπου ησαν οι μαθηται δια τον] φοβον των ιουδαιων] η̣[λθεν ο ι̅η̅ς̅ και εστη εις το μεσο]ν <και> λεγει ειρηνη υμειν ^{[20]} και τ]ουτ' ειπω εδειξεν τας χειρας και την πλε]υ ραν εχαρησαν ουν οι μαθητ]αι ι [δοντες τον κ̅ν̅ ^{[21]} ειπεν ουν αυτοις] [ο ι̅ς̅ παλιν ειρηνη υμειν καθως] [απεσταλκεν με ο π̅ρ̅ καγω πεμ] [πω υμας ^{[22]} και τουτο ειπων ενεφυσ ησεν και λεγει αυτοις λαβετε π̅ν̅α̅ α γιον ^{[23]} αν τινων αφητε ταςν αμ]αρτιας αφεωνται αυτοις αν τινων] κρατητε κεκρατηνται ^{[24]} θωμας εις εκ τω]ν δω δεκα ο λεγομενος διδυμος ο]υκ ην μετ αυτων οτε ουν ηλθ]εν ι̅η̅ς̅^{[25]} ελεγον αυτω οι μαθηται εω]ρακα μεν τον κ̅ν̅ ο δε ειπεν αυτοι]ς εαν μη ιδω εν ταις χερσιν τον τυ]π̣ο̣ν̣ [των ηλων και βαλω τον δακτυλον] [μου εις τον τυπον των ηλων και] [βαλω μου την χειρα εις την πλευ] [ραν αυτου ου μη πιστυσς ^{[26]} και [μεθ ημερας οκτω παλιν ησαν εσω]

Scribes and Correctors

In John 1:38 "οι δε" was added superlineary; αυ was deleted by dots above the letters.

In John 16:19 "ο" was added superlineary.

In John 16:29 αυτω was added superlineary.

In John 20:19 και was added superlineary.

== Textual character ==
In John 1:34 it reads ὁ ἐκλεκτός together with the manuscripts 𝔓^{106}, א, b, e, ff^{2}, syr^{c, s}.

In John 16:17 at line 7 of the recto of the second fragment there appears to be extra space which would require some additional material.

In John 16:20, λυπηθησεσθε originally read λουπηθησεσθε, to which the scribe corrected to λυπηθησεσθε. In 16:21, λυπην originally read λοιπην, to which the scribe corrected to λυπην. In 16:27, it singularly omits εγω. In 20:19 the scribe originally omitted και, but then added it superlinearly later on.

At line 19 of the third folio of the recto (John 20:16) the missing fragment is difficult for a reconstruction. Grenfell and Hunt remarked that there is no space for the ordinary reading ο λεγεται διδασκαλε because a line should have 34 letters, which is too long. Grenfell and Hunt rejected another possible reading κ̅ε̅ διδασκαλε, which is found in Codex Bezae (possible conflation), and proposed κ̅ε̅ alone, because Domine is found in Codex Vercellensis and in Codex Usserianus I, but in the reconstructed text of the manuscript they did not decide to include this proposed variant to the text:

αρω [λεγει αυτη ι̅η̅ς̅ μαριαμ στραφει
[σα εκεινη λεγει αυτω εβραιστι ραβ
β[ουνι . . . . . . . . . . . λεγει αυτη ι̅η̅ς̅

All the editors agree that the space is insufficient for ο λεγεται διδασκαλε (John 20,16) but κ̅ε̅ alone is too short and it is not supported by any Greek manuscript. Elliott and Parker have suggested ο λεγεται κ̅ε̅. It was supported by Biblical scholar Peter Head. Comfort proposed κ̅ε̅ μου though this reading is not supported by any known Greek manuscript. It is close for κ̅ε̅ διδασκαλε of Codex Bezae and Old-Latin Magister Domine or Domine.

The Greek text of this codex is considered a representative of the Western text-type. Biblical scholar Kurt Aland ascribed it as a "Normal text", and placed it in Category I of his New Testament manuscript classification system. It stays in close agreement with Codex Sinaiticus against Codex Vaticanus (e.g. John 1:27.34; 16:22.27.28; 20:25). "This agreement is unfortunately obscured by mutilation".

== History ==
The manuscript was discovered at the end of the 19th century by Grenfell and Hunt in Oxyrhynchus, Egypt. The first and third leaves were published in Oxyrhynchus Papyri, Part II (1899), no. 208. Biblical scholar Caspar René Gregory classified it under number 5 on his list. The second leaf (John 16:14–30) was published in 1922 as Oxyrhynchus no. 1781.

It was examined by Grenfell, Hunt, Karl Wessely, Schofield, and Comfort.

It is currently housed at the British Library (Inv. nos. 782, 2484) in London.

== See also ==
- John 1, John 16, John 20
- List of New Testament papyri
- Oxyrhynchus papyri
- Oxyrhynchus Papyri 159 through 207
- Papyrus Oxyrhynchus 209
