= John 20:23 =

- ← 20:22 20:24 →
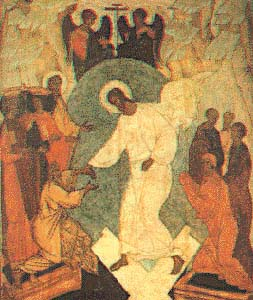
- A Russian Resurrection icon, celebrating and commemorating the Great Pascha (Easter) (16th century)
- Book: Gospel of John
- Christian Bible part: New Testament

John 20:23 is the twenty-third verse of the twentieth chapter of the Gospel of John in the New Testament. It records Jesus giving the power of forgiveness to the apostles during his first appearance after the resurrection.

== Content ==
The original Koine Greek, according to the Textus Receptus, reads:

ἄν τινων ἀφῆτε τὰς ἁμαρτίας ἀφιένται αὐτοῖς ἄν τινων κρατῆτε κεκράτηνται

In the King James Version of the Bible, this verse is translated as:

Whose soever sins ye remit, they are remitted unto them; and whose soever sins ye retain, they are retained.

The modern World English Bible (WEB) translates the passage as:

Whoever's sins you forgive, they are forgiven them. Whoever's sins you retain, they have been retained.

For a collection of other versions see BibleHub John 20:23.

== Analysis ==
The account of Jesus' appearance in "the house where the disciples had gathered" (John 20:19–23) is similar to the account in the Gospel of Luke (Luke 24:36–49), when Jesus appeared to his disciples in Jerusalem (after the return of two of his followers who met Jesus on the road to Emmaus) on the evening of the day of his resurrection.

Jesus' promise here is given to the whole group of disciples: the verbs ἀφῆτε, aphēte, "forgive" and κρατῆτε, kratēte, "retain", are both plurals. This promise parallels the promise in Matthew 16:19 and Matthew 18:18, where the text refers to "binding" and "loosing". (Note: But see also Matthew Poole's comment: "Whether Matthew 18:18 be a parallel text to this, I doubt".)

The disciples' power to forgive sins is linked to the gift of the Spirit in John 20:22, and does not reside in human power. The verbs for forgiving and retaining are in the passive form, indicating that God is the one in action. Thus, most Protestants believe that this is in the Gospel message, that those who respond with faith to the Gospel will receive grace, their sins forgiven by God.

With the statement in this verse, Jesus declares that in his messianic community (the "new covenant") his followers ("Christians") now hold the key to membership, in contrast to the authority held by the Jewish leadership (represented by the Sanhedrin and the Pharisees at that time) to affirm or deny acceptance in the synagogues (the "old covenant").

John 20:23 is seen as the origin for the practice of Confession and Absolution by the Catholic Church, Lutheran Churches, Anglican Communion, Eastern Orthodox Churches, Oriental Orthodox Churches, Assyrian Church of the East, and Irvingian Churches. These Christian denominations teach that the Church has been given the apostolic power to forgive sins.

== See also ==
- Binding and loosing
- Keys of the kingdom
- Power of the Keys

== Sources ==
- Guthrie, Donald (1994). "John". In Carson, D. A.; France, R. T.; Motyer, J. A.; Wenham, G. J. (eds.). New Bible Commentary: 21st Century Edition (4, illustrated, reprint, revised ed.). Inter-Varsity Press. pp. 1021–1065. ISBN 9780851106489.
- Kieffer, René (2007). "60. John". In Barton, John; Muddiman, John (eds.). The Oxford Bible Commentary (first (paperback) ed.). Oxford University Press. pp. 960–1000. ISBN 978-0199277186.

Preceded by John 20:22	Gospel of John; Chapter 20	Succeeded by John 20:24
