= Gordon Wenham =

British Old Testament scholar and writer (1943–2025)

Photo of Gordon Wenham

Gordon J. Wenham (/ˈwɛnəm/; 21 May 1943 – 13 May 2025) was a British Reformed Old Testament scholar and author. Tremper Longman called him "one of the finest evangelical commentators today."

== Early life and education ==
Wenham read theology at Cambridge University, graduating in 1965 with distinction, and completed his PhD on Deuteronomy in 1970.

He was awarded several scholarships in connection with Old Testament studies and studied in Germany, the US, and Israel.

He was the son of John Wenham and the brother of David Wenham.

While at Cambridge, he was active in the Cambridge Inter-Collegiate Christian Union.

He first met his wife Lynne when she was a student at Cambridge, 1966–1969.

== Career ==
Wenham studied theology at Cambridge University, and went on to do Old Testament research at King's College London. He spent time at Harvard University and in Jerusalem at the École Biblique and the Hebrew University.

He taught Old Testament in the Department of Semitic Studies of Queen's University in Belfast before moving to Cheltenham. He held teaching positions or served as visiting lecturer at a range of institutions around the world. He worked at the University of Gloucestershire from 1987 (or earlier). From 1995 to 2005, Wenham was Senior Professor of Old Testament at the University of Gloucestershire. He then moved to Trinity College, Bristol.

== Death ==
Wenham died in Cheltenham on 13 May 2025, at the age of 81.

== Works ==
Wenham wrote a large number of articles and several books, including commentaries on Genesis, Leviticus, and Numbers, and later a study of Old Testament narrative ethics, Story as Torah (T & T Clark, 2000), and Exploring the Old Testament: the Pentateuch (SPCK: 2003).
