= Donald Guthrie (theologian) =

British New Testament scholar (1916–1992)

- Born: 21 February 1916; Ipswich, Suffolk
- Died: 8 September 1992 (aged 76); Pinner, Middlesex
- Occupation: New Testament scholar
- Title: Lecturer and Vice-Principal
- Spouse: Mary (née Freeman)
- Children: four sons, two daughters

Academic background
- Education: London Bible College
- Thesis: (Ph.D. 1961)

Academic work
- Discipline: Biblical studies
- Sub-discipline: NT studies
- Notable works: New Testament Introduction (1962) & New Testament Theology (1981)

Donald Guthrie (February 21, 1916 – September 8, 1992) was a British New Testament scholar, best known for his New Testament Introduction (1962) and New Testament Theology (1981) which are recognized as significant books related to the New Testament.

== Life ==
Guthrie studied on the Bachelor of Divinity programme at London Bible College (now London School of Theology), which was accredited by the University of London. Before completing his degree, Guthrie began lecturing at the college, at the invitation of the college's principal, Ernest Kevan. He continued lecturing at the college until his retirement in 1982, becoming Vice-Principal in 1978. He then served as President of the college from 1983 until his death.

== Works ==
=== Books ===
- Guthrie, Donald (1956). The Pastoral Epistles and the Mind of Paul. Tyndale New Testament lecture. Vol. 1955. London: Tyndale Press. OCLC 5001538.
- ——— (1957). The Pastoral Epistles. Tyndale New Testament Commentaries. Grand Rapids, MI & Leicester: Eerdmans & Inter-Varsity Press. ISBN 9780802814135. OCLC 759495.
- ——— (1964). Epistles from Prison: Philippians, Ephesians, Colossians, Philemon. Bible Studies. Vol. 19. London & New York: Lutterworth Press & Abingdon Press. OCLC 642698.
- ———; Motyer, J. A., eds. (1970). The New Bible Commentary (Revised ed.). Grand Rapids, MI & Leicester: Eerdmans & Inter-Varsity Press. OCLC 82785.
- ——— (1970). A Shorter Life of Christ. Contemporary Evangelical Perspectives. Grand Rapids, MI: Zondervan. ISBN 9780310254416. OCLC 101237.
- ——— (1972). Jesus the Messiah: an illustrated life of Christ. Grand Rapids, MI: Zondervan. OCLC 483425.
- ——— (1975). The Apostles. Grand Rapids, MI: Zondervan. ISBN 978-0-310-25421-8. OCLC 1543882.
- ——— (1981). New Testament Theology. Master reference collection. Downers Grove, IL: Inter-Varsity Press. ISBN 9780877849650. OCLC 7434241.
- ——— (1981). Galatians. New Century Bible Commentary. Grand Rapids, MI: Eerdmans. ISBN 9780802819062. OCLC 824657207.
- ——— (1983). The Letter to the Hebrews. Tyndale New Testament Commentaries. Grand Rapids, MI & Leicester: Eerdmans & Inter-Varsity Press. ISBN 9780802814272. OCLC 9350465.
- ——— (1984). Bible guide to Ephesians, Philippians, and Colossians. Grand Rapids, MI & Leicester: Eerdmans. ISBN 9780802800848. OCLC 11970117.
- ——— (1986). A Guide to John's Gospel. Grand Rapids, MI & Leicester: Eerdmans. ISBN 9780802802569. OCLC 15252341.
- ——— (1987). The Relevance of John's Apocalypse. Didsbury Lectures. Grand Rapids, MI & Exter, UK: Eerdmans & Paternoster Press. ISBN 9780802803290. OCLC 16227146.
- ——— (1990). New Testament Introduction. Master reference collection. Downers Grove, IL: Inter-Varsity Press. ISBN 9780830814022. OCLC 20992943.

=== Articles ===
- ——— (1956). "Tertullian and Pseudonymity". Expository Times. 67: 341f.
- ——— (1962). "The Development of the Idea of Canonical Pseudopigraphy in New Testament Criticism". Vox Evangelica. 1: 43–59. PDF
- ——— (October 1962). "Recent Literature on the Petrine Epistles". Themelios. 1 (1): 13–23.
- ——— (1963). "Recent Literature on the Acts of the Apostles". Vox Evangelica. 2: 33–49. PDF
- ——— (Summer 1965). "Dilemma in New Testament Criticism". TSF Bulletin. 42: 4–9.
- ——— (Summer 1965). "Christianity and the Computer". TSF Bulletin. 42: 9–11.
- ——— (1965). "Some Recent Books on the Gospels". Vox Evangelica. 4: 43–54. PDF
- ——— (1966). "Oral Tradition in New Testament Times". Themelios. 3 (3): 24–30.
- ——— (1968). "Form Criticism". Themelios. 5 (1): 8–14.

== Festschrift ==
- Rowdon, Harold Hamlyn, ed. (1982). Christ the Lord: Studies in Christology presented to Donald Guthrie. Downers Grove, IL: Inter-Varsity Press. ISBN 9780877849551. OCLC 8221716.
