= Sindon (cloth) =

Textile made mainly from linen

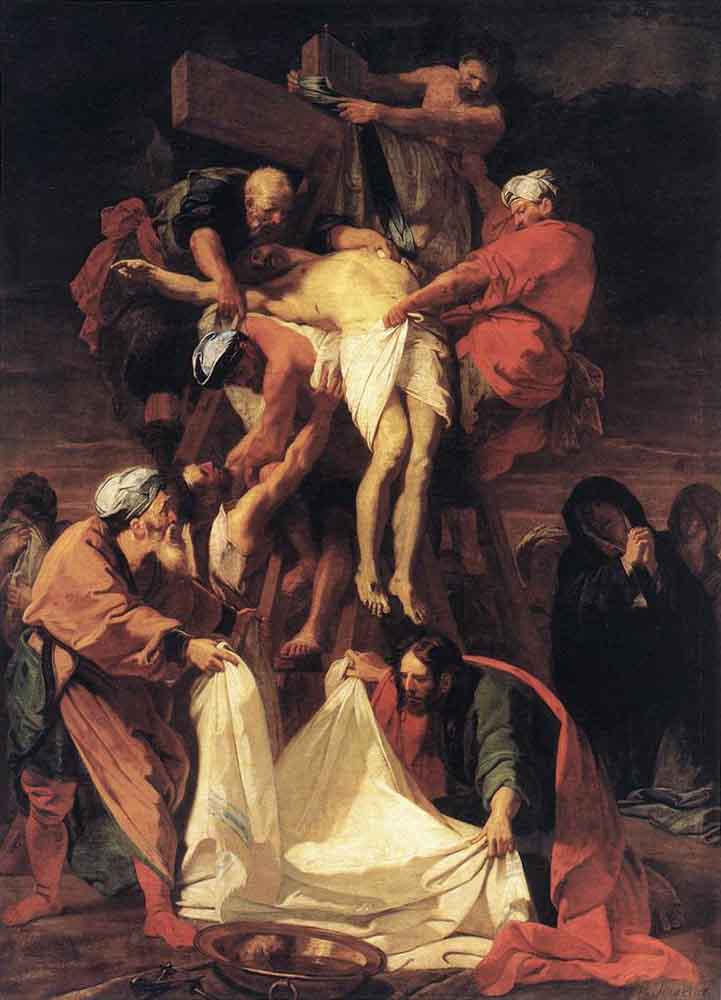
Descent from the Cross

Sindon, also known as Syndone, was a fine cloth that resembled muslin or cambric. It had multiple applications, including as a material used in furnishing, covering the pyx, and was referenced in the Bible and ancient Greek literature. According to Christian tradition, it was Sindon cloth in which the body of Jesus of Nazareth was shrouded.

== History ==
Sindon was an ancient Babylonian textile primarily made from linen. There are varying accounts of the texture and material, with some sources indicating cotton, linen, and silk. Sindon presents a source of confusion in various contexts. Certain scholars have interpreted this term to refer to dyed cotton fabrics. It was also alternatively known as 'Syndone' and held the transitional designation of 'cendal,' which had associations with silken materials. Records of exports from England in 1382 indicate that Sindon was a type of silk material. Sindon cloth has been produced in Sindh, Pakistan, since before the Christian era, and was exported to Mediterranean countries.

Sindon was also used for interior decoration. Sindon cloth curtains in green were used to decorate King Edward's chamber according to historical records of his wardrobe.

=== Christianity ===
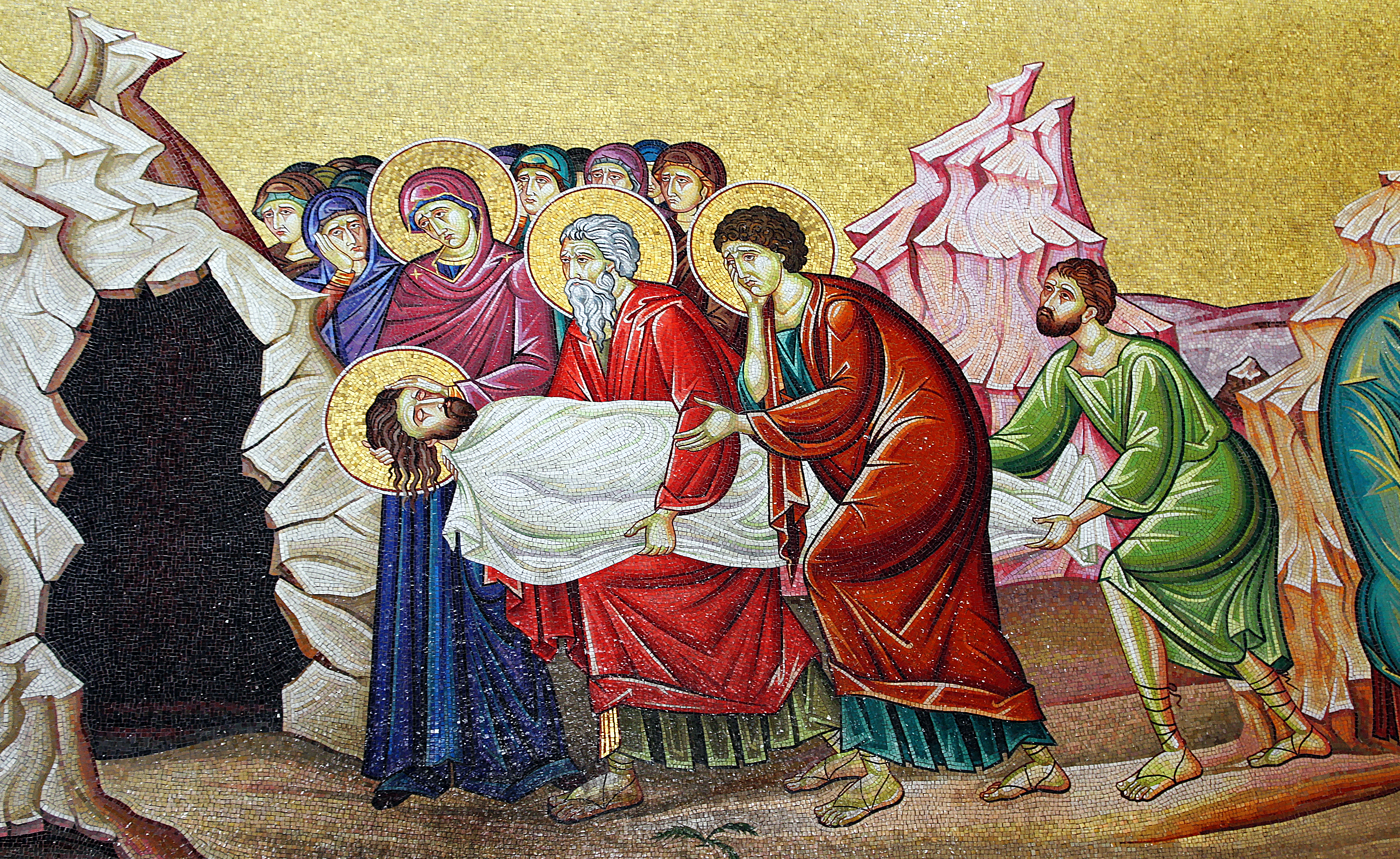
Wall mosaic of the entombment of Christ near the Stone of Unction at the Church of the Holy Sepulchre

References to 'Sindon' cloth can also be found in both the Bible and ancient Greek literature. According to Christian tradition, Sindon cloth was used to shroud the body of Jesus. The Shroud of Turin, which is purported to be Jesus's burial shroud, is a rectangular piece of sindon fabric that measures approximately 4.36 metres (14.3 ft) in length and 1.1 metres (3 ft 7 in) in width. It displays a faint, sepia-toned image of a man's front and back, with wounds consistent with crucifixion.

Aldred the Glossator, a 10th-century priest, offered an explanation for the term "sindon" (i.e., "shroud" or "fine linen cloth"), but he provided this clarification specifically where the word is used to refer to the burial shroud of Jesus in passages such as MtGl(Li) 27.59, MkGl(Li) 15.46, and LkGl(Li) 23.53. Sindon cloth was considered sacred and had multiple uses, such as being used to cover the pyx. Prominent historical relics in Suffolk include the 'Sindon cloth', used to cover the pyx containing the reserved Blessed Sacrament, and the 'burse', a case designed for the corporal upon which the Host is placed during Mass. Both of these items originated from the Hessett church in Suffolk and are currently on loan to the British Museum.

== See also ==
- Burial of Jesus
- History of the Shroud of Turin
- India (Bible) – India in biblical geography
- Christianity in the ante-Nicene period
- Acheiropoieta
- Church tabernacle
- Matthew 27:59
