= Matthew 27:60 =

- ← 27:59 27:61 →
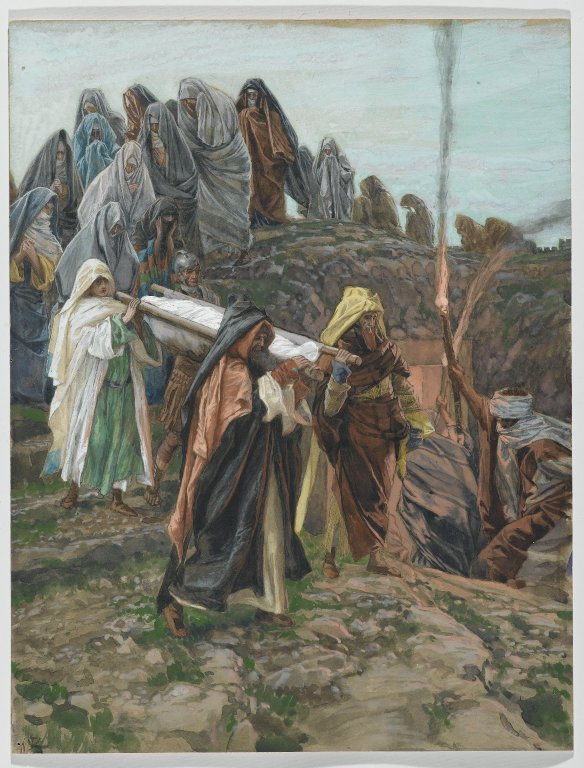
- James Tissot's Jesus Carried to the Tomb, painted between 1886 and 1894
- Book: Gospel of Matthew
- Christian Bible part: New Testament

Matthew 27:60 is the sixtieth verse of the twenty-seventh chapter of the Gospel of Matthew in the New Testament. This verse describes the Entombment of Jesus by Joseph of Arimathea after the crucifixion.

== Content ==
The original Koine Greek, according to Westcott and Hort, reads:

και εθηκεν αυτο εν τω καινω αυτου μνημειω ο ελατομησεν εν τη
πετρα και προσκυλισας λιθον μεγαν τη θυρα του μνημειου απηλθεν

In the King James Version of the Bible it is translated as:

And laid it in his own new tomb, which he had hewn out in the rock: and
he rolled a great stone to the door of the sepulchre, and departed.

The modern World English Bible translates the passage as:

and laid it in his own new tomb, which he had cut out in the rock,
and he rolled a great stone to the door of the tomb, and departed.

For a collection of other versions see BibleHub Matthew 27:60

== Analysis ==
Joseph of Arimathea places Jesus in his own new tomb, a sign of great loyalty by Joseph. This verse is based on Mark 15:46, and is paralleled by Luke 23:53 and John 19:41. Matthew is the only gospel writer to mention that it was Joseph's own tomb that Jesus was placed. Typically wealthy residents of Jerusalem would have a large family tomb, with space for many burials. The new tomb implies that no one has yet been entombed there, something made explicit in both Luke and John. Mentioning the newness, and emptiness, of the tomb may also be part of the body of evidence Matthew presents for the truth of the resurrection. A new tomb with only one body would prevent any confusion. Davies and Allison note that reference to the newness of the tomb might also be an allusion to the newness that emerges from it with the resurrection. The newness of the tomb may also reflect that Joseph's wealth is new found, or that his family is newly arrived in Jerusalem. This could explain why he has a tomb in Jerusalem rather than his native Arimathea.

The description of the rock hewn tomb is fully in keeping with archeological evidence from the period. Jerusalem was surrounded by soft limestone rock that was perforated by natural and artificial caves, creating a giant natural cemetery. The door also matches examples from this period. Most tombs would have a smaller stone able to keep out animals. More expensive tombs would have a stone large enough to keep out grave robbers. This and other verses make clear that a larger stone is in place.

Joseph departs, not to be seen again in Matthew's narrative. Davies and Allison note that Matthew frequently treats his minor characters in this manner, giving no unnecessary details. Joseph leaving is in the next verses contrasted with the women who remain and the guards who later arrive. His departure is not mentioned in any of the other gospels, but Matthew adds the story of the guards arriving, so that could explain adding a mention of Joseph leaving.

| Preceded by Matthew 27:59 | Gospel of Matthew; Chapter 27 | Succeeded by Matthew 27:61 |
