= Preparation day =

Preparation day may refer to:

- a day of rest in the life of a missionary of the Church of Jesus Christ of Latter-day Saints
- the day before the Jewish Sabbath
- the day on which Jesus was buried after his crucifixion
