= Matthew 27:61 =

- ← 27:60 27:62 →
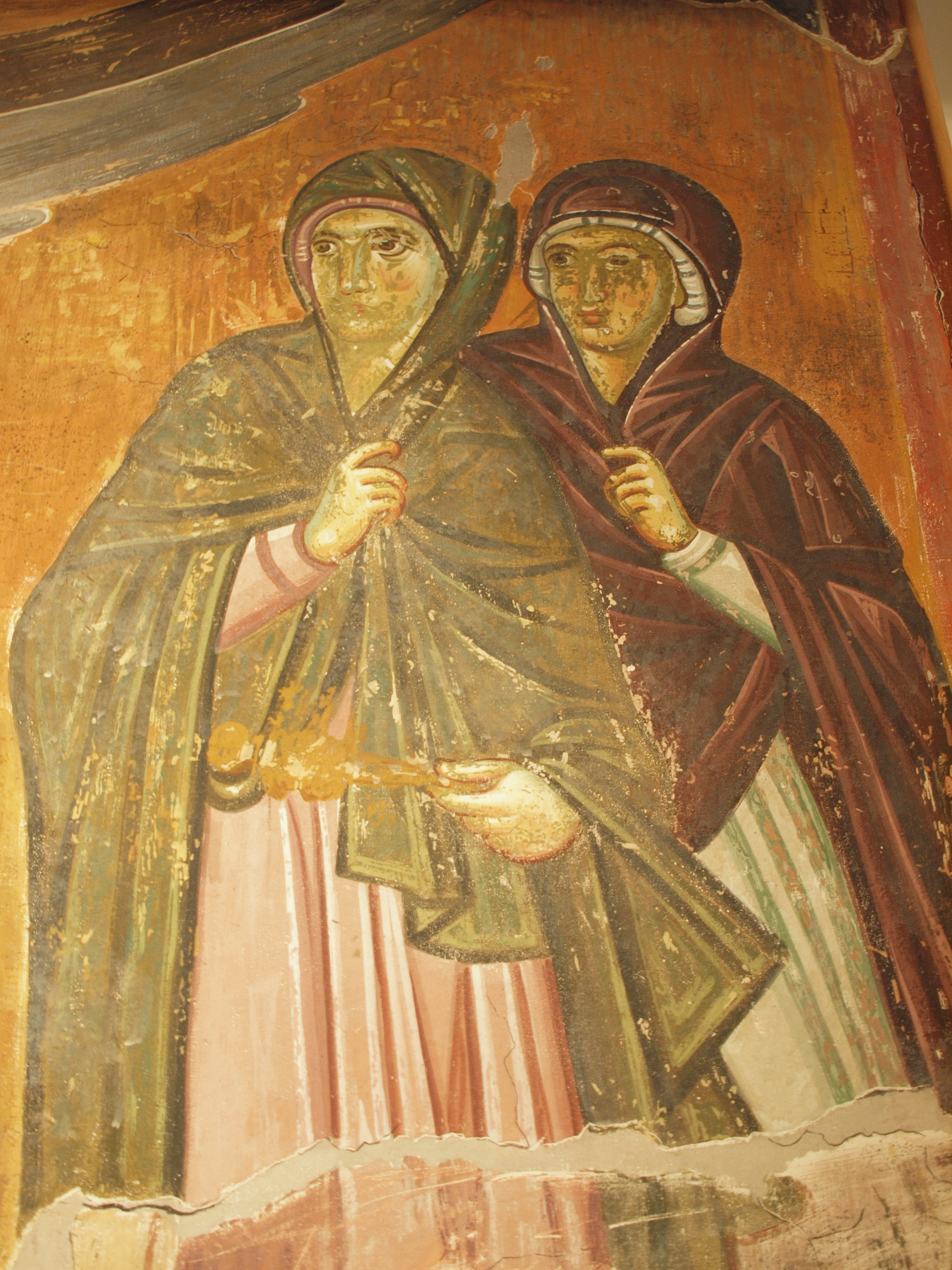
- "Women at the tomb". Mileševa Monastery
- Book: Gospel of Matthew
- Christian Bible part: New Testament

Matthew 27:61 is the sixty-first verse of the twenty-seventh chapter of the Gospel of Matthew in the New Testament. This verse describes two women waiting by the Tomb of Jesus after the crucifixion.

== Content ==
The original Koine Greek, according to Westcott and Hort, reads:

ην δε εκει μαριαμ η μαγδαληνη και η αλλη μαρια καθημεναι απεναντι του ταφου

In the King James Version of the Bible it is translated as:

And there was Mary Magdalene, and the other Mary, sitting over against the sepulchre.

The modern World English Bible translates the passage as:

Mary Magdalene was there, and the other Mary, sitting opposite the tomb.

For a collection of other versions see BibleHub Matthew 27:61.

== Analysis ==
The tense of this verse specifically contrasts it with the previous one. In that verse Joseph of Arimathea leaves after supervising the burial of Jesus. In contrast the two Marys stay. There is no mention of the women leaving, but they presumably do so prior to the sabbath, and also prior to the arrival of the guards that are dispatched in the next verses.

Mary Magdalene and "the other Mary" who is presumed to be "Mary the mother of James and Joses, and the mother of the sons of Zebedee" mentioned at Matthew 27:57. In some traditions the second Mary is considered to be the same person as Salome. Matthew has these two women present for the crucifixion, the entombment, and the resurrection. By specifically mentioning these women at all three events the author of Matthew presents a set of witnesses to the entire passion narrative. This serves an apologetic purpose, evidence that the resurrection was not a matter of confusion. By having the women present at the entombment, there is not possibility that they could confuse tombs when the same women return at Matthew 28:1. That the text so clearly strives to make such a story impossible, is evidence that similar allegations were likely circulating at the time the gospel was written. Craig S. Keener considers it unlikely that the loyalty of the women is purely apologetic. Women witnesses were given less weight than male ones in that era. Moreover, a group of Passionate female followers could have clear scandalous undertones, and in Keener's view would not have been invented for that reason. Matthew 27:55 mentions that many women were at the crucifixion, but now only two appear. The rest of the women may have fled in the same manner as the disciples.

This verse is based on Mark 15:47, and paralleled by Luke 23:55.

Preceded by Matthew 27:60	Gospel of Matthew; Chapter 27	Succeeded by Matthew 27:62
