= Matthew 27:55–56 =

Matthew 27:55-56
- ← 27:54 27:57 →
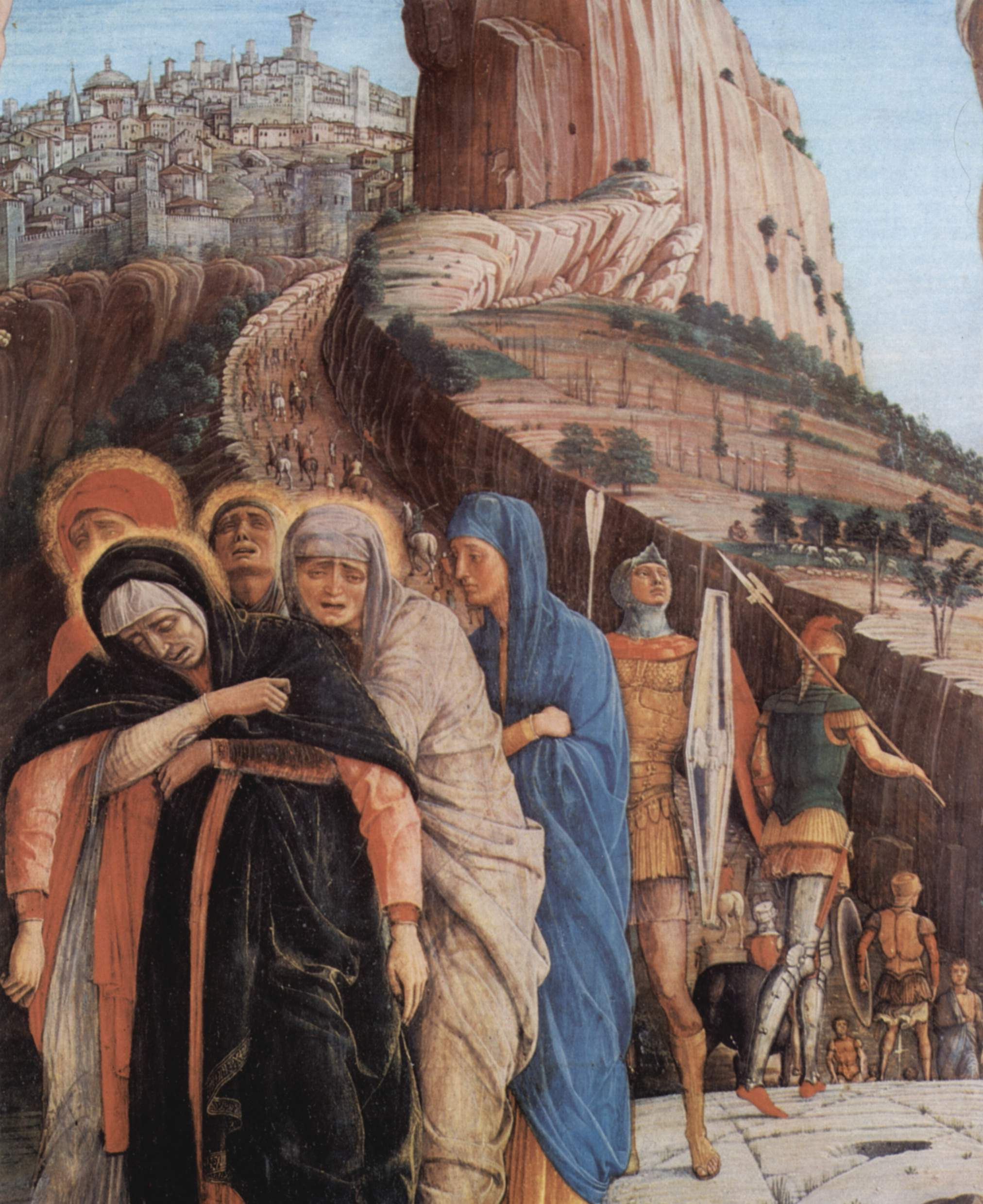
- Andrea Mantegna's 1459 depiction of the women at the crucifixion.
- Book: Gospel of Matthew
- Christian Bible part: New Testament

Matthew 27:55–56 are the fifty-sixth and fifty-seventh verses of the twenty-seventh chapter of the Gospel of Matthew in the New Testament. The crucifixion and death of Jesus have just occurred, and these verses make note of a group of women who were present at that event.

== Text ==
The original Koine Greek, according to Westcott and Hort, reads:

55: ησαν δε εκει γυναικες πολλαι απο μακροθεν θεωρουσαι αιτινες
ηκολουθησαν τω ιησου απο της γαλιλαιας διακονουσαι αυτω
56: εν αις ην μαρια η μαγδαληνη και μαρια η του ιακωβου
και ιωσηφ μητηρ και η μητηρ των υιων ζεβεδαιου

In the King James Version of the Bible it is translated as:

55: And many women were there beholding afar off, which
followed Jesus from Galilee, ministering unto him:
56: Among which was Mary Magdalene, and Mary the mother of
James and Joses, and the mother of Zebedees children.

The modern World English Bible translates the passage as:

55: Many women were there watching from afar, who
had followed Jesus from Galilee, serving him.
56: Among them were Mary Magdalene, Mary the mother of James
and Joses, and the mother of the sons of Zebedee.

For a collection of other versions see BibleHub Matthew 27:55

== Role of the women ==
These verses introduce a group of women, two of whom will be the central witnesses to the events of Jesus' death, burial, and resurrection. The women followers of Jesus have been little mentioned in Matthew up to this point. Keener notes that the very mention of a religious leader with female followers could have been considered scandalous in this era. It was traditional for female relatives to gather around and mourn at an execution. It was very rare to execute women, so while the disciples have fled in fear of the authorities, the female followers of Jesus could expect to be free from danger.

The act of serving occurs several times in Matthew, by angels at 4:11, by a female follower at 8:15, by Jesus at 20:28, and by townsfolk towards Jesus at 25:44. It refers to "practical, domestic" serving in this verse.

These verses are based on Mark 15:40 and 41, with several alterations. Matthew adds the word many to the opening line, moving it from towards the end of Mark 15:41. 27:55 is also paralleled by Luke 23:49, but Luke does not make mention of any specific women being present.

== Identity of the women ==
=== Mary Magdalene ===
This is the first mention of Mary Magdalene in Matthew. She will play a leading role in the events of the resurrection, but the gospel gives no details about her. Luke is the only gospel to mention her before the crucifixion, with Luke 8:2 stating that she had 7 demons driven out of her, and was now one of the followers of Jesus. In Roman Catholic Churches a tradition developed equating Magdalene with Mary of Bethany, but most scholars do not feel there is textual evidence to support this.

=== Mary, mother of James ===
The second Mary mentioned, also generates much debate. She appears twice more in the resurrection narrative at Matthew 27:61 and 28:1. In those later verses she is referred to as "the other Mary." Which James she is the mother of is the centre of the debate. There have been three men affiliated to Jesus named James mentioned so far in Matthew. James the Great, one of Jesus' primary disciples mentioned regularly in Matthew; James, son of Alphaeus, another disciple mentioned at Matthew 10:3; and James, brother of Jesus, who is mentioned at Matthew 13:55. This Mary is clearly not mother to James the Great, his brother is John, not Joses. The version of this verse at Mark 15:40 makes this explicit, noting that this Mary is the mother of James the Less.

If the James being mentioned here is James, the brother of Jesus that implies that the Mary mentioned here is Mary, the mother of Jesus. (Though such an interpretation is rejected by Catholics and others who support the perpetual virginity of Mary, who understand the word "brother" to mean a less direct relationship). Matthew 13:55 mentions that James has a brother named Joses, and the close parallel between these two verses is the primary evidence for this Mary being Jesus' mother. John 19:25 mentions that Jesus' mother was present at the crucifixion, and thus could be being referred to by Matthew in this verse. Mary, James, and Joses (Joseph) were all very common names in the period, and it is thus quite possible that there was another family sharing these same names. The title of "James the Less" indicates that this James was part of Jesus' disciple group, and France considers it unlikely that James, the brother of Jesus, was a member of the group. France also considers it unlikely that the author of Matthew would use such terminology to describe the mother of Jesus, that she would get more prominence than simply being referred to as "the other Mary."

Most scholars and Christian denominations thus do not believe that the Mary in this verse is the mother of Jesus. If this Mary is not mother of James the Great, or James, brother of Jesus, then she may be the mother of James, son of Alphaeus, or this James may be a new person entirely. In most Christian traditions this James is considered to be the James, son of Alphaeus, and he and James the Less are considered the same person. John 19:25 also mentions that Mary of Clopas was present at these events, so this Mary is often believed to be her.

=== Mother of the sons of Zebedee ===
Zebedee is the father of the Apostles James the Great and John, he appeared earlier in the gospel at Matthew 4:21. Zebedee's wife also appears at Matthew 20:20, but also goes unnamed in that verse. At Mark 15:40 the third woman in the list is Salome. Tradition is that Matthew and Mark are referring to the same person, and thus Zebedee's wife is named Salome. It is also possible that the author of Matthew substituted Salome in the list with a figure better known to him. Unlike Mark and Luke, this third woman is dropped from the rest of the resurrection story, and Matthew only has two women go to the tombs. Gundry feels that the replacement of Salome by the wife of Zebedee explains why Matthew dropped "the less" from the mention of James, as the previous James was now clearly distinguished from James the Great.

Preceded by Matthew 27:54	Gospel of Matthew; Chapter 27	Succeeded by Matthew 27:57
