= Matthew 27:58 =

- ← 27:57 27:59 →
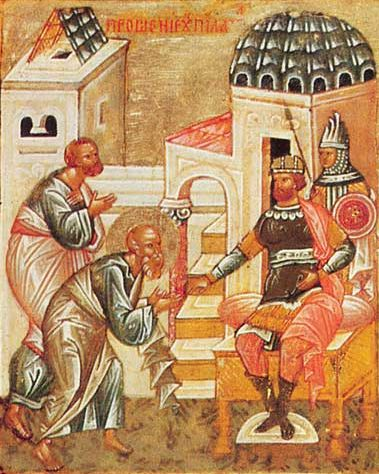
- A medieval depiction of Joseph asking for the body of Christ from Pilate
- Book: Gospel of Matthew
- Christian Bible part: New Testament

Matthew 27:58 is the fifty-eighth verse of the twenty-seventh chapter of the Gospel of Matthew in the New Testament. This verse describes Joseph of Arimathea meeting with Pontius Pilate to secure the burial of Jesus.

== Content ==
The original Koine Greek, according to Westcott and Hort, reads:

ουτος προσελθων τω πιλατω ητησατο το σωμα
του ιησου τοτε ο πιλατος εκελευσεν αποδοθηναι

In the King James Version of the Bible it is translated as:

He went to Pilate, and begged the body of Jesus.
Then Pilate commanded the body to be delivered.

The modern World English Bible translates the passage as:

This man went to Pilate, and asked for Jesus' body.
Then Pilate commanded the body to be given up.

For a collection of other versions see BibleHub Matthew 27:58

== Analysis ==
These same events are related by Mark 15:43–45, Luke 23:52, and John 19:38. Mark has some more details, noting that it was "bold" of Joseph to approach Pilate, and also has Pilate exclaiming on how quickly Jesus died. Matthew, Luke, and John do not have these details. Gundry notes that at the time Mark was written the question posed by skeptics was whether Jesus really was dead. By the time Matthew was written this had faded as an issue, to be replaced by the allegation that the disciples had stolen Jesus' body. Thus Matthew drops the sections emphasizing that Jesus was truly dead, and adds much evidence that the body could not have been stolen. There is also a much longer version of this scene found in the non-canonical Gospel of Peter that explains the special access by claiming that Joseph was a friend of Pilate. The Gospel of Peter version also puts the blame for Jesus' death more clearly on the Jewish leaders than on Pilate.

Approaching Pilate was a bold move, it would publicly associate Joseph with a criminal executed for defying the empire. France notes that this is somewhat explained by Matthew's presentation of Pilate as being ambivalent towards the execution, with the true driving force being the Jewish leaders.

Roman law and tradition was to leave the bodies of executed criminals to decompose upon the cross. This violated Jewish custom that all bodies be buried by sundown on the same day. There is evidence that Roman governors of Palestine did regularly compromise the rules to allow the bodies of Jewish criminals to be buried according to custom. Contemporary sources make special note of cases where this exception was not allowed. Typically the body would have been handed over to the Jewish authorities, who would have buried it in a mass grave set aside for criminals. There are contemporary records of bodies being handed over to other individuals, so these events are not impossible.

Keener notes that proper burials were not just part of Jewish tradition. Greco-Roman literature of the period has several examples of noble heroes taking great risks to ensure a proper burial.

| Preceded by Matthew 27:57 | Gospel of Matthew; Chapter 27 | Succeeded by Matthew 27:59 |
