= India (Bible) =

India in biblical geography

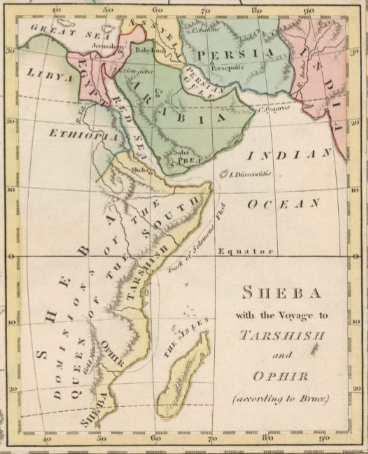
The Dominions of Solomon and his Allies: Sheba with the Voyage to Tarshish and Ophir by Robert Wilkinson (1798)

In biblical geography, India is described as bordering the Achaemenid Persian Empire under Ahasuerus (Xerxes I), as referenced in the Book of Esther (Esther 1:1 and Esther 8:9). 1 Maccabees, which is located in the Deuterocanonon/Aprocrypha, references "the Indian mahouts of Antichus's war elephants [second century B.C.]" (1 Maccabees 6:37). Archaeological findings in the cities of Sumer, including Kish, Lagash, and Ur, confirm trade between India and Mesopatamia. For example, ivory objects crafted in India have been found in Mesopotamia.

1 Kings 9:28 discusses the navy of King Solomon sailing to Ophir ("Sopheir" and "Sophara" in the LXX), with the word Sophir meaning India in Coptic; as gold was plentiful in India, "it is generally accepted that Ophir was a port in India". 1 Kings 10:22 mentions "gold, silver, ivory, apes, and peacocks" brought by the navy of King Solomon and King Hiram to Israel. In the Old Testament, the word for peacock tuki, the word for ivory shen habbim, and the word for ape kof are likely "derived from their Indian counterparts tokei (feather in Tamil), ab, and kapi, respectively." Proverbs 7:17, Psalms 45:8, and Song of Solomon 4:14 reference the Indian fragrant wood aloes, which in the Hebrew is ahalim, being derived from the Sanskrit agaru. Contemporary Babylonian texts use the word sindhu (meaning "Indian") for linen, as with Greek texts that use the word sindon for the same. The term Hodu in Esther 1:1 is a biblical name of India, which is derived from the word Hindu, referring to the inhabitants of the Sindhu River of the Indo-Gangetic Plain.

The Cyclopædia of Biblical, Theological and Ecclesiastical Literature states, with respect to Indian Jews being presented at Pentecost:

It is also with some reason conceived that in the list of foreign Jews present at the Pentecost (Ac 2:9) we should read Ι᾿νδίαν, India, and not Ι᾿ουδαίαν, Judaea; but the still more probable reading is Ι᾿δουμαίαν, Idumaea, if indeed the common reading ought to be changed at all (see Kuinol, Conmment. ad loc.). The Hebrew form "Hoddu" is an abbreviation of Honadu, which is identical with the indigenous names of the river Indus, "Hindu," or "Sindhu," and again with the ancient name of the country as it appears in the Vendidad, "Hapta Hendu." The native form "Sindus" is noticed by Pliny (vi, 23).

According to Gerald Flurry, the context of Ezekiel 38:5, the descendants of Cush and Phut are found in India and what is now Pakistan. To this end, "the Syriac, Chaldee, and Arabic versions frequently render that term [Cush] by India or Indians, as in 2Ch 21:16; Isa 11:11; Isa 18:1; Jer 13:23; Zep 3:10."

== See also ==
- List of biblical places
- Gymnosophists, referenced in the writings of the early Church Fathers
- India (Herodotus)
- Names for India
