= Matthew 27:59 =

- ← 27:58 27:60 →
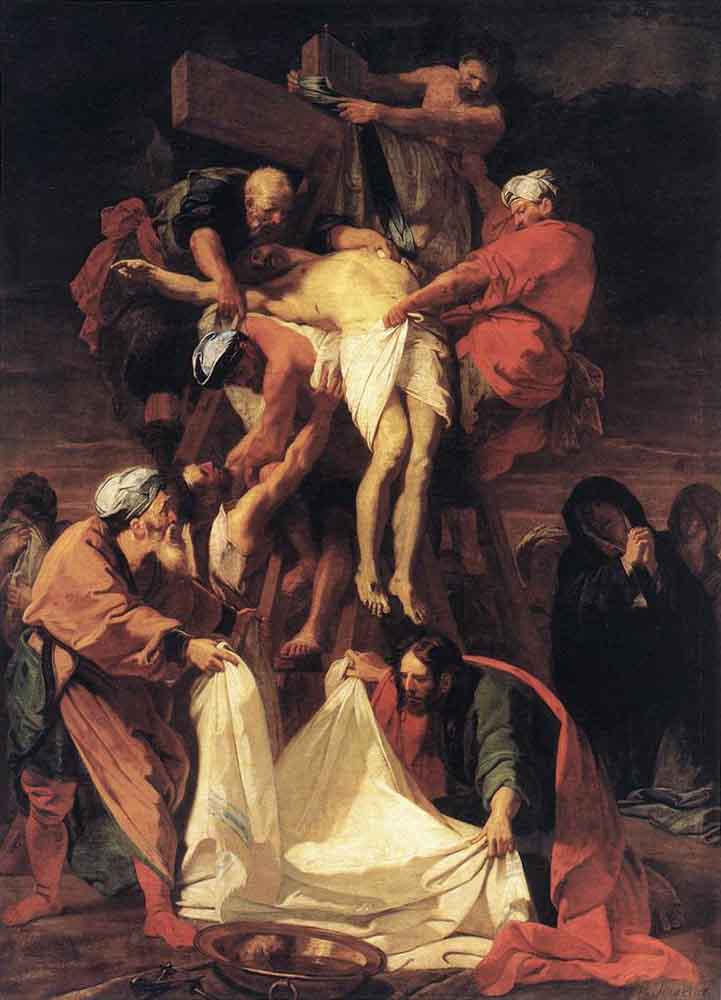
- Jean Jouvenet's Descent From The Cross, 1697
- Book: Gospel of Matthew
- Christian Bible part: New Testament

Matthew 27:59 is the fifty-ninth verse of the twenty-seventh chapter of the Gospel of Matthew in the New Testament. This verse describes Joseph of Arimathea gathering Jesus' body after the crucifixion.

== Content ==
The original Koine Greek, according to Westcott and Hort, reads:

και λαβων το σωμα ο ιωσηφ ενετυλιξεν αυτο [εν] σινδονι καθαρα

In the King James Version of the Bible it is translated as:

And when Joseph had taken the body, he wrapped it in a clean linen cloth,

The modern World English Bible translates the passage as:

Joseph took the body, and wrapped it in a clean linen cloth,

For a collection of other versions see BibleHub Matthew 27:59

== Analysis ==
In the previous verse Joseph obtained permission from Pontius Pilate to give the body of Jesus a proper burial, and in this verse he collects Jesus from the cross. In art, taking the body of Jesus is an event known as the Descent from the Cross, and has been the subject of many paintings and works of art. Matthew gives few details about this event. Matthew does not mention the figure of Nicodemus, who helps Joseph in the Gospel of John. Taking Jesus down from the cross would have been the work of more than one person. Brown believes that this verse implies that the body was taken down by the Romans and delivered to Joseph.

This verse is a modification of material found at Mark 15:46, and is paralleled by Luke 23:53 and John 19:40. Matthew adds a mention of the linen being "clean" one of four places in his gospel that the author of Matthew adds a mention of cleanliness. Unlike other gospels, Matthew does not mention any anointing of Jesus' body. Perhaps the events of Matthew 26:12 are considered by the gospel writer to be sufficient anointment.

Joseph wraps the body in cloth, covering Jesus' nakedness that was the result of Matthew 27:35. The word translated as 'cloth' is sindon. It refers to one large piece of cloth, and can also be translated as shroud. The Shroud of Turin has been claimed to preserve this cloth. The cloth is described differently at John 19:40 where the word othonia is used. That word is understood to mean a tightly wrapped collection of smaller cloths, and thus presents a different vision of Jesus' burial garb, but France notes that the term isn't very specific.

Preceded by Matthew 27:58	Gospel of Matthew; Chapter 27	Succeeded by Matthew 27:60
