= Matthew 27:57 =

- ← 27:56 27:58 →
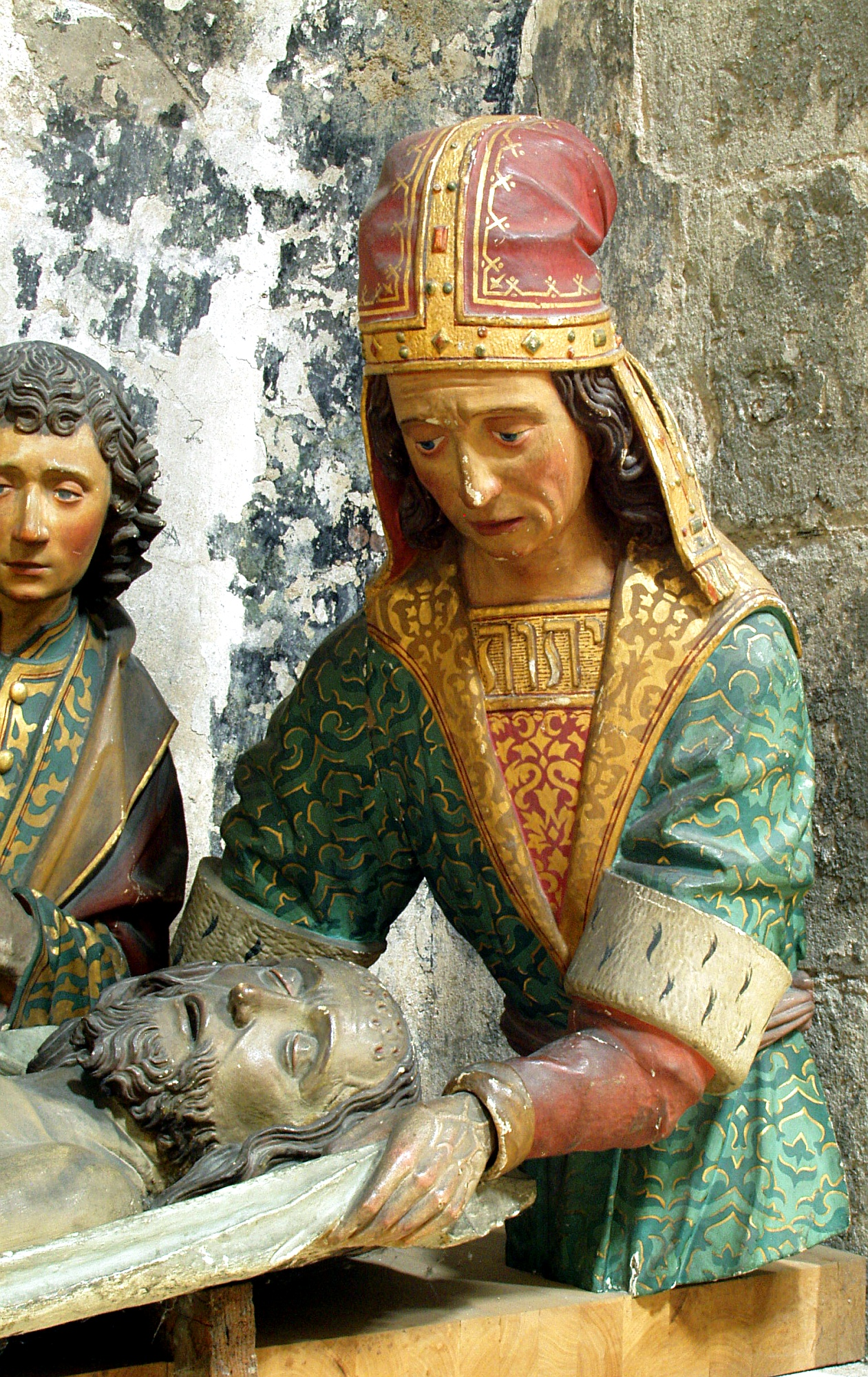
- A medieval sculpture of Joseph of Arimathea in Cologne. His costume serves to illustrate his wealth
- Book: Gospel of Matthew
- Christian Bible part: New Testament

Matthew 27:57 is the fifty-seventh verse of the twenty-seventh chapter of the Gospel of Matthew in the New Testament. This verse begins a discussion of the burial of Jesus and introduces Joseph of Arimathea.

== Content ==
The original Koine Greek, according to Westcott and Hort, reads:

οψιας δε γενομενης ηλθεν ανθρωπος πλουσιος απο αριμαθαιας
τουνομα ιωσηφ ος και αυτος εμαθητευθη τω ιησου

In the King James Version of the Bible it is translated as:

When the even was come, there came a rich man of Arimathaea,
named Joseph, who also himself was Jesus' disciple:

The modern World English Bible translates the passage as:

When evening had come, a rich man from Arimathaea, named
Joseph, who himself was also Jesus’ disciple came.

For a collection of other versions see BibleHub Matthew 27:57

=== Analysis ===
The verse makes note that these events happened that same evening, the last of a series of chronological notes Matthew adds to the crucifixion narrative. Purchasing burial clothes and anointments, as well as the burial itself, would have been impossible on Sabbath. Jesus died at the ninth hour, or 3:00pm, Jesus' disciples would thus have had to work rapidly to have the burial complete by the start of Sabbath at sundown. France notes that Joseph may have started his preparations, including the meeting with Pilate, before the crucifixion.

This verse introduces Joseph of Arimathea, who is found in all four gospels. None of them give many details about this figure, but in later years extensive legends about who he was have developed. Kenner notes that other scholars have noticed a parallel between Joseph here appearing to protect Jesus' body, just as Joseph, the husband of Mary, protected the infant Jesus in Matthew 2. Keener does not place much weight on this parallelism. In the other gospels Joseph does not play much of a role in the infancy narrative, but Joseph of Arimathea still appears. Joseph was also a very common name at the time. The historicity of Joseph's role in Jesus' burial is debated among scholars. He is not mentioned outside the gospels, and Acts 13:29 can be read to imply that Jesus was buried by the governing forces. Other than Joseph, no disciples are mentioned in the burial narrative.

Matthew's introduction of Joseph of Arimathea is distinct from the other gospels. Mark 15:43 describes him as "searching for the kingdom of God." Matthew elevates him to a full disciple, perhaps the author's interpretation of Mark's statement. Matthew drops any mention of Joseph's being part of the ruling Sanhedrin, thus also avoiding the issues the other gospel writers have with reports that the Sanhedrin universally condemned Jesus. No information is given on how Joseph became a disciple. The identity of Arimathea is no longer known, but Joseph's ownership of a tomb makes clear he is from the Jerusalem area. Luke 23:51 unambiguously states that Arimathea was a "city in Judea." Matthew, as well as Mark and Luke, make no mention of Jesus preaching outside of Galilee before this final week, and imply that this was Jesus' first attempt to minister in Jerusalem. To France this is evidence for the synoptics having a simplified narrative of Jesus' ministry. The Gospel of John does mention an earlier trip to the south, that could explain converts in this region. Davies and Allison mention that being buried by a disciple may be a link to John the Baptist, who was also buried by his disciples at Matthew 14:12.

Matthew is the only gospel writer to describe Joseph as a "rich man" a depiction that has become central to Joseph's depictions in later art and culture. Owning such a tomb outside of the city would have been a luxury item in this era, and Harrington speculates that the author of Matthew extrapolates Joseph's wealth from that fact.

Considering the many Old Testament references in Matthew, the mention of wealth could also be a reference to Isaiah 53:9, which describes the messiah's grave as being "with a rich man." Davies and Allison not that Isaiah also mentions that "they made his grave with the wicked," which is not connected to Matthew's narrative. This reduces the chance that this verse is a reference to Isaiah, though Matthew's Old Testament references are often very loose. Gundry notes that modern scholars today doubt that "rich man" was in the original version of Isaiah 53:9, but it would have been in the version the author of Matthew was using so that does not affect this verse. France also notes that the mention of Joseph's wealth can serve to counter the strong condemnation of the wealthy in Matthew 19.

Preceded by Matthew 27:56	Gospel of Matthew; Chapter 27	Succeeded by Matthew 27:58
