= Abbey of Sainte-Marie-au-Bois =

Catholic abbey in France

Coordinates: 48°57′21″N 5°57′46″E

Abbey de Sainte-Marie-au-Bois
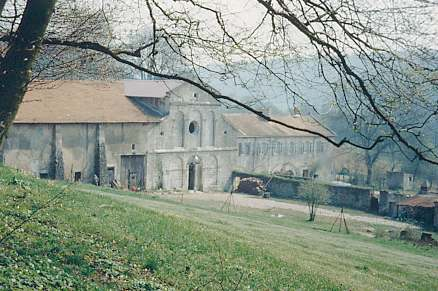

Religion
- Affiliation: Catholic Church
- District: Vilcey-sur-Trey
- Province: Meurthe-et-Moselle
- Region: Lorraine

Location
- Country: France
- Interactive map of Abbey de Sainte-Marie-au-Bois

Architecture
- Style: Romanesque
- Completed: XVI Century

Sainte-Marie-au-Bois is a former abbey of the Premonstratensians order, located in the commune of Vilcey-sur-Trey, Meurthe-et-Moselle, France, built near a spring at the bottom of a small valley where a tributary of the Trey flows. Long considered the oldest settlement of the Premonstratensians order in Lorraine, its abbot in the early 17th century was Servais de Lairuelz, who led the reform of his order, first in Lorraine and then beyond. At the start of the First World War, French writer and poet Charles Péguy stayed at the former abbey, now a farm. Today, its remarkable remains make Sainte-Marie-au-Bois a rare architectural reminder of the Prémontré order in the 12th century.

== History ==
=== Foundation in 12th century ===
The abbey was founded by Duke Simon I of Lorraine between 1130 and 1139, close to his castle at Prény. The valley where the monastery was built, as well as farmland, vineyards, mills and forests, were granted by the opulent Messinian abbeys of Saint-Pierre-aux-Nonnains and Sainte-Glossinde. The local lords also made donations.

Richard, a disciple of St. Norbert from Lorraine, became the first abbot, coming from Laon.

A certain mystery surrounds the founding of this abbey: a tradition reported by Dom Calmet and Charles-Louis Hugo makes Sainte-Marie-au-Bois the first foundation of the Prémontré order in Lorraine. Saint Norbert himself, during a stopover at the Château de Prény, and Duke Simon, are said to have agreed to found this monastery in 1126. Today's historians, however, refute this legend. It was during a council held in Liège in 1131, attended by Saint Norbert, Saint Bernard and a number of lay lords, that Duke Simon conceived the idea of two foundations, one at Sturzelbronn and the other near Prény.

The monastery was given the name "Sancta Maria in Nemore" (Saint Mary in the Woods) and placed under the invocation of the Virgin Mary in her Annunciation. The buildings were completed shortly after 1150.

A monastery of nuns was also built close to the abbey, a common feature of Pre-Monstratensian foundations in the 17th century; this establishment subsequently disappeared. In the 18th century, Dom Calmet reported that the remains of this monastery can still be seen at a place called "la Celle-des-Dames". Its chapel was dedicated to Mary Magdalene. Recent surveys in the forests surrounding the abbey have uncovered a medieval parcel of land covering more than twenty hectares, characterized by scree slopes, terraces and boundary markers, reminding us that Sainte-Marie-au-Bois is a clearing abbey.

=== Middle Ages ===
The Premonstratensian fathers of Sainte-Marie-au-Bois, dividing their time between contemplative life and ministry, served the parishes of Vilcey-sur-Trey, Viéville-en-Haye, Pagny-sur-Moselle, Onville and even further afield, Manonville, Hagéville, Bey-sur-Seille and Lanfroicourt. In 1257, they founded the Saint-Nicaise seminary in Pont-à-Mousson, to train novices from Sainte-Marie and other Premonstratensian establishments in Lorraine. In July of the same year, Jacquin de Vic sold a mill in Bouxières-sous-Amance to the Premonstratensian abbey of Sainte-Marie-aux-Bois.

Sainte-Marie-aux-Bois, under the protection of the Dukes of Lorraine and so close to their Château de Prény, was devastated on several occasions. As early as the end of the 13th century, the abbey suffered damage during the siege of the Prény fortress by Theobald II, Count of Bar. A few years later, in 1324, it was the turn of the Metz to plunder the abbey and the surrounding ducal lands.

A century later, in 1427, the same Messins returned and once again pillaged and expelled the monks who had taken refuge in Saint-Mihiel. In 1439, war raged once again: a Gascony party, allied to the Lorrains, which had taken refuge in the abbey, was brutally dislodged by Messins' men-at-arms, and in the same year, the troops of Antoine, Count of Vaudémont, ravaged the region once again.

On December 13, 1473, Charles the Bold, Duke of Burgundy, whose troops occupied the duchies of Lorraine and Bar, was a guest of Abbé Jean de Dieulouard and stayed at the abbey.

=== Sixteenth century ===
The 16th century was a time of prosperity for Sainte-Marie-au-Bois. In 1504, Abbot Pierre de Prény granted land and forests to enable the repopulation and reconstruction of the village of Viéville-en-Haye, which had been deserted since the wars of the 15th century. It was also at this time that the abbey church was renovated. Around mid-century, however, Protestants devastated the monastery.

Three members of the Thuillier family succeeded each other as abbot. Nicolas Thuillier, who was entrusted with the general vicariate of several circaries, was also appointed State Councillor by Duke Antoine, and became confessor to Duchess Philippe de Gueldre, widow of René II, who had retired to the Poor Clares of Pont-à-Mousson. A book of hours given to his confessor by the duchess is now kept at the Pont-à-Mousson municipal library.

The successor to the three Thuilier abbots, Didier Malhusson, a favorite of Duke Charles III, was imposed by force. Abbot commendatory, he did not reside at the abbey, but in a neighboring estate, the Grange-en-Haye, transformed into a pleasure house. During his abbatiate, monastic life became even more disordered. At Sainte-Marie-au-Bois, as in other Premonstratensian abbeys of the same period, slackness reached its peak.

Abbé Daniel Picart, who succeeds Didier Malhusson, is only twenty-seven years old at the time of his election. The canons chose him young, thinking he would have less authority. However, the young abbot had been trained at the Jesuit university in Pont-à-Mousson, and showed a strong desire for reform. Seeing his determination to restore the monastic precepts, his opponents had no choice but to poison him with poisonous spiders introduced into his soup.

=== Seventeenth century ===
Abbot Picart's successor, Servais de Lairuelz, was also committed to Tridentine ideas and wanted a return to the old rigor. In 1608, he transferred the monks to the new abbey of Sainte-Marie-Majeure in Pont-à-Mousson, to bring them closer to the young, dynamic university administered by the Jesuits. Pope Paul V agreed, on condition that one or two canons would reside permanently in the old abbey and celebrate mass there every day. In a way, this was the twilight of Sainte-Marie-au-Bois, where, apart from the two aforementioned monks, the only other resident was a farmer in charge of running the agricultural estate.

In 1631, however, the monks returned to the ancient abbey to escape a plague epidemic in Pont-à-Mousson, where Abbot Servais de Lairuelz died on October 18, 1631.

Duke Charles IV of Lorraine, an intriguing and politically awkward young man, lends his support to Duke Gaston d'Orléans, younger brother, heir and opponent of King Louis XIII of France, going so far as to grant the rebellious prince, who has taken refuge in Nancy, the hand of his sister Marguerite of Lorraine. The King of France immediately reacted by having his troops occupy the duchies. Lorraine and the Barrois were dragged unwillingly into the Thirty Years' War, which set Europe on fire.

The year 1635 is infamously known as "L'année des Suédois". The troops of the Protestant Scandinavian king ravaged the duchies. The abbey was not spared.

=== Eighteenth and nineteenth centuries ===
During the French Revolution, the Prémontré order was stripped of its assets, and the buildings and lands of Sainte-Marie-au-Bois, which had become bien nationaux, were put up for sale on February 14, 1791, to Antoine Willemin, a judge in Pont-à-Mousson, for 15,400 livres.

Throughout the 19th century, the former abbey underwent a succession of owners and tenants. The abbey church was converted into a stable and the chapter house into a kitchen. During this period, a fragment of a 14th-century altarpiece was donated to the Musée historique lorrain in Nancy.

=== Twentieth century ===
In August 1914, the fortunes of war brought writer Charles Péguy to Sainte-Marie-au-Bois; his platoon occupied the site from August 18 to 23, 1914, and carried out reconnaissance towards the border, then located along the Moselle. Here's what Lieutenant Péguy wrote on the back of postcards sent to his family and friends:

"Everything's going well, admirable health, life in the open air, billeted in a large rectangular farmhouse in the middle of the woods, we've had no news from the world for four days".

"We're in a small post, a grand'garde in the middle of the woods: the grand'garde Sainte-Marie".

"We live in a kind of great peace, an immense peace, in a large abandoned farm".

"And in a calm temple, far from flat torment, waiting for death, more alive than life".

The abbey was partially listed as a monument historique by decree of October 29, 1926, and its chapel and the building adjoining it to the south were listed by decree of April 9, 1929.

=== Present day ===
In 2007, the International Garden Festival Jardins à suivre... created the Jardins de l'abbaye on the Sainte-Marie-au-Bois site, designed by landscape architect Olivier Berger with the help of students from the École d'horticulture et de paysage de Roville-aux-Chênes. Conceived as a symbolic pathway to Paradise, the various plantings evoke themes as varied as witchcraft, medicinal plants and the cardinal and theological virtues.

In addition, guided tours of part of the former abbey were organized on Sundays from June to September. Following the death of one of the owners in March 2008, it seems that access to the abbey and garden is no longer possible.

Visits are only possible on Heritage Day Sundays.

== Abbots ==
=== Twelfth century ===
- Richard (+ 1155)
- Conon (1155- c. 1167)
- Richard II (c. 1168)
- Simon (+ 1174)
- Arnould (ca 1174)
- Garnier (c. 1181-1182)
- Pierre (c. 1187)
- Erladus (c. 1195)
- Herbert (c. 1198)

=== Thirteenth century ===
- Hugues
- Hugbert
- Joseph
- Drogo
- Gilles
- Fulco
- Atto
- Robert
- Gérard I (c. 1248-1253)
- Rembaldus (c. 1261)
- Gérard II (c. 1264)
- Rembaldus II (c. 1268)
- Simon II (c. 1272)
- Walterus (1275)
- Dominique I de Vandières (c. 1280)
- Thierri I (c. 1283-1286)
- Nicolas I (c. 1290)
- Thierri II (c. 1295-1297)

=== Fourteenth century ===
- Jean I (1300)
- Nicolas II de Prény (+ 1326)
- Jean II (until around 1347)
- Jean III d'Onville (+ 1362)
- Jacques de Bouillonville (c. 1373)
- Pierre Génin (from 1382)

=== Fifteenth century ===
- Jean IV (until around 1426)
- Jean V Griffon (+ 1462)
- Jean VI de Dieulouard (c. 1462-1479)
- Jean VII de Mamey (abbot until 1498)
- Pierre de Prény (1498-1505)

=== Sixteenth century ===
- Dominique II Thuillier (1517-1534)
- Nicolas II Thuillier (+ 1558)
- Dominique III Thuillier (+ 1565)
- Didier Malhusson (1566-1594)
- Daniel Picart (1594-1600)

=== Seventeenth century ===
- Servais de Lairuelz (1600-1631) transferred the canons to Sainte-Marie-Majeure de Pont-à-Mousson in 1608.

== Architecture ==
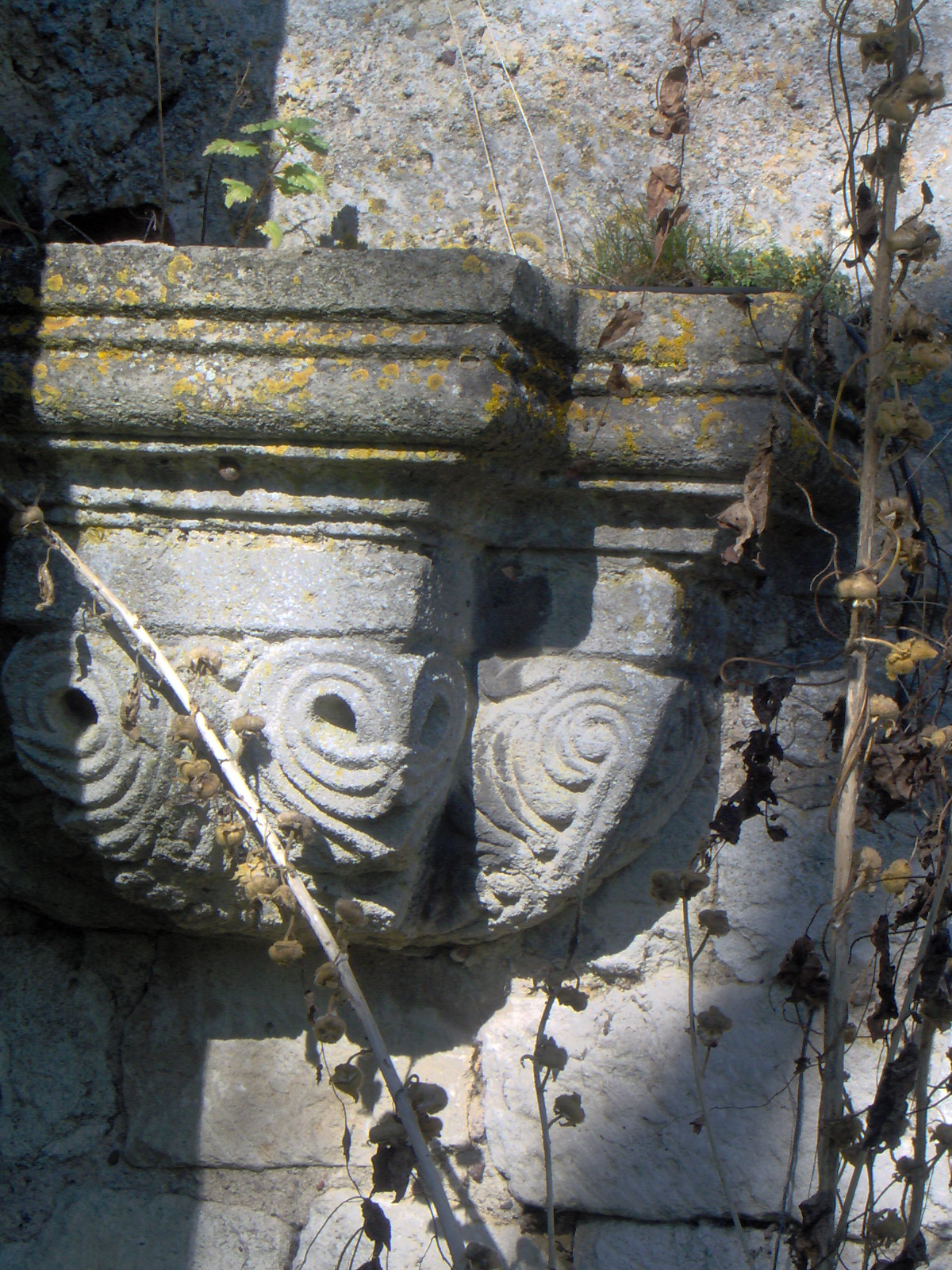
Capital, south facade of convent building

Today, the buildings are reduced to the abbey church (east-facing chevet), and the convent building adjoining the south side of the church. It is a homogeneous Romanesque structure dating from the end of the second quarter or the beginning of the third quarter of the 11th century, and bears witness to the Prémontrés' style of building, which is similar to the pared-down architecture of the Cistercians.

=== Abbey church ===
It consists of a central nave with ceiling and two vaulted aisles, and is 23 metres long overall.

The facade is remarkable: basilical in style, it reveals a kinship with the Cistercian abbey of Haute-Seille. Originally, the lowest level may have had five arcades.

The apse has disappeared; Slotta thinks it was round, as does Mazerand.

In the choir, a late-Gothic enfeu remains, housing the tomb of Abbé Dominique Thuillier, who died in 1534. During the Renaissance, the nave was raised with a ribbed vault.

Almost all the historians who have studied this abbey have noted the small size of the abbey church in its length, and have offered various explanations for this fact. Digot, in 1857, refutes the widespread belief that the nave was shortened during the reign of Servais de Lairuelz, when he transferred the monks to Pont-à-Mousson. In 1921, Heribert Reiners defended the idea that the nave had been shortened by half a bay at the time of Abbés Thuillier (Renaissance). Closer to home, Hubert Collin doesn't believe in shortening the nave; he thinks that, for unknown reasons, the monks cut back on a building that was originally designed to be larger.

Finally, Michel Mazerand hypothesizes that in 1780 and 1781, the nave was substantially reduced and the facade dismantled and reassembled, stone by stone. He bases this on a careful examination of the building, which reveals the presence of three keystones set into the masonry, corresponding to the three bays that were removed, and also on the discovery in the abbey's accounts of major works in 1780 and 1781. However, he refrained from giving a definitive opinion, stating that only soundings would reveal the truth.

At present, it can be seen that some of the arches on the façade are obscured, and that the stonework is different (suggesting that the façade has been partially rebuilt). Behind the façade, at least half a bay is missing, clearly visible through an interrupted vault. In all likelihood, the façade would have been located two and a half bays further forward than today, where the cloister's west gallery began.

=== Convent ===
On the first floor, starting from the church, is the sacristy, followed by the chapter house. The end of the building has disappeared (a two-bay hall). On the upper floor is the monks' dormitory, with small round-arched openings.

The chapter house comprises two three-bay vessels, with a rose on the east side, bordered by two round-headed windows. West openings to the cloister.

The cloister has disappeared, but traces of vaulting to the north and east bear witness to the existence of the north and east galleries.

== Gallery ==
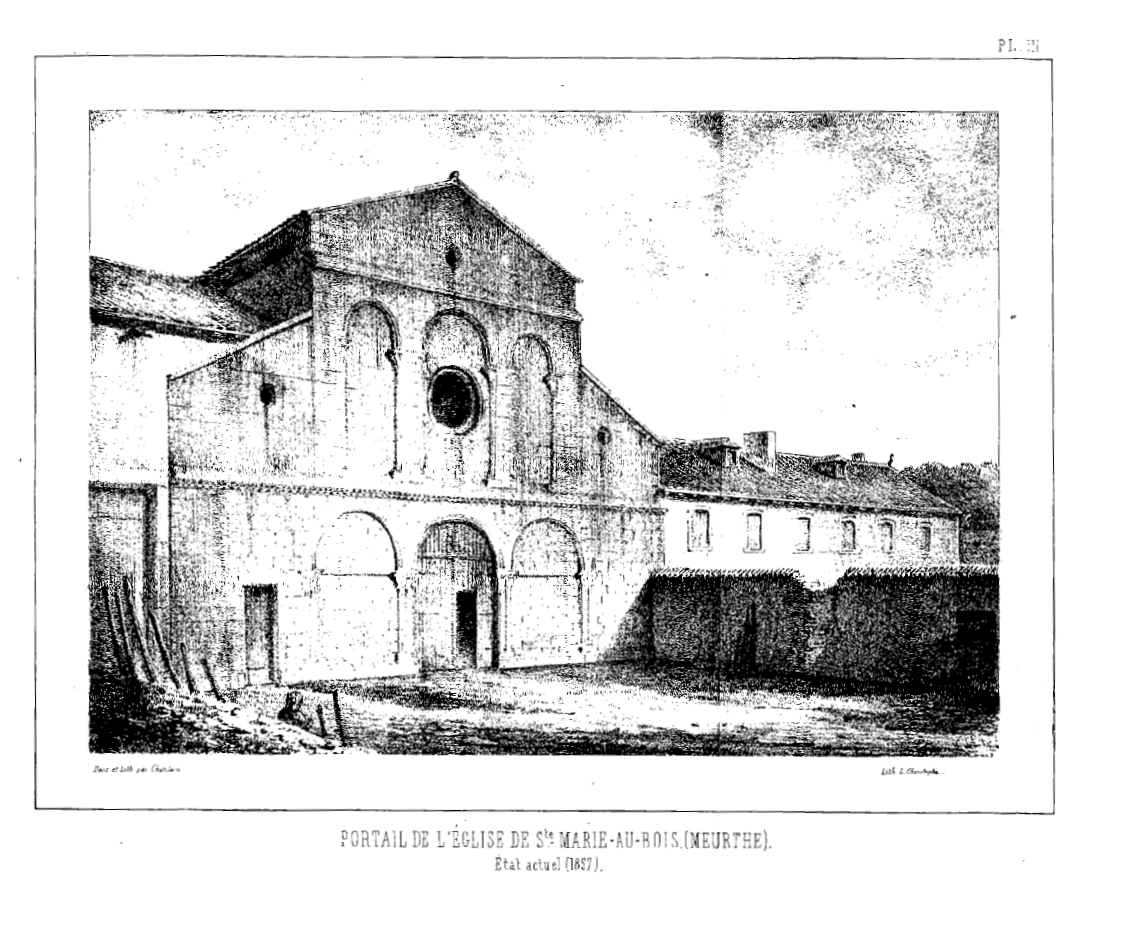
Facade of the abbey church (Digot and Chatelain, 1857)

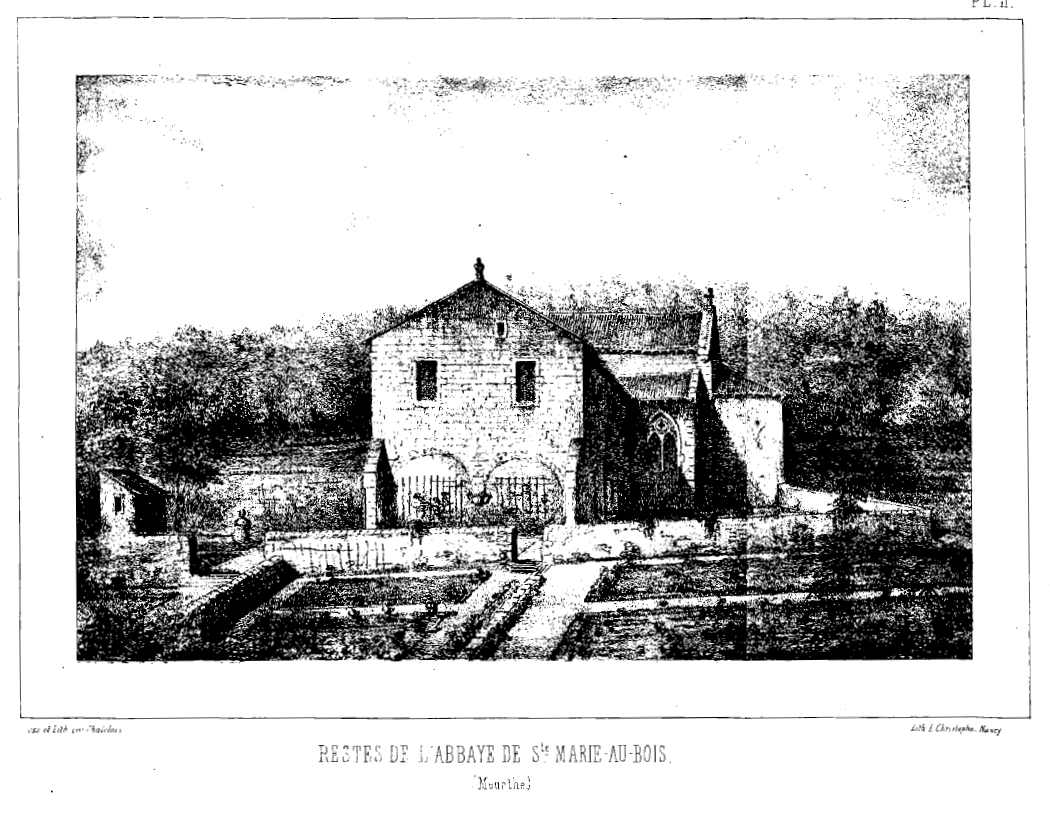
South facade of convent building (Digot and Chatelain, 1857)

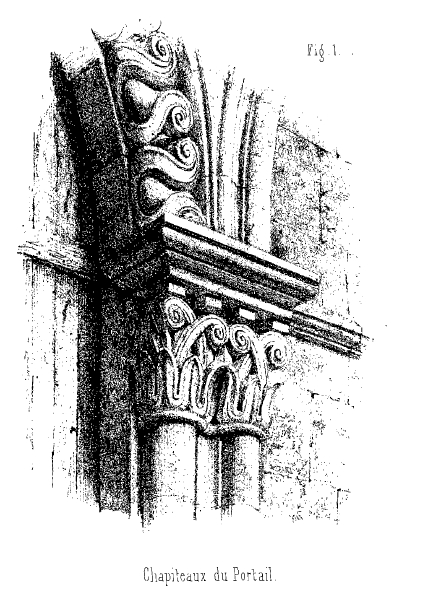
Abbey facade capital (Digot and Chatelain, 1857)

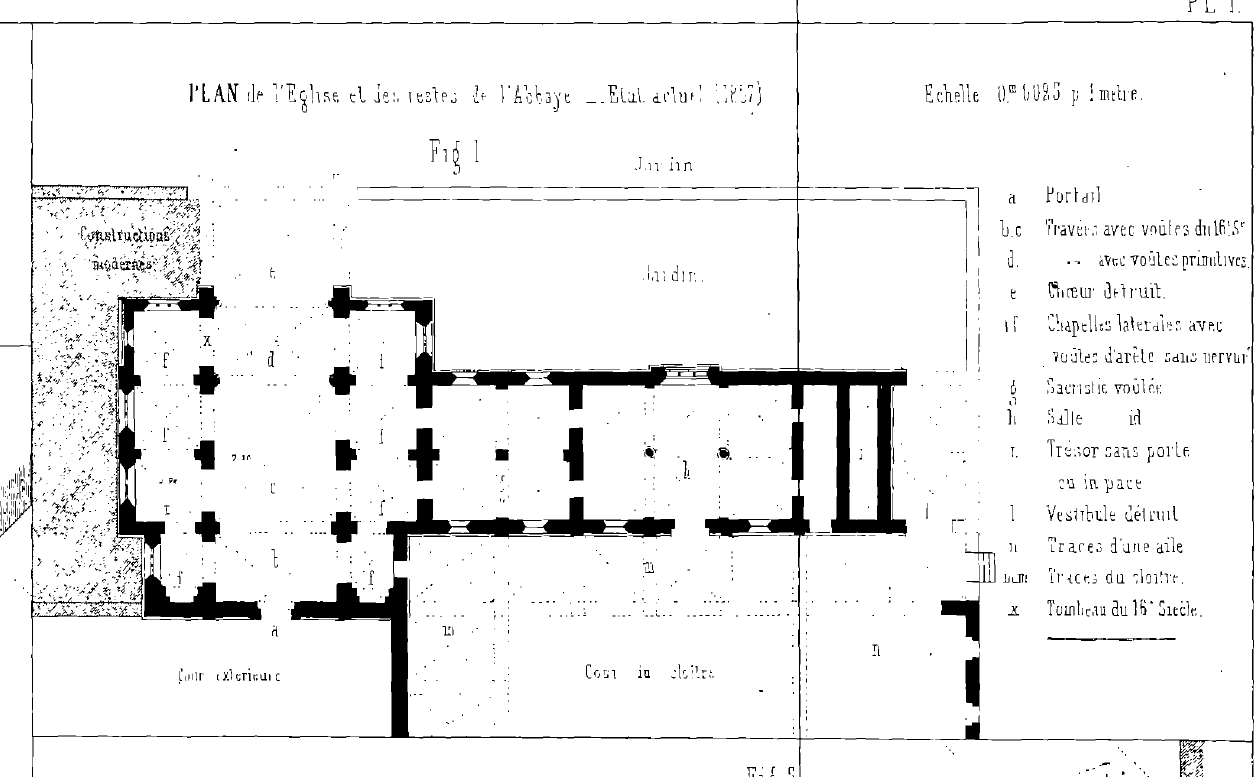
Map in 1857, Digot and Chatelain

== Dependent priories ==
As early as the 12th century, the abbey of Sainte-Marie-au-Bois possessed:

- A priory at Blanzey.
- During the 13th century, Abbot Gérard I founded another priory at Phlin, some twenty kilometers from the mother abbey.
- Mazerand also cites the Ménil priory at Marbache.
- The priory of Froville from 1091 to 1303, belonging to the abbey of Cluny, and at the latter date, united with the abbey of Sainte-Marie-au-Bois.

== Legend of the Virgin Oak ==
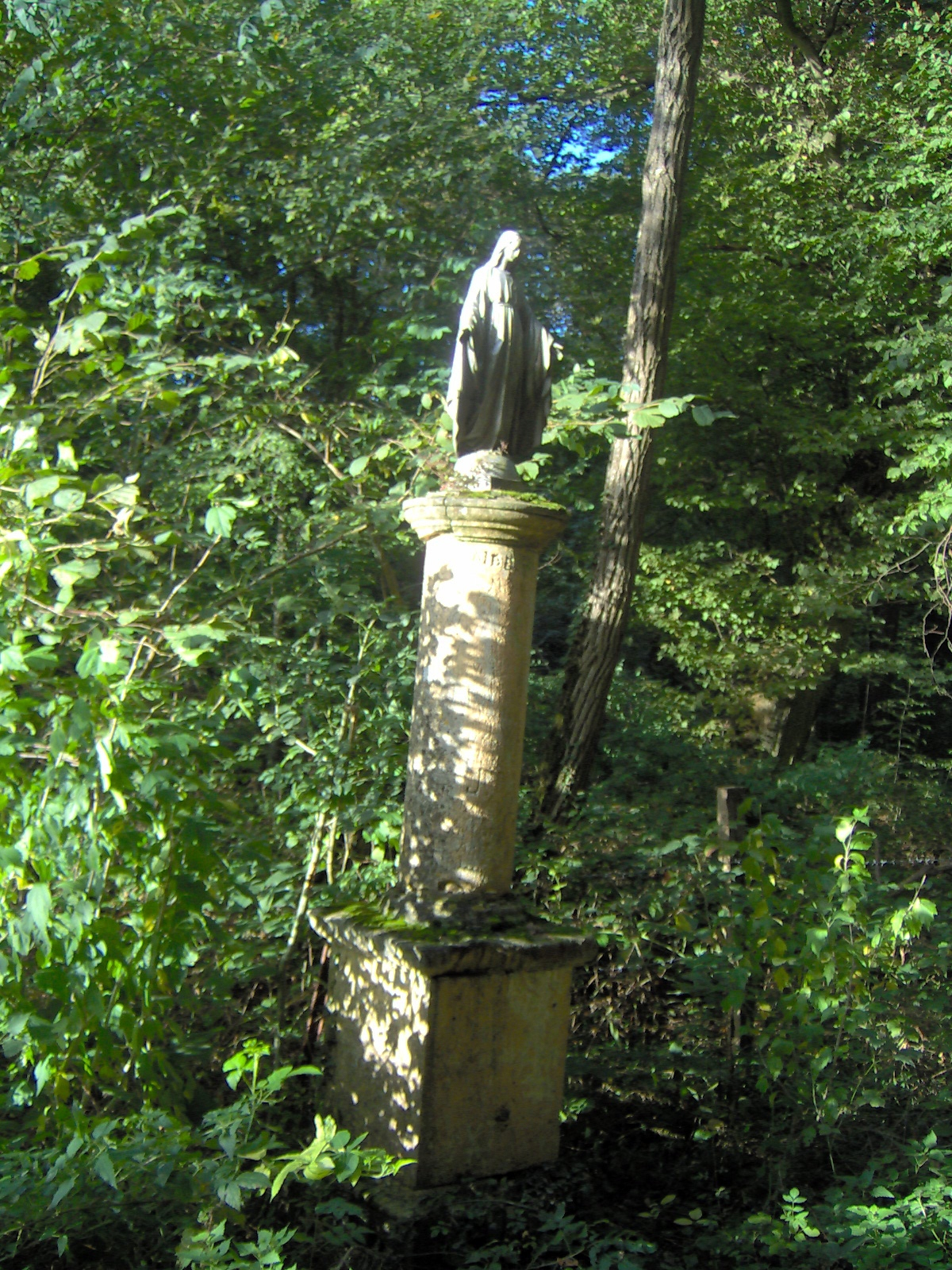
The Virgin Oak, Mailly-sur-Seille

An old Lorraine legend has preserved the memory of Sainte-Marie-au-Bois and its priory at Phlin. Written around 1840 by Emmanuel d'Huart, it was taken up by several authors after him. According to this legend, the Virgin Mary appeared to Chevalier Ancelin de Mailly on his way back from the Sixth Crusade, at a place known since then as Le Chêne-à-la-Vierge, and asked him to hurry if he wanted to see his very ill wife again, while she was still alive. Hurrying his horse, he arrived at the castle and was able to catch his dear wife's last breath. A few years later, still according to this legend, the Sire de Mailly had a priory of the Order of Saint-Norbert built between Mailly-sur-Seille and Phlin.

== See also ==
- Charles Péguy
- Simon I, Duke of Lorraine
- Gothic architecture

== Bibliography ==
- Bazaille, Manuel. Articles consacrés aux abbés de Sainte-Marie-aux-Bois. Pagny-sur-Moselle.
- Bazaille, Manuel (2012). "L'abbaye Sainte-Marie-aux-Bois". La nouvelle revue lorraine (14): 25–31.
- de Civry, Victor (1845). Vagner, Nancy (ed.). Les Ruines lorraines, chroniques monumentales (8 ed.). p. 103.
- Collin, Hubert (1998). Fondation d'une abbaye lorraine au XIIe siècle : l'exemple de Sainte-Marie-au-Bois, in : Les Prémontrés et la Lorraine XIIe - XVIIIe siècle. Paris.
- Digot, Auguste (1857). "L'abbaye de Sainte-Marie-au-bois, dessins par M. Chatelain". Bulletin Society d'archéology. 1 (7): 315–327.
- Marschall, Hans-Günther; Slotta, Rainer (1984). Lorraine romane. p. 54. ISBN 2-7369-0000-6.
- Mazerand, Michel (1986). Histoire de l'Abbaye de Sainte-Marie-au-Bois. Pays lorrain. pp. 111–127.
- Mazerand, Michel (1987). L'Abbaye de Sainte-Marie-au-Bois : architecture et sculpture. Pays lorrain. pp. 5–20.
- Parisse, Michel. "Les chanoines réguliers en Lorraine : fondation, expansion xie – xiie siècles". Annales de l'Est: 347–388.
- Poulet, Henry (1912). "Vieilles abbayes de Lorraine, Sainte-Marie-au-Bois". Revue Lorraine Illustrée: 73–85.
