= Jean Hugo =

French painter (1894–1984)

- Autoportrait, 1918
- Born: Jean Hugo; 19 November 1894; Paris, France
- Died: 21 June 1984 (aged 89); Lunel, France
- Occupation: Artist
- Spouses: Valentine Hugo (m. 1919, divorced) Lauretta Hugo (m. 1949)
- Children: 7
- Parents: Georges Victor-Hugo (father); Pauline Ménard-Dorian (mother)

Jean Hugo (French pronunciation: [ʒɑ̃ yɡo]; 19 November 1894 – 21 June 1984) was a painter, illustrator, theatre designer and author. He was born in Paris and died in his home at the Mas de Fourques, near Lunel, France. Brought up in a lively artistic environment, he began teaching himself drawing and painting and wrote essays and poetry from a very early age. His artistic career spans the 20th century, from his early sketches of the First World War, through the creative ferment of the Parisian interwar years, and up to his death in 1984. He was part of a number of artistic circles that included Jean Cocteau, Raymond Radiguet, Pablo Picasso, Georges Auric, Erik Satie, Blaise Cendrars, Marie-Laure de Noailles, Paul Eluard, Francis Poulenc, Charles Dullin, Louis Jouvet, Colette, Marcel Proust, Jacques Maritain, Max Jacob, Carl Theodor Dreyer, Marie Bell, Louise de Vilmorin, Cecil Beaton and many others.

== Hugo family ==
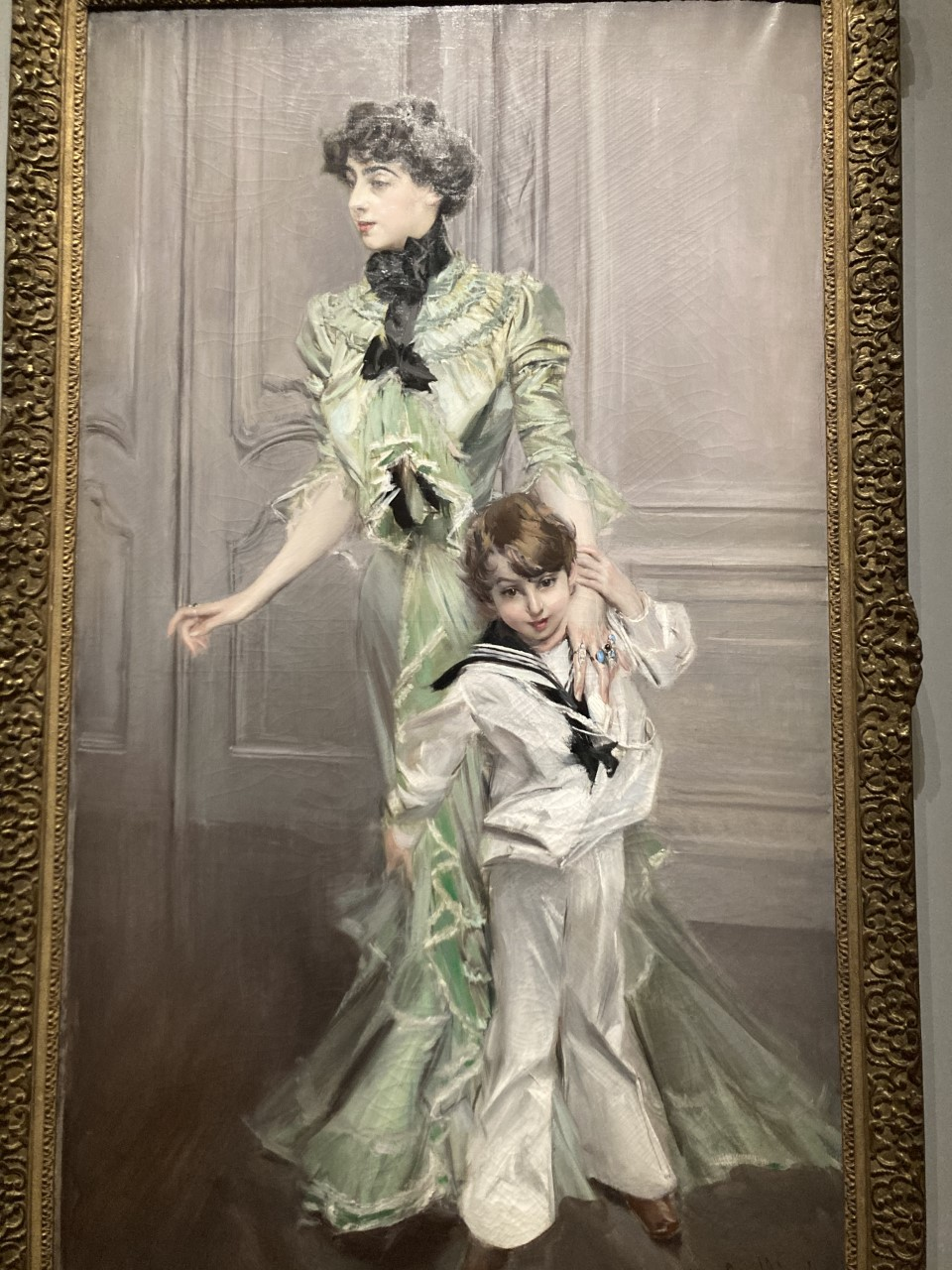
Portrait of Mrs. Georges Hugo and her son Jean (1898) by Giovanni Boldini.

Jean Hugo was the great-grandson of the poet, playwright, novelist, essayist, visual artist, statesman, human rights activist and exponent of the Romantic movement in France, Victor Hugo. His grandfather, Charles Hugo was a journalist, pioneer of early photographic techniques and a campaigner against the death penalty, and his father Georges Hugo was a published author and a recognised painter. His paternal aunt was the socialite Jeanne Hugo.

His mother, Pauline Ménard-Dorian, was the daughter of Paul-François Ménard, conseiller général and député of the Hérault department during the 1870s–80s, by his wife Aline Dorian, daughter of Pierre Frédéric Dorian, minister of works during the siege of Paris.

Jean Hugo was married twice, first in 1919 to Valentine Hugo (née Valentine Gross, no children from this civil marriage) and then in 1949 to Lauretta Hope-Nicholson, daughter of Hedley Hope-Nicholson. Jean Hugo and Lauretta had seven children: Charles Hugo (farmer), Marie Hugo (artist), Jean-Baptiste Hugo (artist), Adèle Hugo (artist), Jeanne Hugo-Chabrol (teacher), Sophie Hugo-Lafont (librarian), Léopoldine Hugo (artist).

Jean Hugo's half-brother François Hugo designed limited-edition jewellery interpretations for Pablo Picasso, Jean Cocteau, Max Ernst and Coco Chanel during the '20s Modern period. Pierre Hugo – son of François Hugo – is also a jewellery designer and has written a book about the artistic legacy of the Hugo family, Les Hugo – Un témoignage (Rocher, France, 2007).

== Paintings ==
Hugo is predominantly known for his sketches and oil or gouache paintings, which are often executed in small formats. He also illustrated books, designed theatre sets and costumes and produced ceramics, murals, textile designs and stained glass windows. Hugo designed the sets and costumes for Carl Theodor Dreyer's film The Passion of Joan of Arc (1928). His paintings can be viewed at the Barnes Foundation in Philadelphia, and are also present in collections in London, Tokyo, Toronto, Paris, Marseille, and at the Musee Fabre in Montpellier, France – where there is a room dedicated to his paintings.

Maison en ruine à la targette, 1915

Intérieur d'un bar, 1917

Panneaux de signalisation de chemin de fer (aquarelle, page de carnet), 1918

Jean Hugo's painting is unique in the artistic panorama of the first half of the 20th century and maintains originality while evoking avant-garde themes of magical realism or metaphysical painting. At the start of the 1930s, in between naïve and happy scenes and various theatrical projects – such as Jean Cocteau's Les mariés de la Tour Eiffel – he produced a series of works in brooding, unsettling, tones (Solitude, 1933).

He showed an interest in forest scenes (L'Ermite de Meudon, 1933) and religious themes (La Cène, 1933). L'Imposteur (1931) and La Baie des Trépassés (1932) were produced in the same period. His painting were based on the sketchbooks that he had with him at all times. He used to say that "Inspiration comes naturally but one has to arrange regular meetings with it".

L'Imposteur (1931) concludes Hugo's first artistic period, which coincides with his move from Paris to the family property at the Mas de Fourques, Lunel, France, following the death of his grandmother. This imposing painting is an assembly of the most important insights he had acquired thus far: the lessons of the Italian primitives, of Henri Rousseau, of Poussin and Picasso, sources of inspiration on which he is constantly drawing. The subject of the painting evokes the discomfort of the catechumen in the midst of the faithful, prevented from taking communion during Christmas mass at the Church of Saint-François in Montpellier. The painting is set in the countryside around Lunel, with its vineyards and low scrubland (garrigue). The tense and complex composition of the work is extremely well executed. No element, line, motif, nuance of colour or object is secondary. Each element contributes to the pictorial vision. The delicate volumes are bathed in luminosity and stand out from the background. The figures are fixed in the space by superimposed connections, in the Florentine manner.

In the middle of the 1930s, he began using oil paints to create his larger compositions while continuing to paint with tempera. Le Mangeur au chandail rayé (autoportrait) (1940) shows the artist in his home at the Mas de Fourques. The motif of the stripes contrasts with the neat contours of the table, the chimney and the wall. In this homely setting, the figure seems surrounded by mystery and casualness. Although Hugo does not draw greatly on De Chirico, this work evokes the feeling of isolation and mystery that characterises the production of the latter.

Jean Hugo's work bears witness to his intention to work outside of current trends and fashionable theories. He never felt the need to participate in the artistic debates of his time and paid the price for it by never achieving wide recognition of his work by the general public.

His auction record is $US308,200, for Les Plaisirs et les Jours, set at François de Ricqlès' auction, Paris, on 26 November 1999.

== Selected exhibitions ==
Hugo's work has been widely exhibited, with solo retrospectives taking place in France, England, Japan, Canada and the USA.

- Jean Hugo and Max Jacob, Claridge Gallery, London, 1929
- The Art of Jean Hugo, Art Gallery of Ontario, Toronto, 1973
- Jean Hugo, Musée Paul Valéry, Sète, 1974
- Jean Hugo '77, Ueno Royal Museum, Tokyo, 1977
- Jean Hugo, Musée Fabre, Montpellier, 1977–78
- Paintings and Drawings by Jean Hugo and Jean Cocteau, Sotheby's, London, 1981
- Jean Hugo: Costumes pour "l'Homme qui rit", Maison de Victor Hugo, Paris, 1984
- Jean Hugo: 1894–1984, Musée des Beaux Arts, Béziers, 1985
- Jean Hugo: palettes et souvenirs, Musée Victor Hugo, Paris, 1994–95
- Jean Hugo: Dessins des années de guerre (1915–1919), Château de Blérancourt Musée de la coopération franco-américaine, 1994–95
- Jean Hugo: Une Rétrospective, Pavillon du Musée Fabre, Montpellier, 1995
- Jean Hugo: a Retrospective, Julian Barran Gallery, London, 1996
- Jean Hugo et la Scène, Bibliothèque-musée de l’Opéra, Paris, 2001
- Jean Hugo, le manuscrit enluminé, Musée Médard, Lunel, 2014
- Jean Hugo: l'Enlumineur du Quotidien, Musée Pierre André Benoit, Alès, 2014

== Published work ==
- Le Retour de l'enfant terrible: Lettres 1923–1966 by Jean Bourgoint, Jean Hugo, Jean Mouton (Desclée de Brouwer, 1975)
- Avant d'oublier (Before I Forget), autobiography (Fayard, 1976), was a humorous memoir of his family and a first-hand account of the 1920s French Surrealist movement.
- Le Regard de la mémoire (Actes Sud, 1983) – Jean Hugo's memoirs of the period from 1914 to 1945. These memoirs recount Jean Hugo's military service during World War I, and his life and friendships in the Parisian art scene during the interwar years.
- Voyage à Moscou et Léningrad (Cercle d'Art, 1953, reprinted by Actes Sud, 1984)
- Carnets, 1946–1984 (Actes Sud, 1994) – The Carnets, or Notebooks, carry on from where Le Regard de la mémoire left off in 1945. They are based on the detailed diaries Hugo kept up to his death in 1984. The entries are unedited and instinctive, as found in the original notebooks, with an elegant, ironic writing style. Through his diary entries Jean Hugo reveals the alchemy of his artistic work, and the eye he brought to bear on people and landscapes. The book conveys the philosophy of his later years, sometimes disenchanted and often delectable. "My illness", wrote Jean Hugo on the last page of his diary, "is called artérite périphérique, like the new boulevard around Paris."

The book includes drawings and colour reproductions of Jean Hugo's paintings

- Dessins des années de guerre (1915–1919) – Drawings of the war (Actes Sud, 1994)

== Books illustrated by Jean Hugo ==
Hugo's first published illustration appeared in 1918, a monogram for La Sirène publishing house.

- Raymond Radiguet: Les Joues en Feu, Bernouard, 1920.
- Francis Jammes: Pommes d'Anis, Emile-Paul, 1923.
- Jean Cocteau: Les Mariés de la Tour Eiffel, NRF, 1924.
- Paul Morand: Les Amis Nouvel, Au Sans Pareil, 1924
- Shakespeare: Roméo et Juliette, Au Sans Pareil, 1926 (republished, in English, by the Folio Society, 1950).
- Jean Hugo: Le Miroir Magique, Jeanne Bucher, 1927.
- Jean Cocteau: Orphée, Stock, 1927.
- Marte Bibesco: Le Perroquet Vert, Jeanne Walter, 1929.
- André Maurois: Climats, Chamontin, 1929.
- Robert Louis Stevenson: An Inland Voyage, Overbrook Press, 1938.
- Maurice Sachs: Au temps du Boeuf sur le toit, Nouvelle Revue critique, 1939.
- Paul Eluard: En Avril 1944: Paris respirait encore!, Galerie Charpentier, 1945.
- Jean Racine: Phèdre, Tisné, 1946.
- Félicité de Lammenais (translator): L'Imitation de Notre Seigneur Jésus-Christ, Arts et Métiers, 1946
- Max Jacob: Le cornet à dés, Gallimard, 1948.
- Shakespeare: Romeo and Juliet, Folio Society, 1950.
- Charles Péguy: Le Mystère de la Charité de Jeanne d'Arc, Gallimard, 1951.
- Paul Claudel and Charles-Jean Odic: Cheminots de France, Résistance-Fer, 1952.
- Jean Hugo: Voyage à Moscou et Léningrad, Cercle d'Art, 1953.
- Gustav Jaeger: Jaeger's Natural History, WS Cowell, 1953.
- Louise de Vilmorin: L'Alphabet des aveux, NRF, 1954.
- Emmanuel d'Astier de la Vigerie: Sept fois sept jours, Guilde du Livre, 1956.
- Jean Hugo: Shakespeare's Cotswolds, Lund Humphries, 1964
- Jean Hugo: Actes présumés de saint Alban de Nant, Pierre-André Benoit, 1968
- Maurice Scève: Saulsaye, Nouveau cercle parisien du livre, 1971.
- Jean-Pierre Geay: L'Age d'or selon Jean Hugo, Pierre-André Benoit, 1984
- Jean Hugo: Petit Office de Notre-Dame, Les éditions de l'oeuvre d'art, 1994.

In addition Hugo illustrated many limited edition books published from 1948 to 1984 by Pierre-André Benoit (PAB), collaborating with writers including René Char, Marcel Jouhandeau, Tristan Tzara and René Crevel.

== Jean Hugo's theatrical projects ==
- 1921: costumes and masks for les Mariés de la tour Eiffel, ballet-pantomime by Jean Cocteau, with music by Les Six
  — costumes for la Belle Excentrique, ballet by Erik Satie
- 1922: decor and costumes for Esther de Carpentras, opera by Darius Milhaud and Armand Lunel
- 1924: decor and costumes for Cocteau's Roméo et Juliette (subsequently used by the Folio Society for their 1950 edition of Shakespeare's text)
- 1925: decor and costumes for la Femme silencieux, with music by Georges Auric
- 1926: decor for Cocteau's l'Orphée (costumes by Coco Chanel
  — decors and costumes for le Village blanc, ou Olive chez les nègres, operetta by Jean Wiener and Henri Falk
- 1927: decor and costumes for Armand Lunel & Darius Milhaud's Les malheurs d'Orphée
  — decors and costumes for Marcel Achard's le Jouer d'échecs
- 1935: decors and costumes for Boris Kochno's ballet les Cent Baisirs
- 1938: decors and costumes for the Comédie Française's production of Ruy Blas
- 1939: decors and costumes for the Comédie Française's production of Phèdre
- 1941: costumes for les Folies Françaises ballet based on music by Couperin
- 1942: costumes for les Nuits, by Alfred de Musset
- 1945: decors and costumes for André Gide's translation of Antony and Cleopatra at the Comédie Française
- 1946: decors and costumes for Boris Kochno's ballet les Amours de Jupiter
- 1981: decors for Jean-Joseph de Mondonville's Daphnis et Alcimadure, l'Opéra de Montpellier

== Books and films about Jean Hugo ==
- The Art of Jean Hugo (Art Gallery of Ontario, 1973) – by Richard Wattenmaker
- Albums de familles – Apostrophes (TV show, 17 February 1984) Ina.fr
- JEAN HUGO, Dessins des années de guerre, 1915–1919 (Actes Sud- Réunion des Musées Nationaux, 1994) – Catalogue d’exposition, Musée National de la coopération franco-américaine
- JEAN HUGO, une rétrospective (Actes Sud – Ville de Montpellier – Réunion des Musées Nationaux, 1995) - Catalogue d’exposition, Musée Fabre Montpellier
- Jean Cocteau – Jean Hugo, Correspondance (1995) – by Brigitte Borsaro and Pierre Caizergues
- Avec Jean Hugo (Presses du Languedoc, 2002) – by Robert Faure
- Murmures pour Jean Hugo (2013, Albin Michel) – by Marie Rouanet

== Quotations about Jean Hugo ==
Jean Cocteau: "Jean Hugo mixed his almost monstrous calm into the tumultuous enterprises of our youth. He was, and remains the very image of that perfect humility of the illuminators, for whom daily truths trumpeted decorative graces. His powerful hand, his big Jupiterian eye, his olympism in a way, did not use thunder but little watercolours so vast that it seemed as if their size was the result of a phenomenon of perspective. Indeed, he seems to view the sea in Brittany from a distance, and the garrigue by the big end of the telescope, which does not prevent him from evoking around us the mysterious odour of seaweed and wild herbs. Jean Hugo, subtle peasant, medieval monk, chases the angel from the bizarre through knowing all its tricks by heart."

Gustave Thibon: "I knew him intimately. He was a strange being, admirable, a mystic, a lover, a great artist, who no doubt sinned by excess of modesty. He had been a little tired of fame by his name, which was extremely heavy. [...] Jean Hugo spent his youth in that golden world of the big families of the Third Republic, the Berthelot, the Favre, the Renan, the Daudet, a world that he moved away from for a more isolated life in Lunel. His work is far better known, and valued, in America than in France, where he still suffers a little of being eclipsed by his name. I consider him a great painter, and a great painter that is relatively unknown. If he hadn't found others to look after publicising him, he would never have sold a single painting. Picasso, who was a good friend of his, used to say to him "you do nothing for your fame". And indeed he did nothing for it – others did it to him. Once again, he was a pure being. If the word innocence could be applied to anyone it was him. He was very handsome, and of prodigious vitality – dare I say Hugolian. He was detached enough not to install himself in his own name – while still showing unconditional admiration for the work of his great ancestor, that he knew in detail." Entretiens avec Gustave Thibon by Philippe Barthelet (Éditions du Rocher, Monaco, 2001)

Maurice Sachs: "Jean Hugo was calm, kind and generous. Life flowed calmly before him and we knew of no enemies of his. He carried the heavy burden of his family name with elegance. Like his father Georges Hugo he was a man of the world, a man of great distinction in heart and spirit, a kind friend, a man you would want to have in your life." La Décade de l'illusion (Paris, Gallimard, 1950 pp. 14–16)

Paul Morand: "Jean Hugo's artistic temperament holds its own outside of all fashions. His work reminds us of the marvels that the relaxation of some prince of ancient times might have produced, as can be found in the tales of a thousand and one nights."
