= Saint Artimidora =

Christian saint

Artimidora

Saint Artimidora was a Christian saint.

== History ==
His remains have been discovered in the Catacomb of Callixtus in Rome.

They were transferred into the new church of Aimargues in 1979.

== Bibliography ==
- Cantate pour la translation des reliques de sainte Artimidora, Soustelle, 1865.
- Sainte Artimidora, ou le corps d'une sainte martyre..., Soustelle, 1865.
