= Gaston Béchard =

French politician

Gaston Béchard

Gaston Samuel Béchard (born 21 May 1900 in Aimargues (Southern France); died in deportation on 2 April 1945 in Mauthausen concentration camp in Austria) was a socialist militant professor, trade unionist, and a French politician.

== Biography ==
=== Professional career ===
In October 1923 he was appointed as an assistant professor teaching technical subjects. He then entered practical school which was newly established by the upper primary school in Montceau-les-Mines in Eastern France.

=== Political career and arrest ===
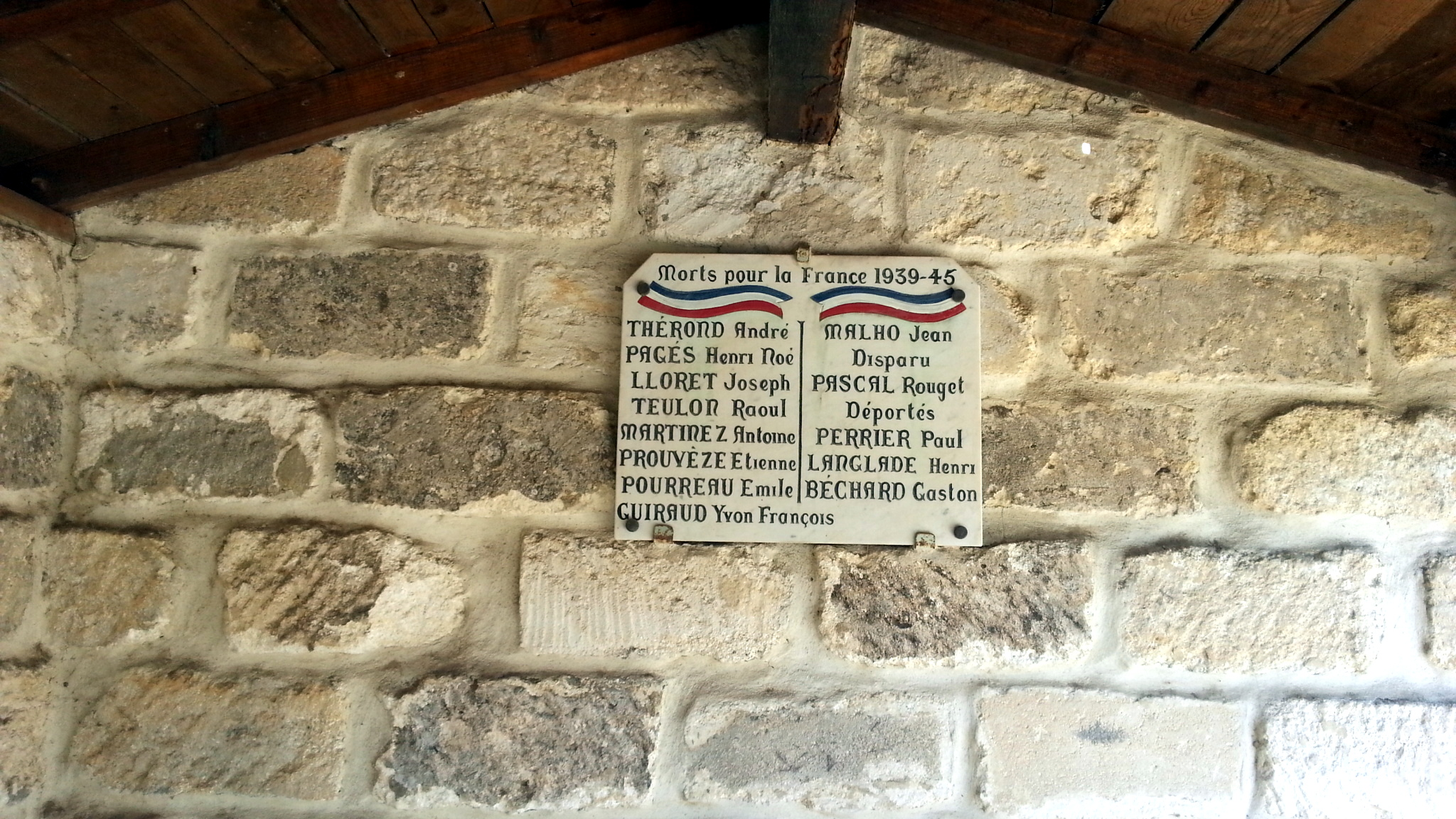
A plate to commemorate Gaston Béchard, in Aimargues cemetery.

He joined the CGT—France's largest trade union, worked with the Human Rights League, and was engaged in politics in the socialist ranks. On 19 September 1936 he was elected third deputy to Jean-Marie Bailleau, mayor of Montceau-les-Mines.

After being dismissed from his post by the government of Vichy France in 1941, he remained in France to oppose the regime.

On 2 August 1944 he was arrested at home by the Gestapo, possibly after being denounced. He was deported to the Natzweiler camp, where he was assigned registration number 24082. He was then relocated to Austria, to the Mauthausen concentration camp. He was further transferred to Kommando de Melk. He died of sepsis in April 1945, just before the liberation of the camp.

=== Places named after Béchard ===
The square of the district of La Sainte de Montceau-les-Mines, as well as a street in Aimargues, are named after Gaston Béchard.
