= Mas de Malherbes =

Hotel in the south of France

Coordinates: 43.65883°N 4.20677°E

The Mas de Malherbes is a provençal mas and a small hotel near Aimargues, in the south of France.

== History ==
He first belongs to Hyacinthe Fontanès, Louis XV's personal treasurer.

Property of the Ménard-Dorian family, from Lunel - whose notably members are Paul Ménard-Dorian and his daughter Pauline Ménard-Dorian, writer, great-granddaughter in-law of Victor Hugo, Marcel Proust's muse, who died in the mas in 1941. Marguerite, Jean Hugo's sister - the two children of Pauline -, is the heir of the domain. She received here Jean Cocteau, Paul Éluard, Max Jacob, Léon Daudet, Erik Satie, Léon Blum, Folco de Baroncelli-Javon and Fanfonne Guillierme.

== Bibliography ==
- Max Daumas and Henri Michel, Le domaine du Grand Malherbes, un mas célèbre de la Petite Camargue, 2004.
