= Michel Stahl =

French pastor and resistance fighter (1914–1989)

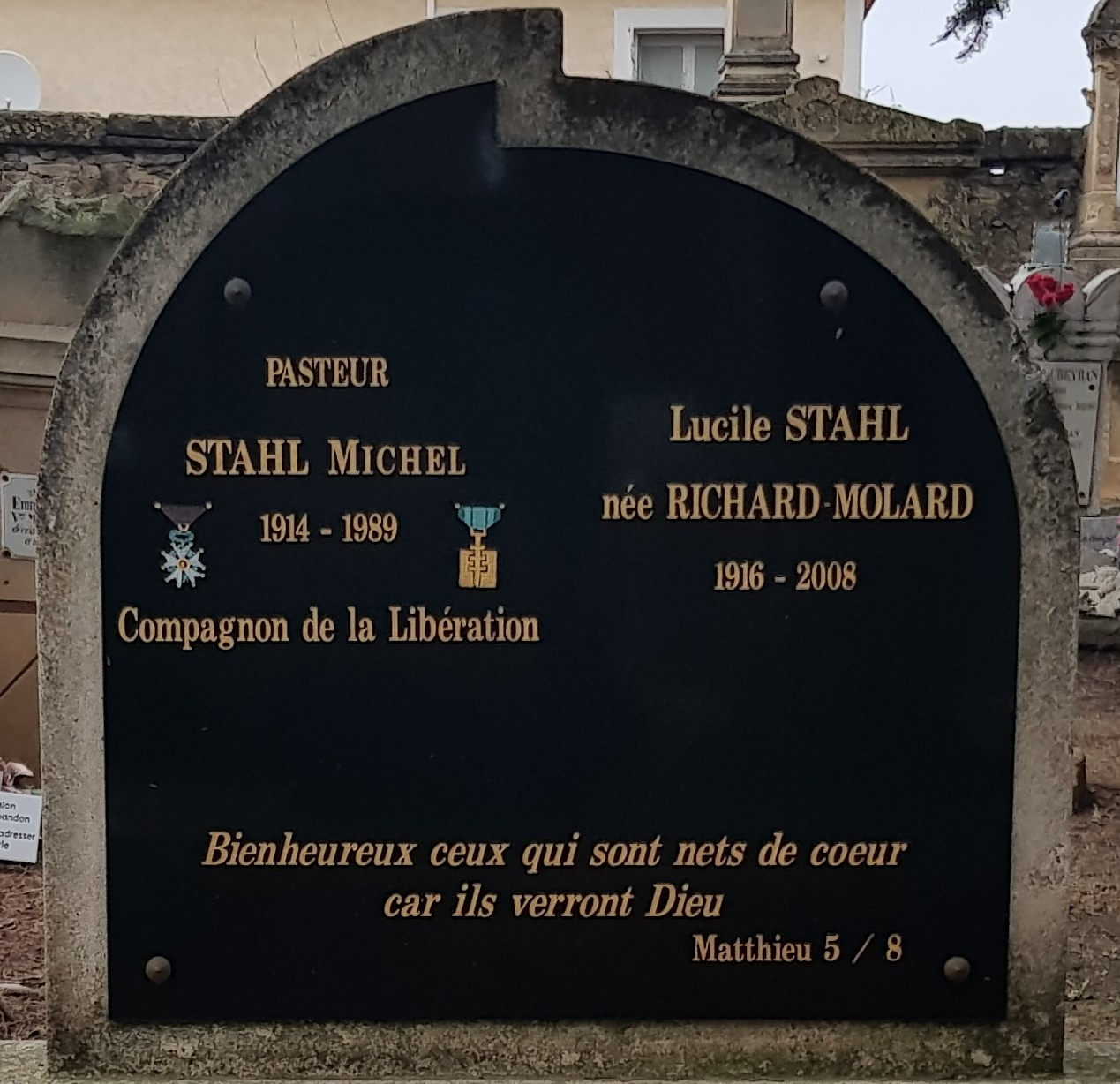

Michel Stalh (1914–1989) was a resistant and a pastor of the Reformed Church. He was a compagnon de la Libération. He joined the Free France in June 1940. He was made compagnon de la Libération by a decree of 7 August 1945. After the war, he became pastor of the Reformed Church of France at Bordeaux and then at Mulhouse. Retired, he lived in Aimargues until his death.
