= François-Isidore de Ricard =

French politician

Member of the House of Deputies
- In office 13 November 1822 – 28 July 1830
- Constituency: Gard

Personal details
- Born: 23 May 1779 Aimargues, Languedoc, Kingdom of France
- Died: 26 May 1849 (aged 70)
- Spouse: Marie-Joséphine Pellapra

François-Isidore de Ricard (23 May 1779 – 26 May 1849) was a French politician. Ricard was an MP for Gard.
