= Fanfonne Guillierme =

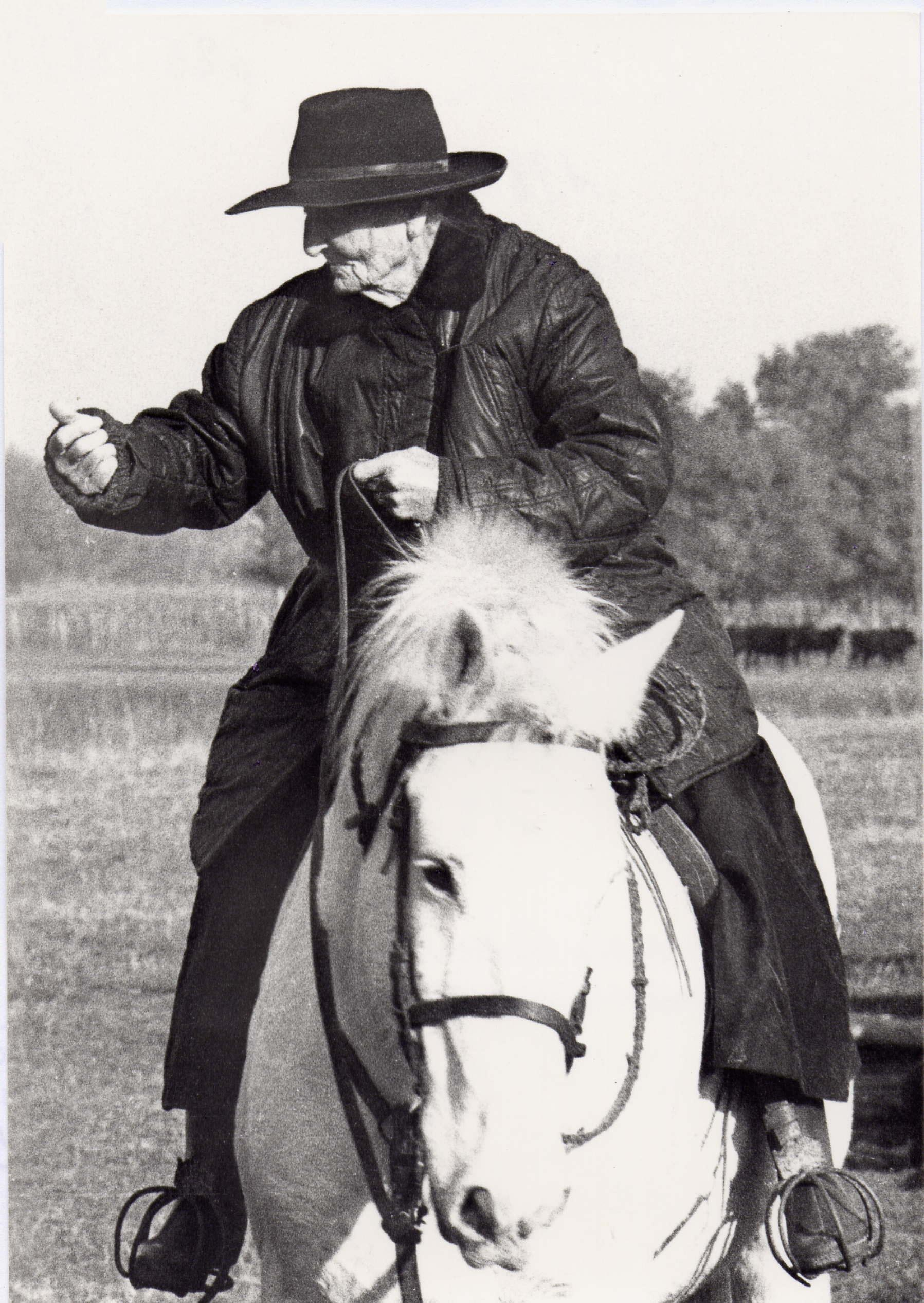
- Fanfonne in 1983
- Born: October 31, 1895; Paris, France
- Died: January 22, 1989 (aged 93); Aimargues
- Occupation: Gardian

Fanfonne Guillierme born Antoinette Guillierme (October 31, 1895, in Paris and died on January 22, 1989, in Aimargues) was a French manadière. She is known as "the Grande Dame of the Camargue".
