= Servais de Lairuelz =

Premonstratensian abbot and monastic reformer

Annibal-Servais de Lairuelz (1560 – 18 October 1631), a native of Hainaut in what is now Belgium, was a canon and reformer of the Premonstratensian Order.

== Biography ==
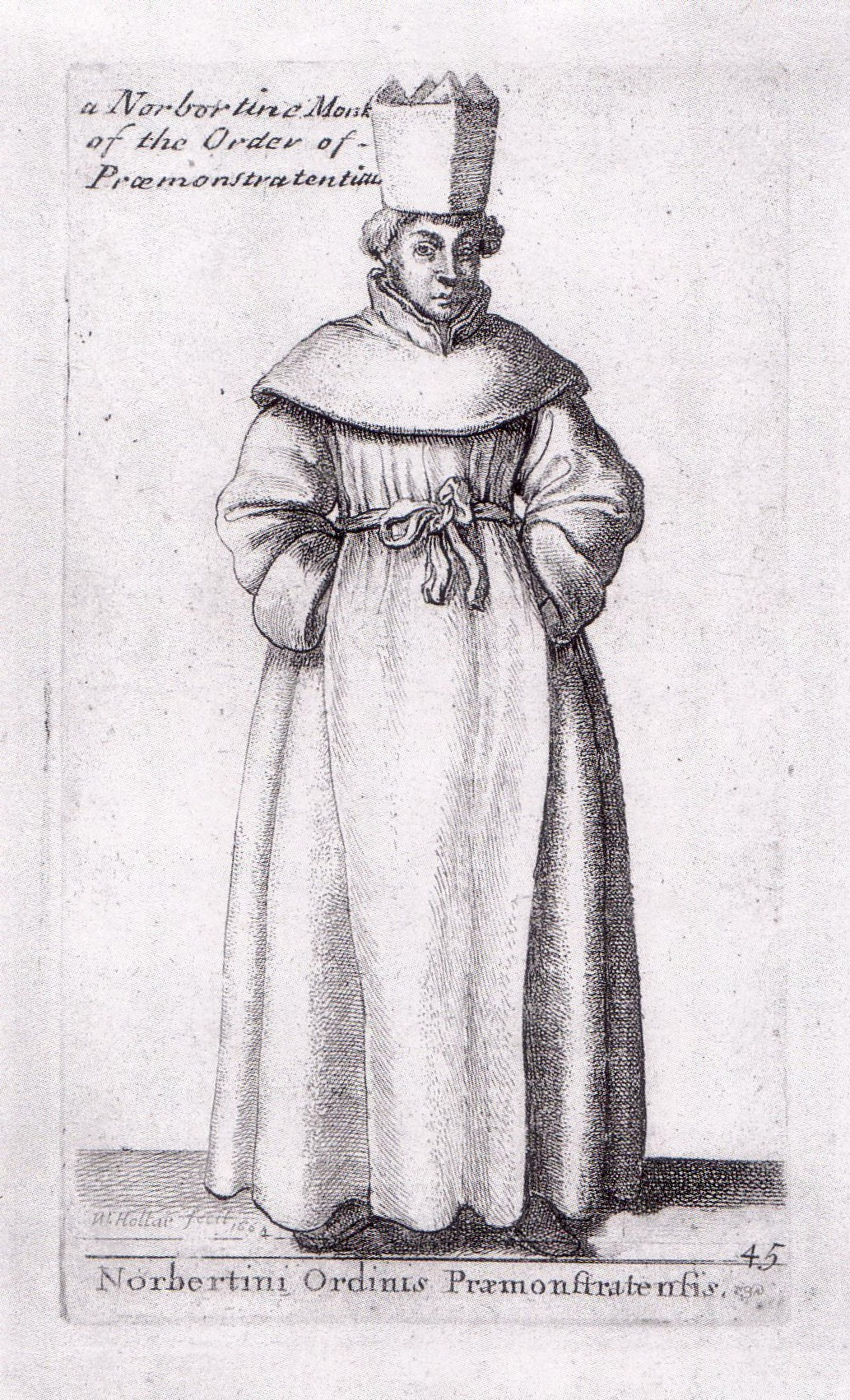
A 17th-century Premonstratensian (Wenceslas Hollar)

De Lairuelz was born in 1560 in Soignies in the County of Hainaut. He was baptised Annibal, but the Bishop of Verdun, Nicolas de Bousmar, gave him the confirmation name Servais (Servatius). He made his religious vows in 1580 in the Premonstratensian Abbey of St Paul, Verdun, where his uncle was prior, after which he attended the University of Pont-à-Mousson, founded by the Jesuits in 1572, while living at the Abbey of Sainte-Marie-au-Bois. In 1585, he moved to Paris to pursue his studies at the Sorbonne, while living at the Premonstratensian college in Paris. After he was made doctor of theology, he returned to St Paul's, Verdun.

A serious illness brought about a profound religious change in him and he began to work for the revival of monastic discipline in his religious order, of which he was appointed vicar general towards 1597. He then made a visitation of Premonstratensian abbeys in Germany, Austria and what is now Belgium. His reform began with a number of monasteries in Lorraine which grouped together as the "Communauté de la primitive rigueur", also known as the "Réforme de Lorraine", later expanding to include about 40 monasteries. In 1600, he succeeded Daniel Picart as abbot of Sainte-Marie-au-Bois, and started sending his young religious to study at the University of Pont-à-Mousson. From 1607 he worked to move the abbey to a site adjacent to the university. Construction of the new Pont-à-Mousson Abbey, also known as Sainte-Marie-Majeure, began in 1609 and was completed in 1616.

In 1631, to escape the plague epidemic that had broken out in Pont-à-Mousson, he and the community returned to Sainte-Marie-au-Bois, where he died on 18 October.

== Works ==
De Lairuelz published 10 or so books in promotion of the strict observance, marked also by the influence of Ignatian spirituality. These include:

- Optica Regularium (1603), establishing the basis of the "Réforme de Lorraine"
- Statute of reform of the Premonstratensian Order
- Catechism of Novices

== Sources ==
- Dictionnaire de spiritualité... Tome IX, Paris, Beauchesne, 1976, col. 117-119
- Pierre Lallemand, Les Prémontrés : Pont-à-Mousson, Sarreguemines, Pierron, 1990 ISBN 2708500813
- Jean Fournée, L'introduction de la Réforme de Lorraine en Normandie, Éditions Beauchesne, 1998
