= Pierre Torreilles =

French writer, poet and editor (1921–2005)

- Born: 21 May 1921; Aimargues, France
- Died: 22 February 2005 (aged 83); Montpellier, France
- Occupations: Writer; Bookseller; Poet

Pierre Torreilles (21 May 1921 – 22 February 2005) was a French writer, poet and editor.

He founded the Sauramps bookstore in Montpellier in 1946.

== Works ==
(by chronological order)

Collections of poems

- Noces d'Ea et Nin-Ki. Montpellier : impr. de H. Sauramps, 1950, 57 p.
- Solve et coagula. Paris : impr. de G. Lévis Mano, 1953, 53 p. Éd. originale 20 ex. sur vélin du Marais
- L'Arrière pays clos. Paris : G.L.M, 1961.
- Corps dispersé d'Orphée.... Neuchâtel : la Baconnière, 1963, 98 p. (La Mandragore qui chante; 7)
- Répons, une Amphore, et soudain l'oiseau n'irrigue plus l'espace. Paris : G.L.M., 1963, 33 p.
- Mesure de la terre. Paris : G.L.M., 1966, 49 p.
- Voir : poèmes. Paris : Éditions du Seuil, 1968, 96 p.
- Le Désert croît : poèmes. Paris : Éditions du Seuil, 1971, 159 p.
- Errantes graminées / lithographie en couleurs de Joan Miró. Paris : G.L.M., 1971, 45 p.
- Denudare : ode. Paris : Gallimard, 1973, 170 p. Rééd. Gallimard, 1993, 169 p. (Collection Poésie; 271)
- Espace déluté / sept pointes-sèches de Pierre Tal-Coat. Montpellier : Fata morgana, 1974. Tirage à 80 exempl. sur vélin d'Arches, et 20 exempl. marqués HC
- Cyprès d'orage. Issirac : "Solaire", 1975, 10 p. Extrait de "Solaire", 10-11.
- L'Ineffaçable / gravure de Yves Jeener. Paris : Éditions "Commune mesure", 1975, [9] p. (Collection Petites choses). Tiré à 100 ex.
- Menace innominée. Paris : Grasset, 1976, 155 p.
- Pratique de la poésie / Montpellier : Fata Morgana, 1977, 46 p.
- Espace déluté. Gravures de Tal Coat. Montpelliers : Fata Morgana, 1977.
- Toutes les aubes conjuguées / eaux-fortes de Olivier Debré. Losne : T. Bouchard, 1978, 21 p. Tiré à 80 ex.
- Les Dieux rompus. Paris : Gallimard, 1979, 86-[7] p.
- Laconiques. Saint-Clément-de-Rivière : Fata Morgana, 1979, 33 p.
- La Voix désabritée. Paris : Gallimard, 1981, 58 p.
- Territoire du prédateur : poème en 5 chants. Paris : Gallimard, 1984, 112 p.
- Margelles du silence : poème. Paris : Gallimard, 1986, 139 p.
- Parages du séjour : poème. Paris : Grasset, 1989, 79 p.
- Venant à stance : poèmes. Paris : Gallimard, 1990, 103 p
- Où se dressait le cyprès blanc : poèmes. Paris : Gallimard, 1992, 95 p.
- 7 aphorismes. Gallargues : éd. À travers, 1994.
- Ici et maintenant. ill. Jacques Clauzel. Gallargues, À travers, 1994.
- Orages de silence. ill. Jacques Clauzel. Gallargues, À travers, 1994.
- L'écrin d'ombre. ill. Jacques Clauzel. Gallargues, À travers, 1994.
- Ourlé de silence. ill. Jacques Clauzel. Gallargues, À travers, 1995.
- Au portail rouillé, suivi de Salines. ill. Jacques Clauzel. Gallargues, À travers, 1996.
- L'aigle de mer. ill. Jacques Clauzel. Gallargues, À travers, 1998.
- L'Envol de la chouette / gravures de Thierry Le Saëc. Languidic : Éd. de l'Atelier, 1997, 58 p.
- Ce qui heurte à nos mots / ill. de Thierry Le Saëc. Saint-Clément : Fata Morgana, 1998, 41 p.
- La Semence de l'eau; suivi de Ce peu de bleu entre nos doigts. Mortemart : Rougerie, 1998, 62 p.
- Quelque chose qui vient de loin. Mortemart : Rougerie, 2000, 51 p.
- Où se vient amarrer le bleu / dessins de Jacques Clauzel. Cannes : Tipaza, 2000, 67 p. (Néographies; 5)
- Paroles arlatines. ill. Jacques Clauzel. Gallargues, À travers, 2000.
- Dans le calme de l'œil / Yves Picquet, estampes. Plouedern : Éd. Double cloche, 2000, 25 p.
- Échardes de lumières / gravures de Louis Cordesse. Saint-Clément-de-Rivière : Fata Morgana, 2001, 31 p.
- Paysage sans tain. ill. Jacques Clauzel. Gallargues, À travers, 2001.
- Sablier de silence. ill. Jacques Clauzel. Gallargues, À travers, 2001.
- Chants de la lumière et de l'énigme. Ill.Jacques Clauzel. Saint-Clément de-Rivière : Fata Morgana, 2003, 36p.
- Résonance, précédé de Dédale. Mortemart : Rougerie, 2004, 59 p.
- Ressac. Peintures d'Enan Burgos. Montpellier : Fata Morgana, 2006.
- Pratique de la poésie, réédition, suivi d'une conférence de l'auteur. Présentation de Salah Stétié. Gravure de Daniel Schmerck. Bruxelles : La Maison d'à côté.
- Quelque chose qui vient de loin, rééd. maître d'œuvre Thierry Le Saec avec œuvres originales de P. Tal Coat (pointes sèches), Olivier Debré (dessin lithographique), Louis Cordesse (eau forte), Yves Piquet (sérigraphie), Jacques Clauzel (bois gravé), Yves Jeener (burin), Thierry Le Saec (pointes sèches et bois gravé), Joël Leick (peintures), Enan Burgos (peintures). Ed. limitée 49 ex. Ed. de La Canopée, 56440 Kergollaire-Languidic, 2008.
- Pratique de la poésie, rééd.groupée de Pratique de la poésie, Où se vient amarrer le bleu, Echardes de lumière, Chants de la lumière et de l'énigme, Ressac. Montpellier : Fata Morgana, 2011.

Anthologies

- Andrée Chedid, "Voix multiple" / textes réunis par Gabrielle Althen et Pierre Torreilles. Marseille : "Sud", 1988, 258 p. N° spécial de : "Sud".
- Vagabondages / Michel Butor; Andrée Chédid; Charles Dobzynski; Salah Stétié; Pierre Torreilles; 5 gravures de Jacques Clauzel. Gallargues-le-Montueux : À travers, impr. 1997, [9] f. Chaque placard est tiré à 25 ex. Éd. tirée à 10 ex. numérotés de I à X

Studies

- Guy Lévis Mano / étude de Andrée Chédid et Pierre Torreilles; choix de poèmes de G. Lévis Mano. Paris : Seghers, 1974, 189-[16] p. (Poètes d'aujourd'hui; 218). Rééd. Paris : Seghers, 1990, 189-[16] p. (Poètes d'aujourd'hui; 218)

== Prizes ==
- 1974: Prix Broquette-Gonin of the Académie française for Le Désert croît
- 1976: Prix international de Nice for Menace innominée
- 1990: Prix Max-Jacob for Parages du séjour
