= Villeroy, Seine-et-Marne =

Villeroy
- Commune
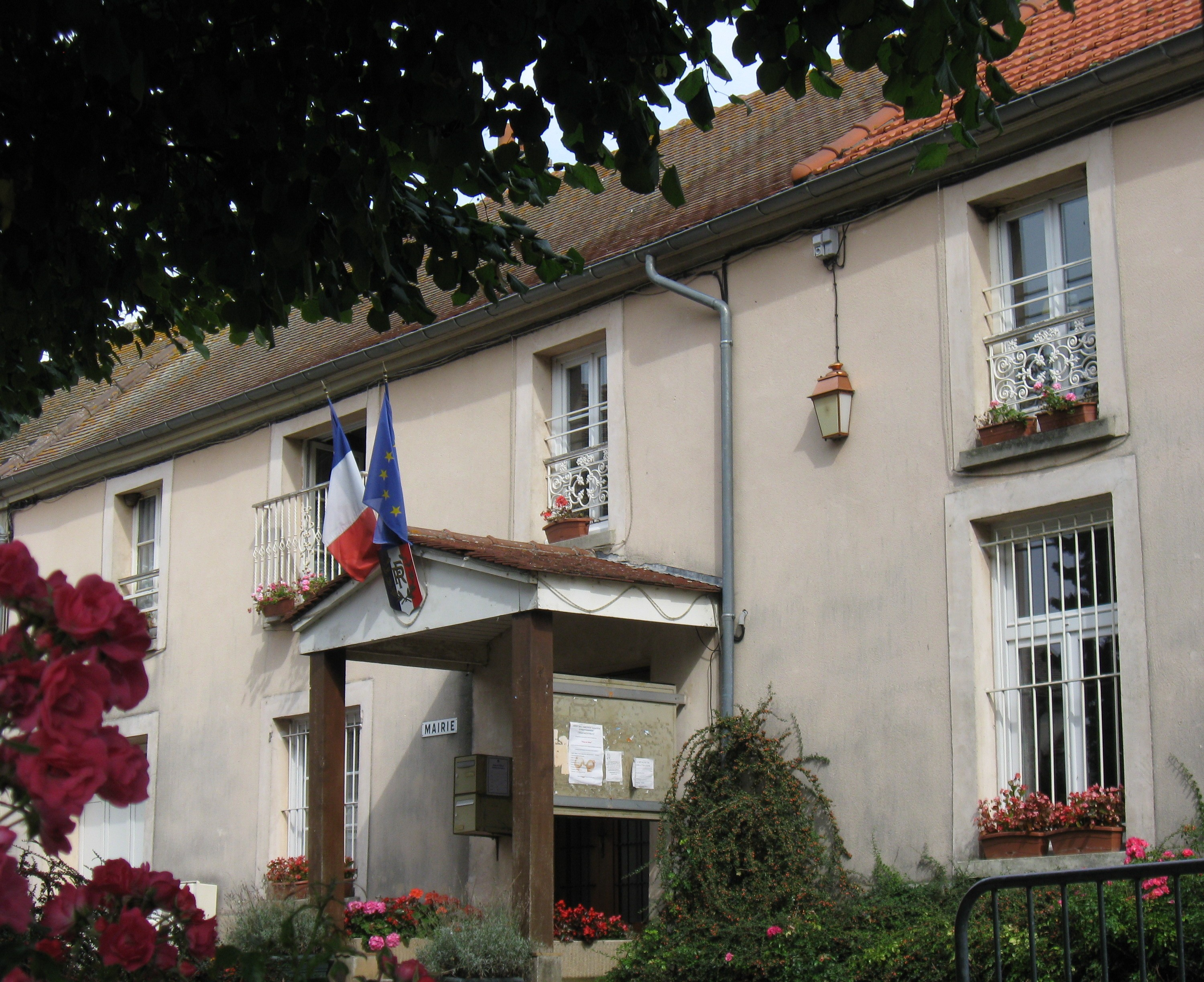
- The town hall in Villeroy
- Location of Villeroy
- Location within France Location within Île-de-France (region)
- Coordinates: 48°58′56″N 2°46′56″E
- Country: France
- Region: Île-de-France
- Department: Seine-et-Marne
- Arrondissement: Meaux
- Canton: Claye-Souilly
- Intercommunality: CC Plaines et Monts de France

Government
  - Mayor (2024–2026): Benoît Codron
- Area^{1}: 5.71 km^{2} (2.20 sq mi)
- Highest elevation: 130 m (430 ft)
- Lowest elevation: 81 m (266 ft)
- Population (2023): 711
  - Density: 125/km^{2} (323/sq mi)
- Time zone: UTC+01:00 (CET)
  - Summer (DST): UTC+02:00 (CEST)
- INSEE/Postal code: 77515 /77410
- ^{1} French Land Register data, which excludes lakes, ponds, glaciers > 1 km^{2} (0.386 sq mi or 247 acres) and river estuaries.

Villeroy (French: [vilʁwa]) is a commune in the Seine-et-Marne department in the Île-de-France region in north-central France. It is at Villeroy that the famous French poet Charles Péguy lost his life, the day before the beginning of the Battle of the Marne in the first world war. There is a monument to him there.

== See also ==
- Communes of the Seine-et-Marne department
