= Pauline Ménard-Dorian =

French writer and salon hostess (1870–1941)

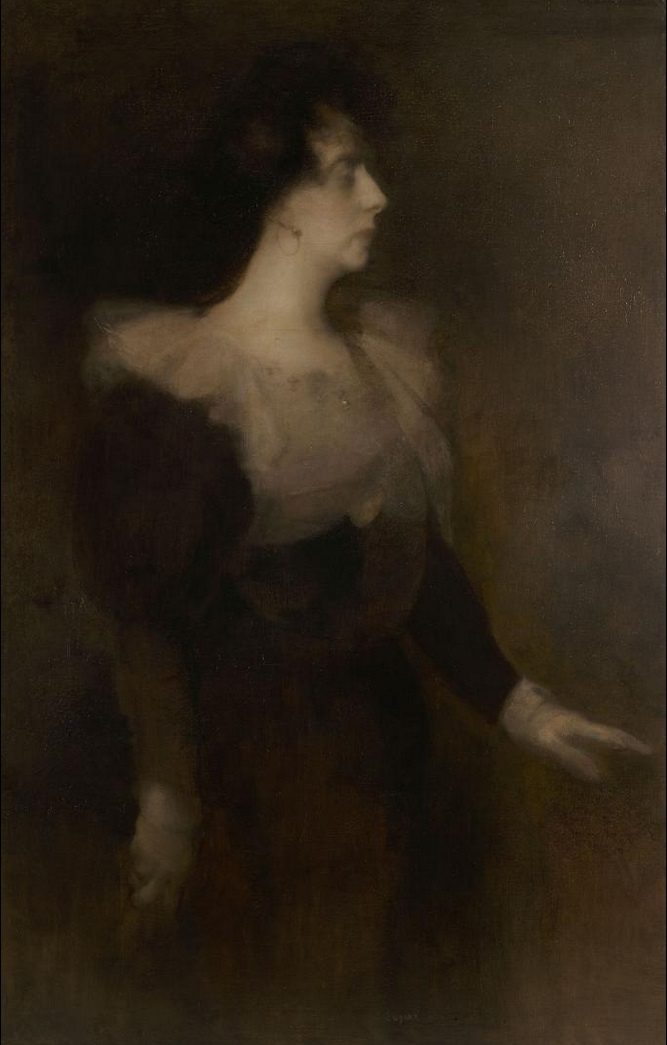
- Portrait of Pauline Ménard-Dorian by Eugène Carrière circa 1890.
- Born: 21 July 1870; Château du Fraisses, Fraisses, Third French Republic
- Died: 24 December 1941 (aged 71); Mas de Malherbes; Aimargues, Gard; Vichy France
- Known for: salon hostess
- Spouse: Georges Victor-Hugo (1894–1899; div.)
- Children: Jean Hugo; Marguerite Hugo
- Parent(s): Paul-François Ménard; Louise-Aline Dorian

Pauline Ménard-Dorian (French pronunciation: [polin menaʁ dɔʁjɑ̃]; 21 July 1870 – 24 December 1941) was a French woman of letters and a literary salon hostess of La Belle Époque.

== Early life and family ==
Pauline Ménard-Dorian was born at the Château du Fraisse on 21 July 1870 to Paul-François Ménard, a wealthy politician and businessman, and Louise-Aline Dorian. A member of a prominent Republican family, her maternal grandfather, Pierre Frédéric Dorian, served as the Minister of Public Works for the French Third Republic. She was raised as a Protestant. She spent her childhood between living in a hotel in the Rue de la Faisanderie and her family's properties in Fraisse and Lunel.

Her mother hosted Republican salons attended by Jules de Goncourt, Edmond de Goncourt, Émile Zola, Alphonse Daudet, Auguste Rodin, Élie-Abel Carrière, Victor Considerant, and Georges Clemenceau, Georges Périn, Allain-Targé, Challemel-Lacour, and Henri Rochefort.

== Adult life ==
In 1894 Ménard-Dorian married Georges Victor-Hugo, a grandson of Victor Hugo. They had two children, Marguerite and Jean. Through her marriage she was a sister-in-law of the socialite Jeanne Hugo. She and her husband hosted popular literary and political salons in Paris attended by Zola, Marcel Proust, Léon Daudet, the Goncourt brothers, Jean Cocteau, Max Jacob, Eugène Carrière, and Erik Satie. The marriage was an unhappy one, and Ménard-Dorian filed for divorce in 1899.

Ménard-Dorian died on 24 December 1941 at the Mas de Malherbes in Aimargues.

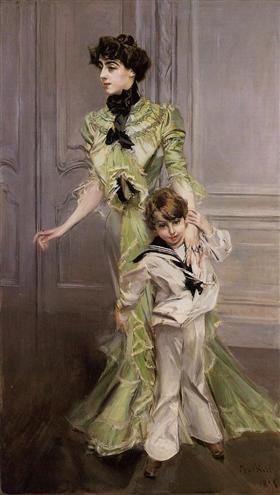
Portrait of Madame Georges Hugo, and her son Jean by Giovanni Boldini, 1898, oil on canvas - Subject: Madame Georges Hugo (born Pauline Ménard-Dorian) and her son, Jean Hugo
