= Maurice Sachs =

French-Jewish writer (1906–1945)

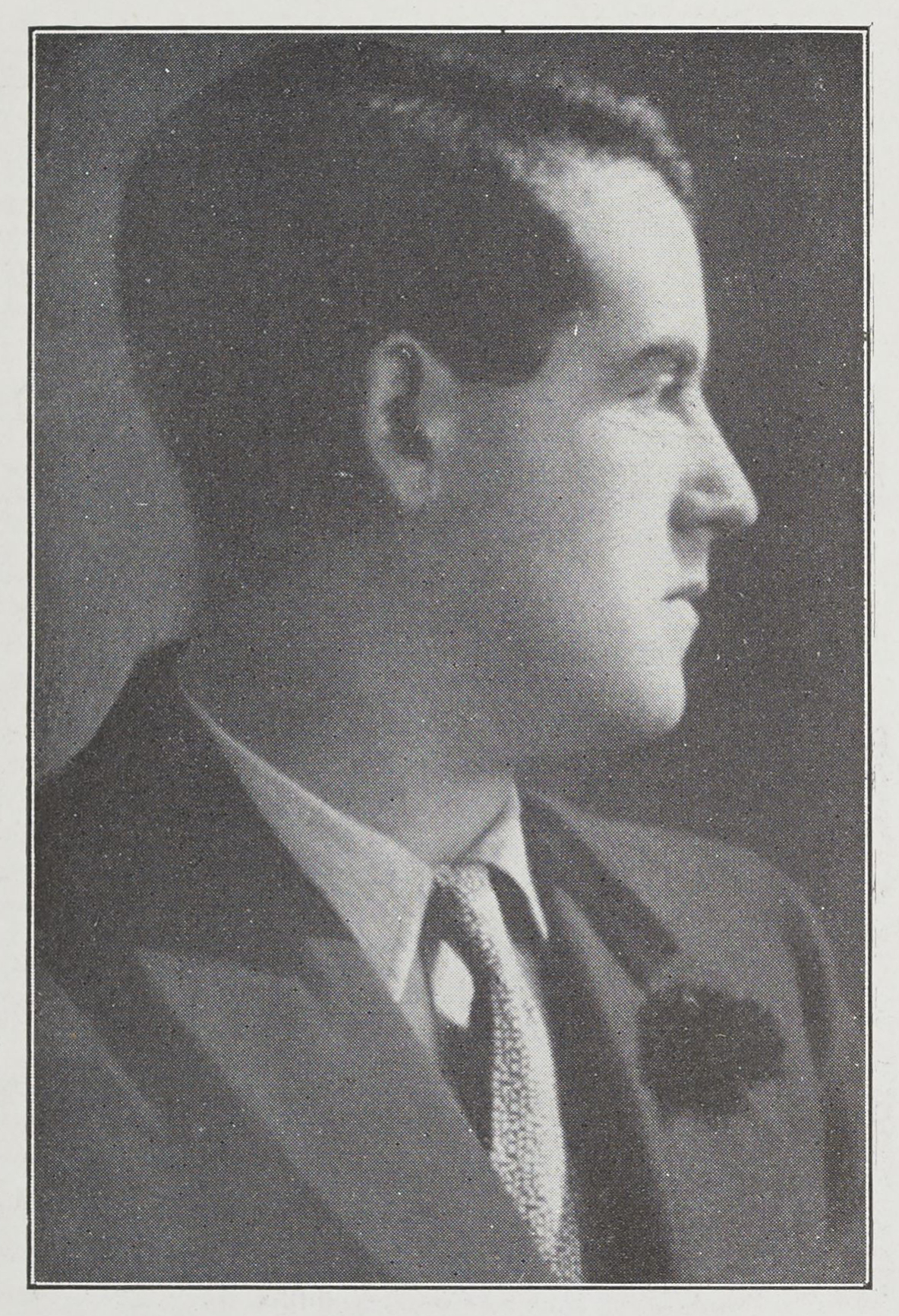
Maurice Sachs

Maurice Sachs (born Maurice Ettinghausen, 16 September 1906 – 14 April 1945) was a French-Jewish writer.

== Biography ==
Sachs was the son of a Jewish family of jewelers. He was educated in an English-style boarding-school, lived for a year in London and worked in a bookshop, and returned to Paris.

In 1925 he converted to Catholicism and decided to become a priest, though this didn't last upon meeting a young man on the beach at Juan-les-Pins.

After involvement in a number of dubious business activities, he traveled to New York City, where he passed himself off as an art dealer. Returning to Paris, he associated himself with leading homosexual writers of the time – Jean Cocteau, André Gide, and Max Jacob – with all of whom he had stormy relationships whose precise nature is unclear. At various times he worked for Jean Cocteau and Coco Chanel, in both cases stealing from them.

He associated with Violette Leduc who describes her friendship with him in her autobiography La Bâtarde. She describes the writing, and her reading of the first version of Le Sabbat in La Batarde (pages 380–400) and how she tried to get him, unsuccessfully, to remove harsh references to Jean Cocteau.

During the early years of the Occupation, he made money out of helping Jewish families escape to the Unoccupied Zone. He may also have been an informer for the Gestapo. He was later imprisoned in Fuhlsbüttel.

== Death ==
In 1945, before the advance of British troops, the prison of Fuhlsbüttel was evacuated and its inmates moved to the city of Kiel. The evacuation consisted of a long march that took many days to complete. On the third day of the journey, April 14, 1945, at 11:00 in the morning, Sachs became too exhausted to continue the march. He was killed by a bullet through his neck, and his body was abandoned at the side of the road with the body of another "companion of the same misfortune." Said Emmanuel Pollaud-Dulian about Sachs, "He does not show much compassion for the Jewish people, and deplores their resignation, which seems to be the dominant feature of their character. On the countryside, when passing a herd of sheep, he sighs sadly saying, 'the Jews...' The drama he plays does not escape him. But, trapped in his state of amorality, Sachs does not believe in the existence of innocent victims."

== Works ==
- Alias, 1935. ISBN B0000DQN60.
- André Gide, 1936. ISBN B0000DQN0W.
- Au Temps du Boeuf sur le Toit, 1939 (illustrated by Jean Hugo) and 2005. ISBN 2-246-38822-8.
- Chronique joyeuse et scandaleuse (Joyous and Scandalous Chronicle), Corrêa, 1950. ISBN B0000DS4FF.
- Correspondence, 1925–1939, Gallimard, Paris 2003 ISBN 2-07-073354-8.
- Histoire de John Cooper d'Albany (The Story of John Cooper of Albany), Gallimard, Paris 1955. ISBN B0000DNJVG.
- La chasse à courre (The Hunt), Gallimard, Paris 1997 ISBN 2-07-040278-9.
- La décade de l'illusion (The Decade of Illusion), Gallimard, Paris 1950. ISBN B0000DL12G.
- Le Sabbat. Souvenirs d'une jeunesse orageuse (The Sabbath. Memories of a Stormy Youth), Éditions Corrêa, Paris 1946. ISBN 2-07-028724-6. Translated as Day of Wrath by Robin King, Arthur Barker, London, 1953
- Tableaux des moeurs de ce temps (Table of Manners of This Time), Gallimard, Paris 1954. ISBN B0000DL12I.

== Trivia ==
A shot of the cover of Sachs's novel Abracadabra (1952) momentarily occupies the entire screen during a crucial episode of Breathless, a classic film by Jean-Luc Godard.
