= Vilcey-sur-Trey =

- Commune
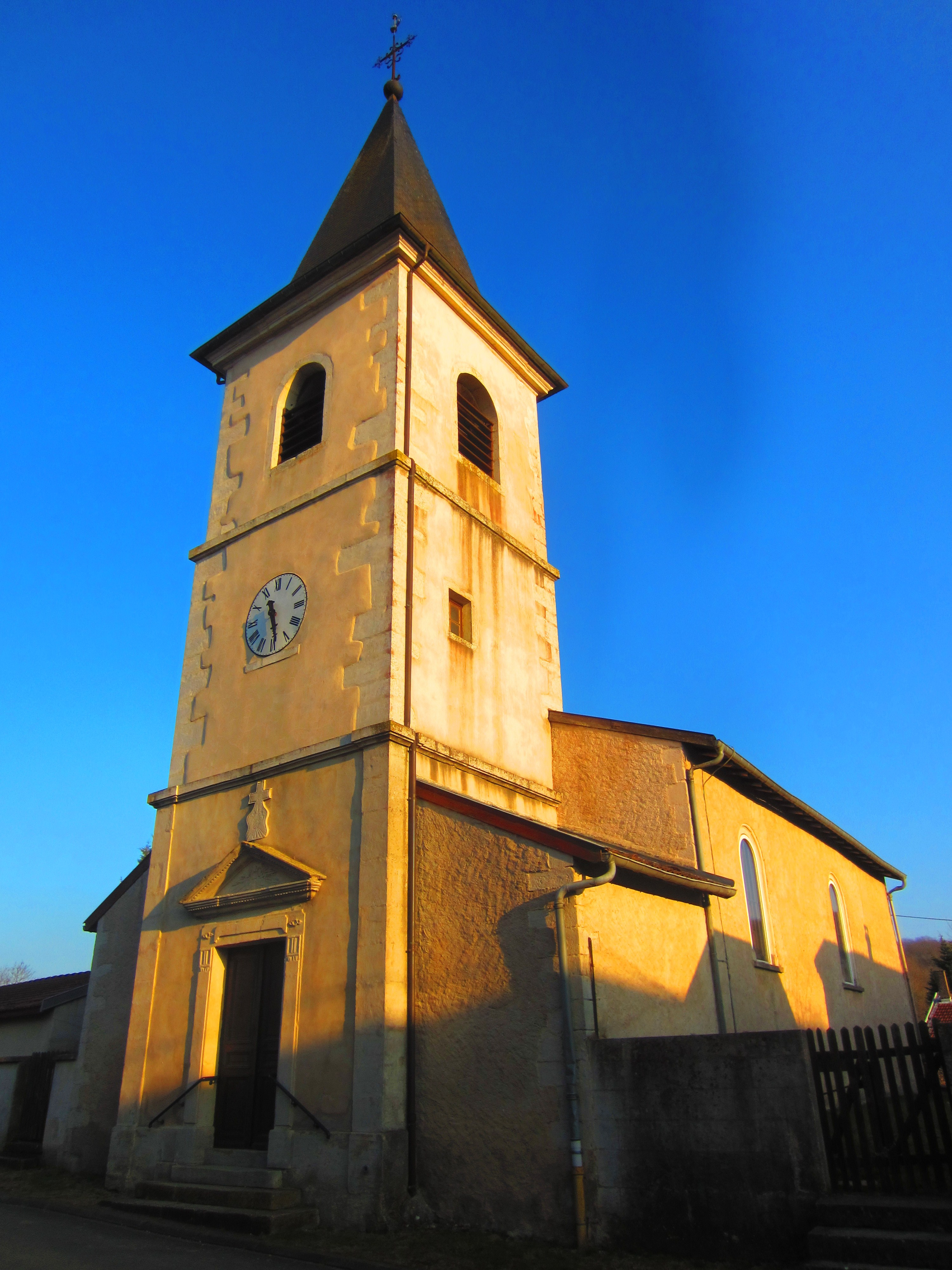
- The church in Vilcey-sur-Trey

- Coat of arms
- Location of Vilcey-sur-Trey
- Location within France Location within Grand Est
- Coordinates: 48°56′05″N 5°58′29″E
- Country: France
- Region: Grand Est
- Department: Meurthe-et-Moselle
- Arrondissement: Toul
- Canton: Le Nord-Toulois

Government
  - Mayor (2020–2026): Sylvain Aubriot
- Area^{1}: 13.17 km^{2} (5.08 sq mi)
- Elevation: 231 m (758 ft)
- Highest elevation: 362 m (1,188 ft)
- Lowest elevation: 216 m (709 ft)
- Population (2023): 145
  - Density: 11.0/km^{2} (28.5/sq mi)
- Time zone: UTC+01:00 (CET)
  - Summer (DST): UTC+02:00 (CEST)
- INSEE/Postal code: 54566 /54700
- ^{1} French Land Register data, which excludes lakes, ponds, glaciers > 1 km^{2} (0.386 sq mi or 247 acres) and river estuaries.

Vilcey-sur-Trey (French pronunciation: [vilsɛ syʁ tʁɛ]) is a commune in the Meurthe-et-Moselle department in north-eastern France.

== See also ==
- Communes of the Meurthe-et-Moselle department
- Parc naturel régional de Lorraine
