= Charles Péguy =

French poet, essayist, and editor (1873–1914)

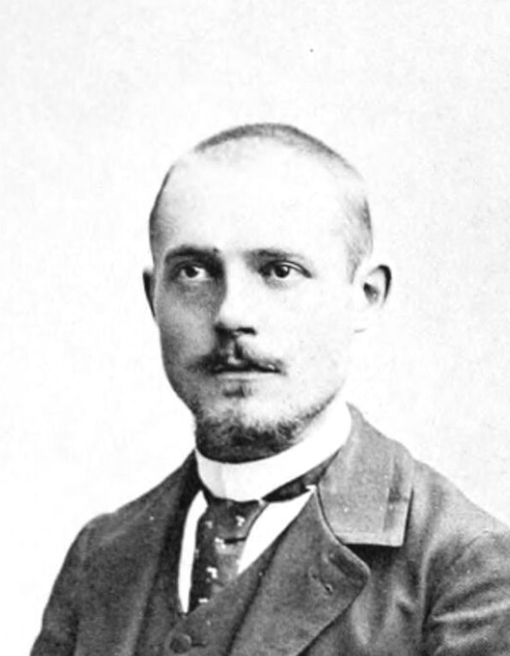
- Charles Péguy photographed by Eugène Pirou
- Born: Charles-Pierre Péguy; 7 January 1873; Orléans, France
- Died: 5 September 1914 (aged 41); Villeroy, France
- Education: École Normale Supérieure
- Occupation: Writer
- Military career
- Allegiance: France
- Branch: French Army
- Service years: 1914
- Rank: Lieutenant
- Conflicts: World War I; Western Front

Signature
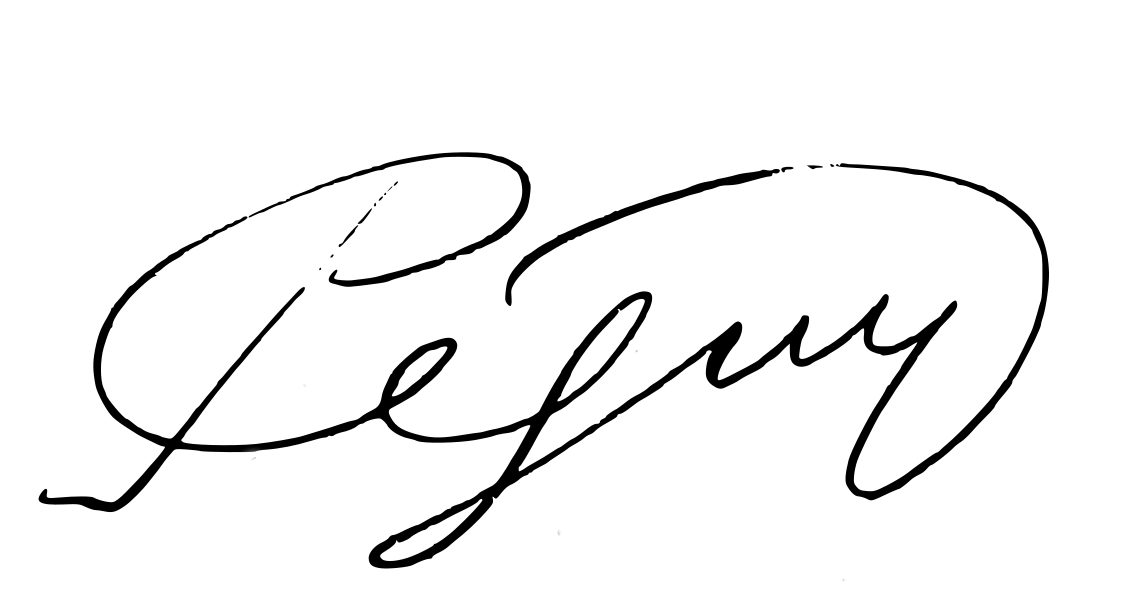

Charles Pierre Péguy (French: [ʃaʁl(ə) peɡi]; 7 January 1873 – 5 September 1914) was a French poet, essayist, and editor. His two main philosophies were socialism and nationalism; by 1908 at the latest, after years of uneasy agnosticism, he had become a believing (but generally non-practicing) Catholic. From that time, Catholicism strongly influenced his works. Péguy was killed in World War I at age 41 by German invading forces near Villeroy, Seine-et-Marne.

== Biography ==
Péguy was born into poverty in Orléans. His mother Cécile, widowed when he was an infant, mended chairs for a living. His father Désiré Péguy was a cabinet maker, and had died in 1874 as a result of combat wounds. Péguy studied at the Lycée Lakanal in Sceaux, winning a scholarship to the École normale supérieure (Paris). There he attended notably the lectures of Henri Bergson and Romain Rolland, whom he befriended. He formally left without graduating, in 1897, though he continued attending some lectures in 1898. Influenced by Lucien Herr, librarian of the École Normale Supérieure, he became an ardent Dreyfusard.

In 1897, Péguy married Charlotte-Françoise Baudoin. They had one daughter and three sons, one of whom was born after Péguy's death. Around 1910 he fell deeply in love with Blanche Raphael, a young Jewish friend; however, he was faithful to his wife.

From his earliest years, he was influenced by socialism. He joined the Socialist Party in 1895. From 1900 until his death in 1914, he was the main contributor to and editor of the literary magazine Les Cahiers de la Quinzaine, which at first supported the Socialist Party director Jean Jaurès. However, Péguy ultimately ended this support after he began viewing Jaurès as a traitor to the nation and to socialism. In the Cahiers, Péguy published not only his own essays and poetry, but also works by such important contemporary authors as Romain Rolland.

His free-verse poem, "Portico of the Mystery of the Second Virtue", has gone through more than 60 editions in France. It was a favourite book of Charles de Gaulle.

When the First World War broke out, Péguy became a lieutenant in the 19th company of the French 276th Infantry Regiment.

== Death ==
Péguy died in battle, shot in the forehead, near Villeroy, Seine-et-Marne on the day before the beginning of the First Battle of the Marne. He is recognised as Mort pour la France. There is a memorial to Péguy near the field where he was killed.

== Influence ==
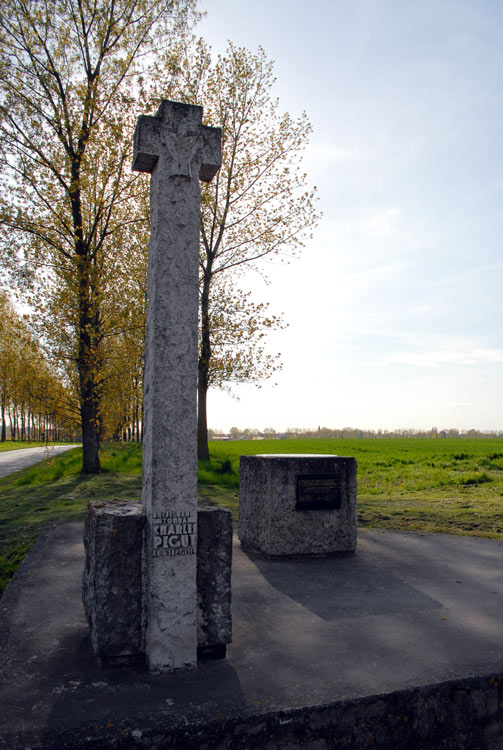
Charles Péguy Memorial

During the Second World War both supporters and opponents of Vichy France cited Péguy. Edmond Michelet was the first of many members of the French Resistance to quote Péguy; de Gaulle, familiar with Péguy's writing, quoted him in a 1942 speech. Those who opposed Vichy's anti-Semitism laws often cited him. By contrast, Robert Brasillach praised Péguy as a "French National Socialist", and Péguy's sons Pierre and Marcel wrote that their father was an inspiration for Vichy's National Revolution ideology and "above all, a racist". It has been written that Péguy would likely have been horrified by his future influence on fascism.

The English novelist Graham Greene alluded to Péguy in Brighton Rock (1938), while The Heart of the Matter (1948) has as its epigraph a quotation from Péguy. In The Lawless Roads Greene refers to Péguy "challenging God in the cause of the damned".

The Swiss theologian Hans Urs von Balthasar, in the course of describing the history of art as a sometimes more and sometimes less successful approximation of God's creativeness, noted that Péguy's Eve was a "theological redemption of the project of Proust", meaning that where Proust had memory and charity, the Eve of Péguy – not necessarily Péguy – had memory, charity and knowledge of the redemption of God.

The cultural anthropologist Ernest Becker described Péguy's religious conversion as an "authentic rebirth [that] is a real ejection from paradise[.] [...] It takes men of granite, men who were automatically powerful, 'secure in their drivenness' [...] and it makes them tremble, makes them cry–as Péguy stood on the platforms of Parisian busses with hot tears rolling down his cheeks while he mumbled prayers."

English poet Geoffrey Hill published a book-length poem in 1983 in homage to Péguy, entitled The Mystery of the Charity of Charles Péguy.

Péguy and his take on the notion of exponential cultural renovation are referenced in Chapter Seven of Richard Powers' 1985 novel Three Farmers on Their Way to a Dance.

French philosopher Gilles Deleuze references Péguy seven times in his 1968 book Difference and Repetition.

== Works ==
Essays

- (1901). De la Raison.
- (1902). De Jean Coste.
- (1905). Notre Patrie.
- (1907–08). Situations.
- (1910). Notre Jeunesse.
- (1910). Victor-Marie, Comte Hugo.
- (1911). Un Nouveau Théologien.
- (1913). L'Argent.
- (1913). L'Argent Suite.
- (1914). Note sur M. Bergson et la Philosophie Bergsonienne.
- (1914). Note Conjointe sur M. Descartes et la Philosophie Cartésienne (posth.)
- (1931). Clio. Dialogue de l'Histoire et de l'âme Païenne (posth.)
- (1972). Véronique. Dialogue de l'Histoire et de l'âme Charnelle. Paris: Gallimard (posth.)

Poetry

- (1912). Le Porche du Mystère de la Deuxième Vertu.
- (1913). La Tapisserie de Sainte Geneviève et de Jeanne d'Arc.
- (1913). La Tapisserie de Notre-Dame.
- (1913). Ève.

Plays

- (1897). Jeanne d'Arc. Paris: Librairie de la Revue Socialiste.
- (1910). Le Mystère de la Charité de Jeanne d'Arc.
- (1912). Le Mystère des Saints Innocents.

Miscellany

- (1927). Lettres et Entretiens (posth.)
- (1980). Correspondance, 1905–1914: Charles Péguy – Pierre Marcel. Paris: Minard (posth.)

Collected works

- (1916–55). Œuvres Complètes de Charles-Péguy. Paris: Gallimard (20 vols.)
- (1941). Œuvres Poétiques Complètes. Bibliothèque de la Pléiade: Gallimard.
- (1987–92). Œuvres en Prose Complètes:
  - Tome I. Bibliothèque de la Pléiade: Gallimard, 1987.
  - Tome II. Bibliothèque de la Pléiade: Gallimard, 1988.
  - Tome III. Bibliothèque de la Pléiade: Gallimard, 1992.

=== Works in English translation ===
- (1943). "Freedom," Commonweal, 8 January, p. 293.
- (1943). Basic Verities. Prose and Poetry, Trans. by Ann and Julien Green. New York: Pantheon Books Inc.
- (1944). Man and Saints. Prose and Poetry, Trans. by Ann and Julien Green. New York: Pantheon Books Inc.
- (1950). The Mystery of the Charity of Joan of Arc, Trans. by Julien Green. New York: Pantheon Books Inc. [London: Hollis & Carter, 1950; Carcanet, 1986].
- (1956). The Mystery of the Holy Innocents, Trans. by Pansy Pakenham. London: The Harvill Press [New York: Harper, 1956].
  - (1999). "The Mystery of the Holy Innocents," Communio 26 (2).
- (1958). Temporal and Eternal, Tran. by Alexander Dru. London: The Harvill Press [New York: Harper, 1958; Liberty Fund, 2001].
- (1964). A Vision of Prayer. Mount Saint Bernard Abbey: Saint Bernard Press.
- (1965). God Speaks. New York: Pantheon Books Inc.
- (1970). The Portico of the Mystery of the Second Virtue, Trans. by Dorothy Brown Aspinwall. Metuchen, N.J.: Scarecrow Press.
  - (1994). "On the Mystery of Hope," Communio 21 (3).
  - (1996). The Portal of the Mystery of Hope, Trans. by David Louis Schindler Jr. Edinburgh: T. & T. Clark [Wm. B. Eerdmans Publishing Co., 2003; Continuum, 2005].
- (2009). "On Money," Communio 36 (3).
- (2019). Notes on Bergson and Descartes. Eugene: Veritas [Cascade Books].

== See also ==
- Abbey de Sainte-Marie-au-Bois
