= Pierre-Frédéric Dorian =

French master blacksmith and politician

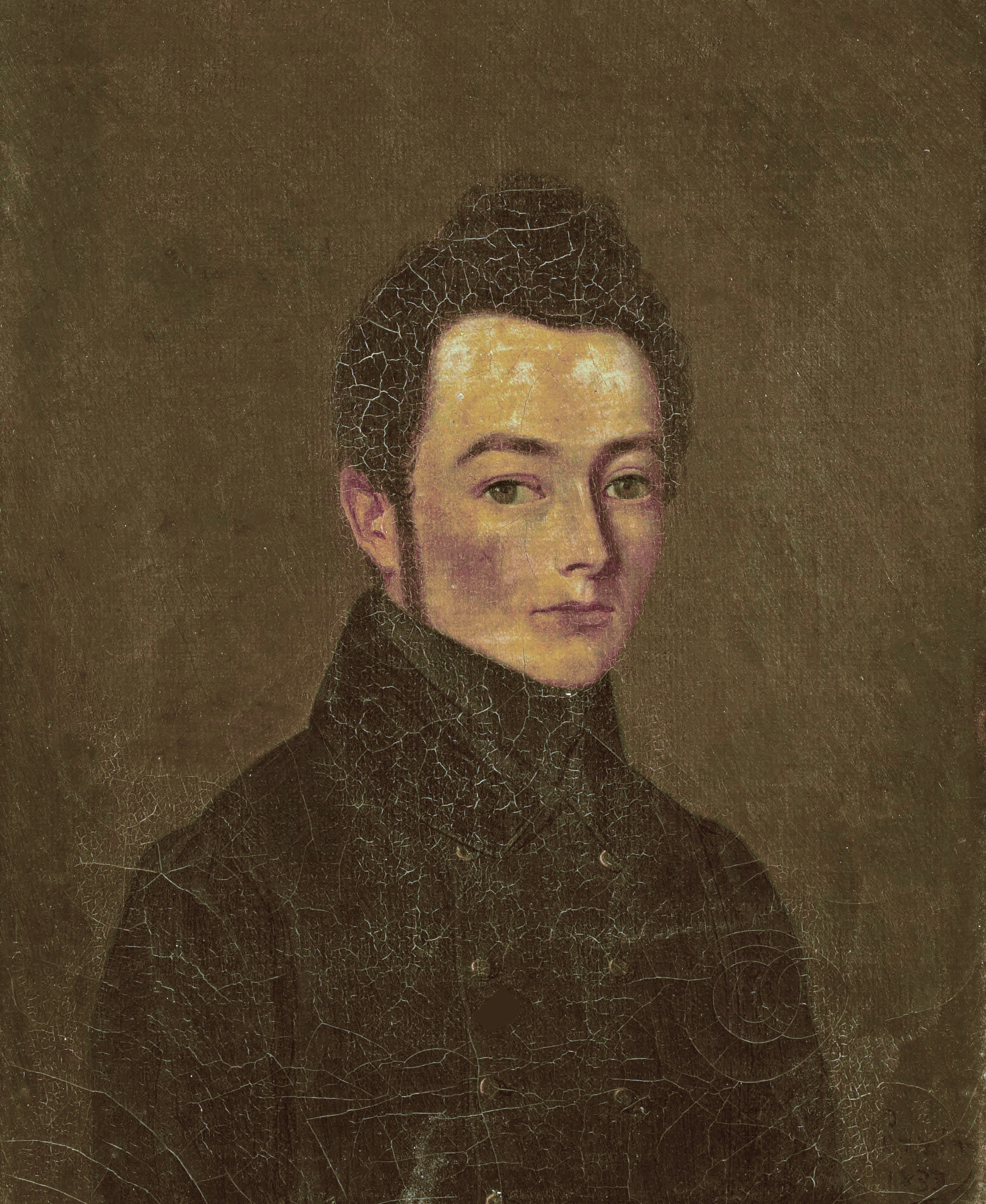
- Painting of Pierre-Frédéric Dorian, signed Perrin 1839

Minister of Public Works
- In office 4 September 1870 – 19 February 1871
- Preceded by: Jérôme David
- Succeeded by: Roger de Larcy

Personal details
- Born: 24 January 1814 Montbéliard, France
- Died: 14 April 1873 (aged 59) Paris, France
- Relatives: Pauline Ménard-Dorian (granddaughter)
- Occupation: Politician, blacksmith

Pierre-Frédéric Dorian (24 January 1814 in Montbéliard, Doubs – 14 April 1873 in Paris) was a French master blacksmith and radical Republican leader. He served as minister of public works from 4 September 1870 – 19 February 1871. He was the grandfather of Pauline Ménard-Dorian.

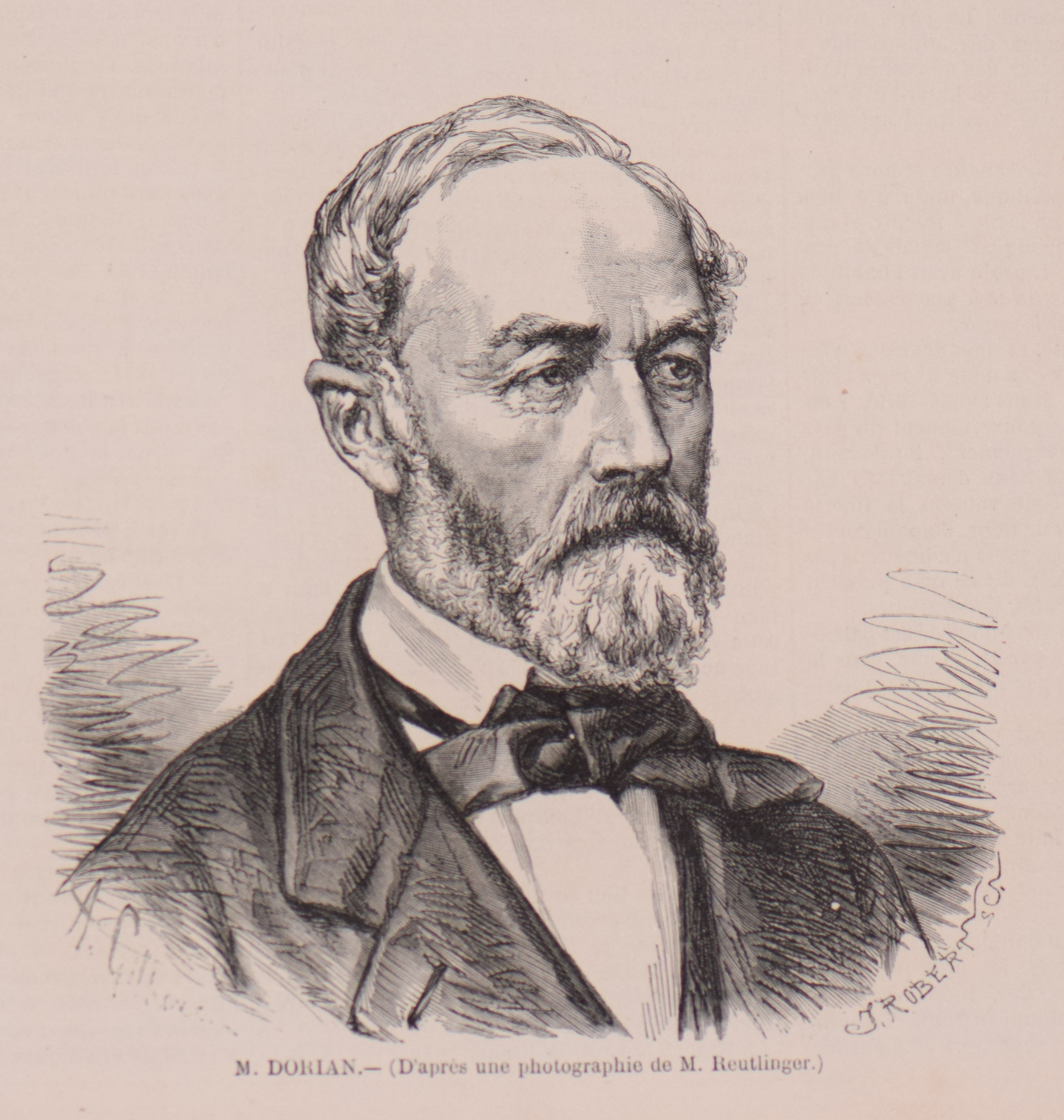
Radical Republican leader of the 1871 Paris Commune
