= Phlin =

- Commune
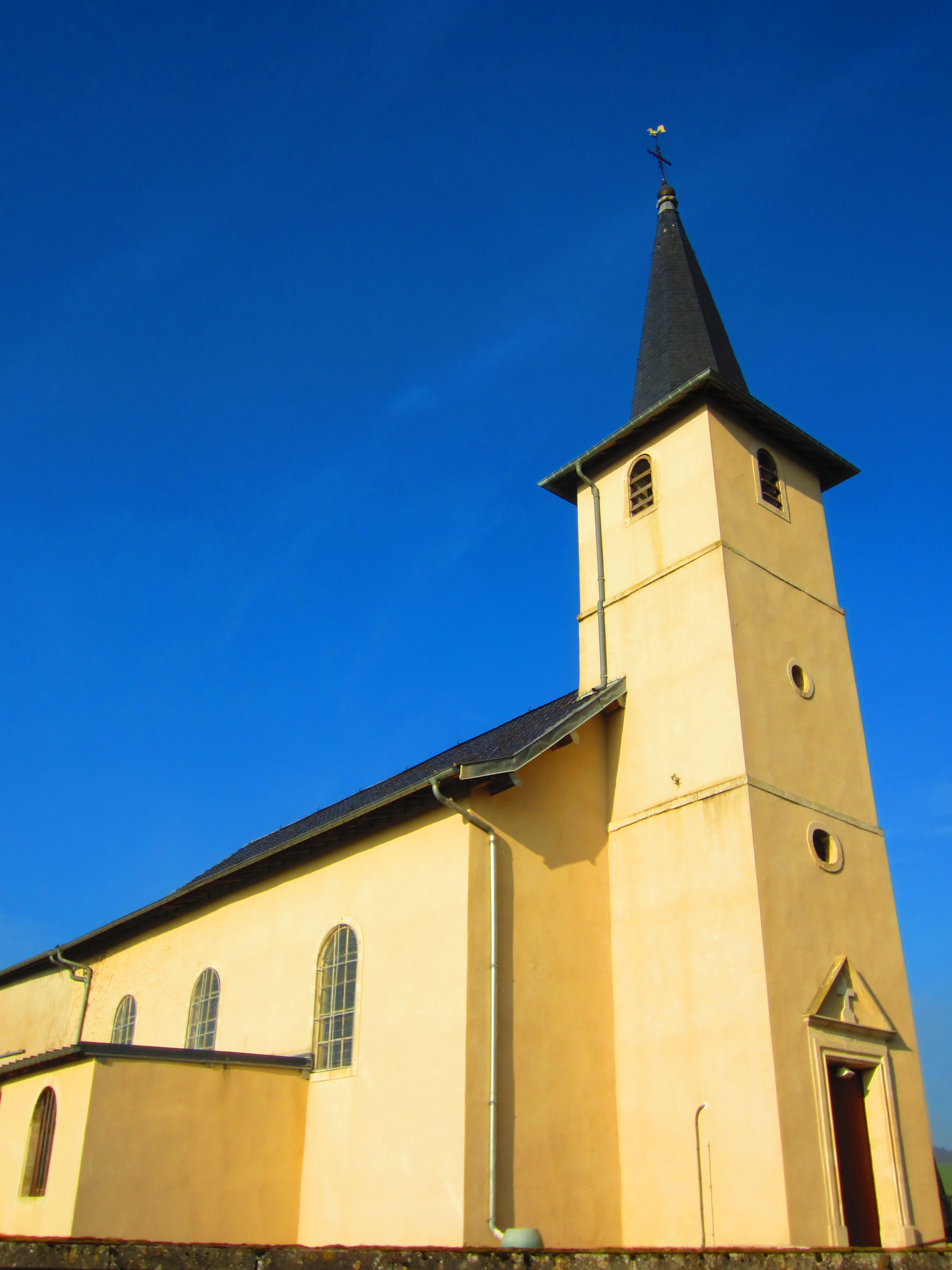
- The church in Phlin

- Coat of arms
- Location of Phlin
- Location within France Location within Grand Est
- Coordinates: 48°54′46″N 6°16′40″E
- Country: France
- Region: Grand Est
- Department: Meurthe-et-Moselle
- Arrondissement: Nancy
- Canton: Entre Seille et Meurthe
- Intercommunality: Seille et Grand Couronné

Government
  - Mayor (2020–2026): Olivier Michel
- Area^{1}: 3.7 km^{2} (1.4 sq mi)
- Elevation: 190 m (620 ft)
- Highest elevation: 273 m (896 ft)
- Lowest elevation: 184 m (604 ft)
- Population (2023): 40
  - Density: 11/km^{2} (28/sq mi)
- Time zone: UTC+01:00 (CET)
  - Summer (DST): UTC+02:00 (CEST)
- INSEE/Postal code: 54424 /54610
- ^{1} French Land Register data, which excludes lakes, ponds, glaciers > 1 km^{2} (0.386 sq mi or 247 acres) and river estuaries.

Phlin (French pronunciation: [flɛ̃]) is a commune in the Meurthe-et-Moselle department in north-eastern France.

== See also ==
- Communes of the Meurthe-et-Moselle department
