= Viéville-en-Haye =

- Commune
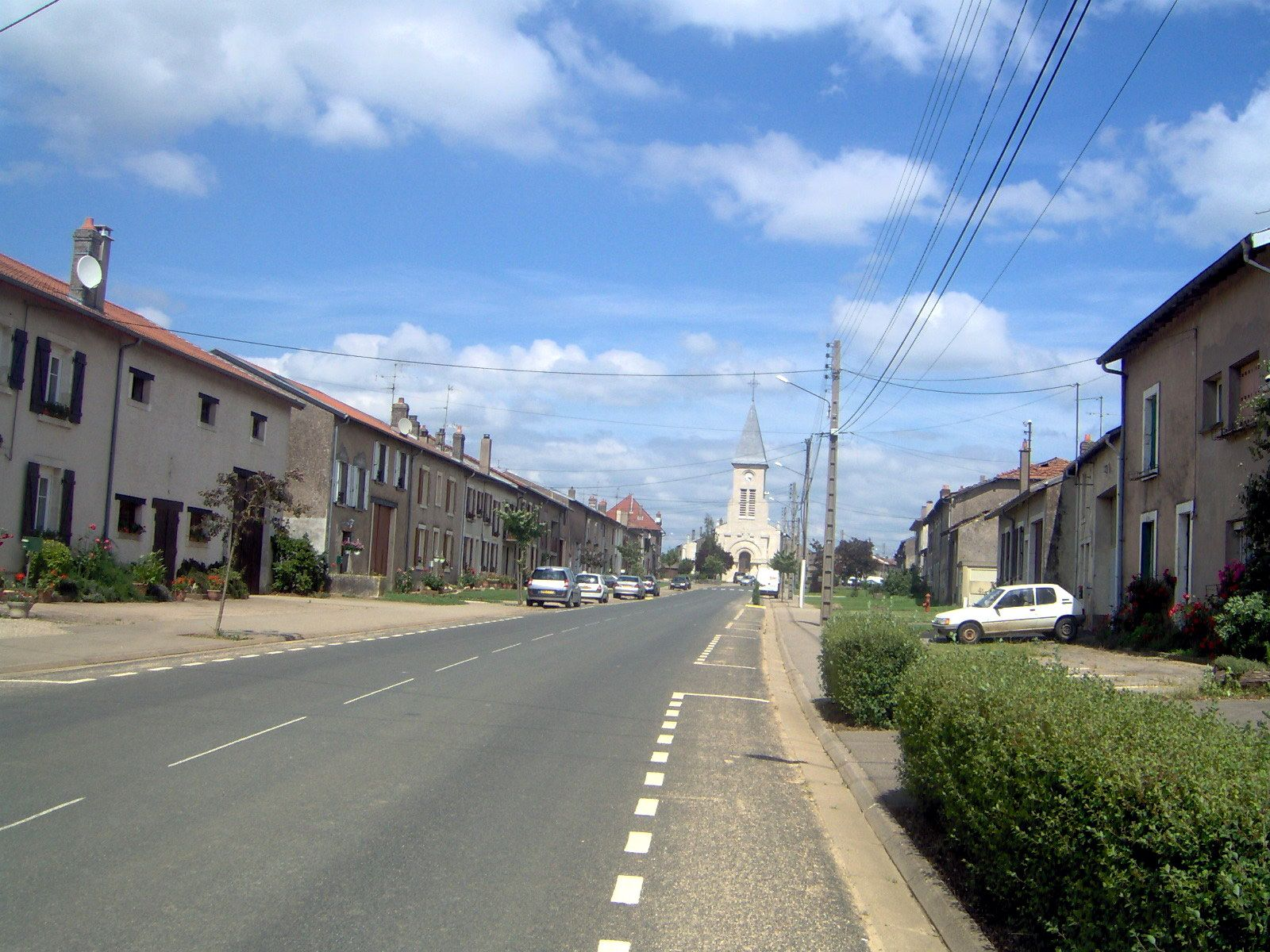
- A view within Viéville-en-Haye

- Coat of arms
- Location of Viéville-en-Haye
- Location within France Location within Grand Est
- Coordinates: 48°56′37″N 5°55′38″E
- Country: France
- Region: Grand Est
- Department: Meurthe-et-Moselle
- Arrondissement: Toul
- Canton: Le Nord-Toulois
- Intercommunality: Mad et Moselle

Government
  - Mayor (2020–2026): Marc Martinoli
- Area^{1}: 8.54 km^{2} (3.30 sq mi)
- Elevation: 345 m (1,132 ft)
- Highest elevation: 357 m (1,171 ft)
- Lowest elevation: 270 m (890 ft)
- Population (2023): 141
  - Density: 16.5/km^{2} (42.8/sq mi)
- Time zone: UTC+01:00 (CET)
  - Summer (DST): UTC+02:00 (CEST)
- INSEE/Postal code: 54564 /54470
- ^{1} French Land Register data, which excludes lakes, ponds, glaciers > 1 km^{2} (0.386 sq mi or 247 acres) and river estuaries.

Viéville-en-Haye (French pronunciation: [vjevil ɑ̃ ɛ]) is a commune in the Meurthe-et-Moselle department in north-eastern France.

== See also ==
- Communes of the Meurthe-et-Moselle department
- Parc naturel régional de Lorraine
