= Aimargues =

Commune in Occitanie, France

- Commune
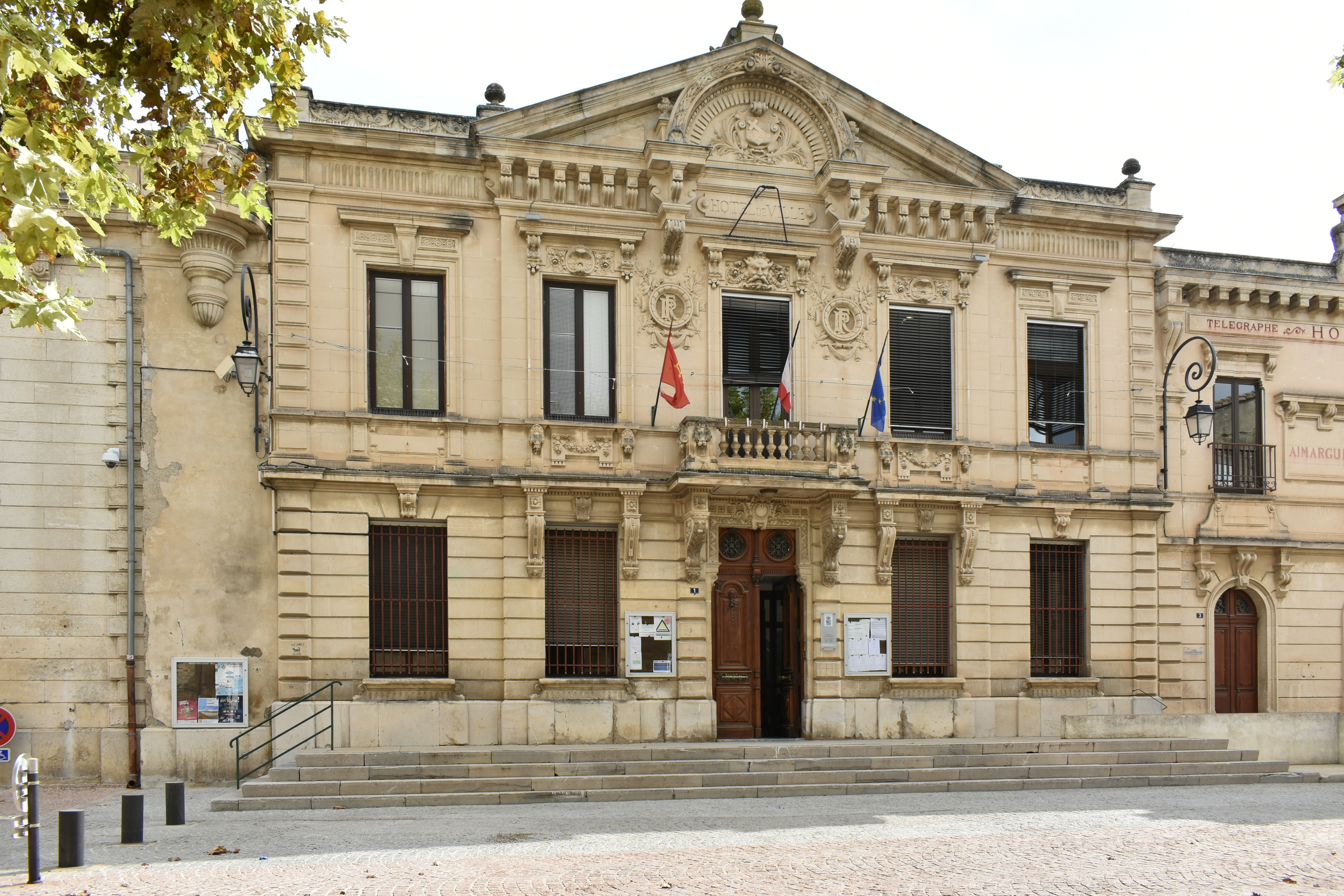
- Town hall

- Coat of arms
- Location of Aimargues
- Location within France Location within Occitanie
- Coordinates: 43°41′09″N 4°12′33″E
- Country: France
- Region: Occitania
- Department: Gard
- Arrondissement: Nîmes
- Canton: Aigues-Mortes
- Intercommunality: Petite Camargue

Government
  - Mayor (2020–2026): Jean-Paul Franc
- Area^{1}: 26.48 km^{2} (10.22 sq mi)
- Elevation: 7 m (23 ft)
- Highest elevation: 13 m (43 ft)
- Lowest elevation: 3 m (9.8 ft)
- Population (2023): 5,705
  - Density: 215.4/km^{2} (558.0/sq mi)
- Time zone: UTC+01:00 (CET)
  - Summer (DST): UTC+02:00 (CEST)
- INSEE/Postal code: 30006 /30470
- ^{1} French Land Register data, which excludes lakes, ponds, glaciers > 1 km^{2} (0.386 sq mi or 247 acres) and river estuaries.

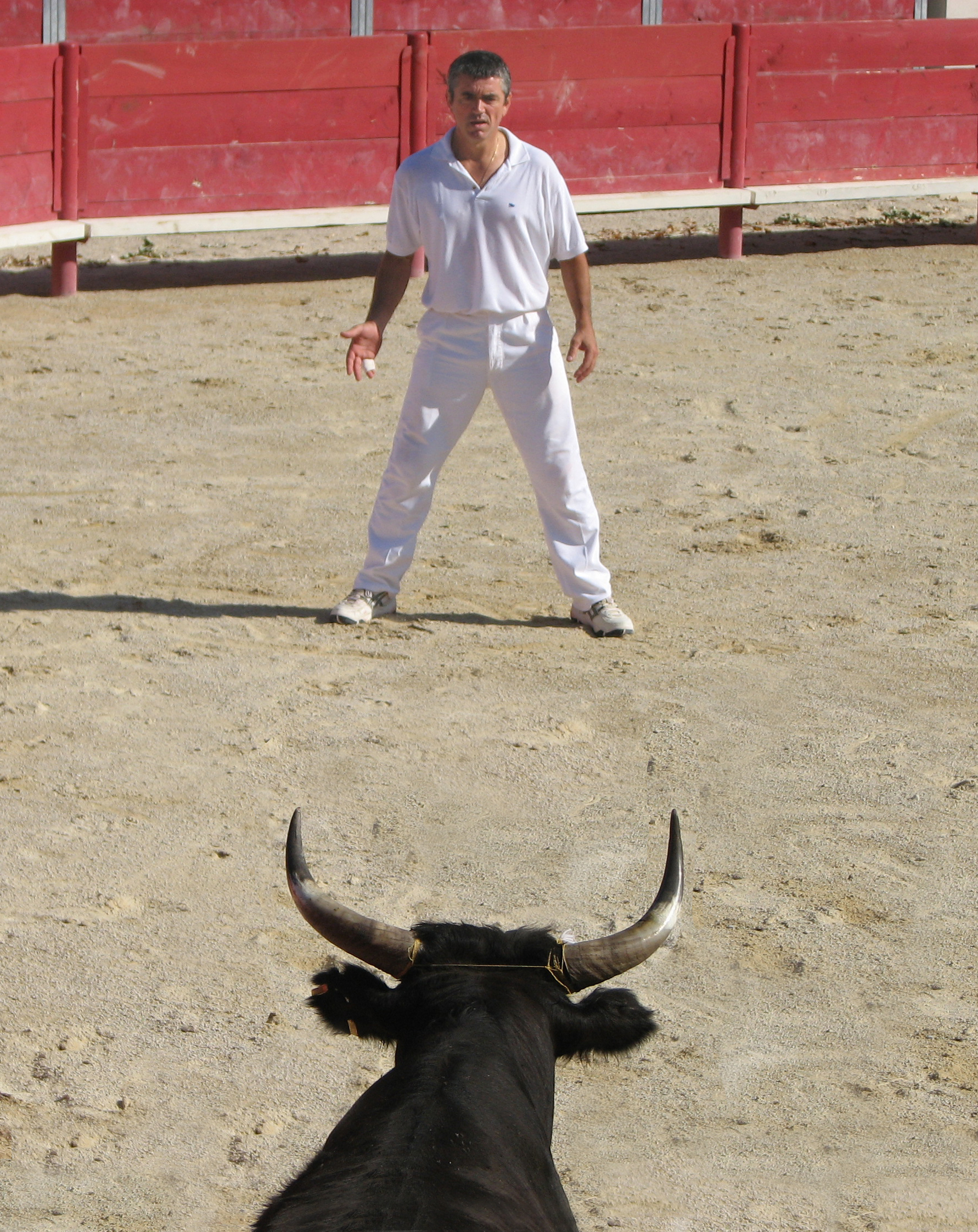
Cocardier facing a bull at the Course camarguaise at Aimargues

Aimargues (French pronunciation: [ɛmaʁɡ]) is a commune in the Gard department in southern France. The town of Aimargues may have Roman origins and is situated beside the river Vidourle on the floodplain of the Rhône. Traditionally it has been an agricultural and wine-producing community but it now also has a number of new industries and employers who benefit from excellent road connections to the north of France as well as to Spain and Italy.

== Geography ==
Located some 26 km (16 mi) to the southwest of Nîmes, close to the border with the Hérault department, Aimargues can be easily accessed from the nearby Autoroute A9. Aimargues station has rail connections to Nîmes and Le Grau-du-Roi.

The Petite Camargue is an area of wetlands on the west side of the delta of the Rhône River in southern France. Aimargues is a small town in the Petite Camargue beside the River Vidourle which rises in the Cévennes Mountains to the northwest. Some 6,000 years BC much of the interior of the Petite Carmargue was occupied by a lagoon, l’étang de l’or, which was separated from the sea by a sandy bar. Since then the lake has become progressively silted up. The countryside around Aimargues is flat and the soil is rich, being accumulated sediment brought down the River Rhône and deposited in its delta and surrounding area during flooding. As well as agricultural land there are levees, creeks, marshes, brackish ponds, lagoons and dunes in the area.

== History ==
The suffix "argues" suggests that the town of Aimargues has been in existence since antiquity. It was probably named after the Roman military commander Flavius Armatus. It is unclear when exactly Aimargues castle was built but it was in existence before 1185. King Louis IX is said to have set out for the Crusades from the town. In the 13th century, a census showed that the town had become a bustling community with 522 homes, indicating a population of over 2,000 people. In 1565, the area came under the rule of the house of Crussol and Viscount d'Uzès made it one of the main strongholds of the Lower Vistrenque. Louis XIII ordered the destruction of the city walls. In the early 18th century, Jean Charles de Crussol included Baron d'Aymargues among his titles.

The town has developed from an initial central core. This is self-contained and not traversed by routes extending from one side of the town to the other. It was originally surrounded by the city wall, has the château in its northwest corner and the church, reconstructed in the nineteenth century, in its centre. This ancient part is surrounded by another zone that also has tightly packed houses and narrow streets. The outer suburbs are modern.

== Landmarks ==
The Commune of Aimargues has several buildings of historic interest:

- The Château de Teillan located 2 km to the south of the village is an old Roman castrum originally called "Villa Telliamis". It subsequently belonged to Psalmody Abbey before it was acquired by the Bornier family. Today's building dates from the second half of the 16th century with some 17th-century additions. It became a listed historic monument in 1992.
- The Mas de Malherbes, property of the Ménard-Dorian family, linked to the Victor Hugo one.
- The former 17th-century parish church was converted into an indoor market at the end of the 19th century. Now known as the Salle Georges Brassens, it is used as an exhibition centre.

The village also has schools, nurseries, a library, a youth centre and an adult leisure centre. There is a bullfighting arena where the "course camarguaise" takes place. In the traditional fights held here, the bull is not killed but an unarmed raseteur attempts to snatch a rosette from between its horns.

== Population ==
Historical population
Year	Pop.	±% p.a.
1968	2,252	—
1975	2,218	−0.22%
1982	2,547	+2.00%
1990	2,988	+2.02%
1999	3,442	+1.58%
2007	4,227	+2.60%
2012	4,822	+2.67%
2017	5,647	+3.21%
2023	5,705	+0.17%
Source: INSEE

== Economy ==
While agriculture and wine production are still important contributors to the local economy, more recent players such as Royal Canin, the dog and cat food producer, Itesoft, a software company, and the underwear company Éminence are also important employers, benefitting from easy access to the motorway with connections to Italy and Spain as well as to the north of France.

== Mayors ==
- Under French Revolution :
  - Jean-Baptiste Lancry de La Loyelle, first mayor elected (moderate, January–October 1790);
  - Charles Carbonnier (moderate, November 1790-November 1791);
  - Marc-Antoine Boissier (moderate, November 1791-December 1792);
  - Pierre Boissière senior (moderate, December 1792-October 1793);
  - Pierre Fontanès (jacobin, October 1793-May 1795);
  - Guillaume Carbonnier junior (moderate, May 1795-1800);
- Under Consulate and French Empire :
  - Antoine Prouzet junior (moderate, May 1800-September 1805);
  - Jean-Baptiste Roussellier (moderate, September 1805;
  - Pierre Paulet (1805–1808);
  - Antoine Prouzet junior (moderate, 1808-January 1813);
  - Étienne de Bonafoux (ultraroyalist, January 1813-April 1815);
- Guillaume Carbonnier-Bousquet (moderate, April–July 1815);
- Under the Bourbon Restoration :
  - Étienne de Bonafoux (ultraroyalist, July 1815-February 1819) ;
  - Jean-Baptiste Roussellier (liberal, March 1819-January 1824);
  - Louis-Auguste de Galhaut (royalist, January 1924-October 1830);
- Under the July Monarchy :
  - Étienne de Besson (moderate royalist, October 1830-January 1831);
  - Jean-Pierre Prouzet (orleanist, January 1831-December 1832);
  - Guillaume Carbonnier-Bousquet (liberal, January 1833-March 1837);
  - Pierre Gautier (royalist, July–October 1837);
  - Léonce Allut (orleanist, June 1838-February 1848);
  - Maurice de Cray (royalist, March 1848-?);
- From 1848 to 1905 (Second and Third Republic) :

to complete

- From 1905 to 1944 :
  - Léon Fontanieu (socialist, March 1905-October 1907);
  - Louis Barbusse (socialist, December 1907-May 1908);
  - Jean Joujou (anarcho-syndicalist, May 1908-October 1910);
  - Barbier, leader of the municipal commission (independent politician, November 1910-January 1911);
  - Louis Pioch (socialist, 1911-?);
  - Augustin Pourreau (royalist, until 1919);
  - Pierre Jalabert (1919);
  - Augustin Pourreau (Action Française, v. 1920-1944);
- Since Liberation :
  - Leaders of the Comité de Libération :
    - Jean Jourdan (Anarchist, 1944);
    - René Bernard (1944);
    - Louis Guiraud (independent politician, 1944);
  - Roger de Lestrade, temporary mayor (1945);
  - Joseph Chatellier (PCF, 1945–1963);
  - Albert Fontanieu (SFIO, 1963–1977);
  - René Dupont (PCF, 1977–1989);
  - Jean Bruchet (Parti Socialiste, 1989–2008);
  - Jean-Paul Franc (independent politician, since March 2008).

== Sport ==
The commune's football team is the Stade Olympique of Aimargues (SOA). In the beginning of may a famous international tournament take place every year.

The local rugby team is Aimargues Rugby Club also named the Raouba-vesso.

There are in Aimargues two stadiums : Baptistin Guigue's Stadium and René Dupont's Stadium (former Bella Vista's Stadium); to equestrian centres; and the arena Léopold Dupont.

== Media ==
Aimargues has its own newspaper: Aimargues le journal, created in 2008.

Aimargues is also covered by the daily newspaper Midi Libre, by the local television TV SUD Camargue Cévennes et by France 3 Sud's programs.

== Religion ==
There are Catholic and Protestant churches in Aimargues.

The catholic parishes are parts of the deanery of Vauvert and the Diocese of Nîmes. The mass is assumed by deanery's desservants priests.

The Reformed Church of France maintains the Ensemble paroissial de Aimargues.

== Education ==
The public maternelle (preschool/nursery) is École Ventadour. The public primary school is École élémentaire publique Guillierme F.

The collège (junior high school) serving the community is Collège de Gallargues-le-Montueux, located in Gallargues-le-Montueux. In addition to Aimargues and Gallargues-le-Montueux, it also serves Aigues-Vives. It opened in September 2014. As of 2017 it has about 600 students.

There is also a private Catholic elementary school in Aimargues, École élémentaire privée Notre Dame des Gardians.

== Notable residents ==
- Georges de Coursule, baron de Saint-Rémy.
- Pierre Melchior d'Azémar (or d'Adhémar), prefect of Var.
- Louis-Étienne Ricard, politician.
- Jean-César Vincens-Plauchut, politician.
- François Joseph Pamphile de Lacroix (1774–1841), general.
- François-Isidore de Ricard, Louis-Étienne' son, politician.
- Paulin d'Anglas de Praviel.
- Charles de Surville, politician.
- Paul Ménard-Dorian, politician.
- Pauline Ménard-Dorian, writer, Marcel Proust's muse.
- Fanfonne Guillierme, manadière.
- Jean Jourdan, a.k.a. Chocho, anarchist militant.
- Gaston Bêchard, socialist militant, syndicalist.
- Michel Stahl, compagnon de la Libération, pastor of the Reformed Church.
- Léopold Dupont, raseteur.
- Pierre Torreilles, writer, poet, editor.
- Jean-François Galéa, painter.
- Michel Mathes, a.k.a. Michel Falguières, writer.
- Thierry Félix, raseteur.
- Laurent Pit, humorist.

== See also ==
- Communes of the Gard department
