= Parc naturel régional de Camargue =

Protected area in Camargue, France

Coordinates: 43°33′N 4°34′E

The Parc naturel régional de Camargue (Occitan: Parc natural regional de Camarga) is a protected area which was designated in 1970 along the shoreline of the Camargue, France. The park protects a wetland environment and an adjacent marine area. The boundaries of the park have been expanded to include a lagoon called the Étang de Vaccarès.

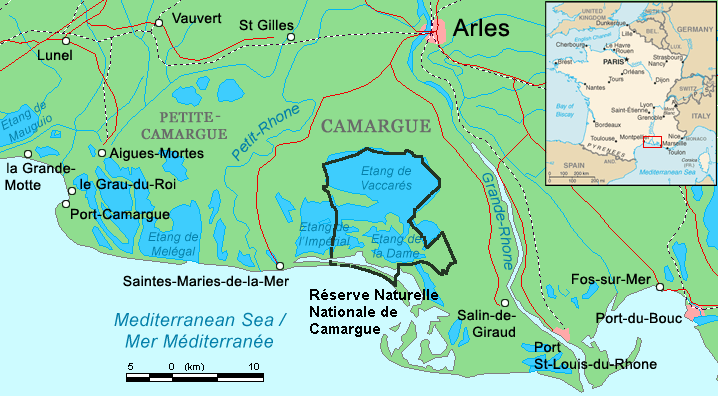
Map of the Camargue showing the location of the Étang de Vaccarès

The Camargue is also the site of a national nature reserve, and has been designated by UNESCO as a biosphere reserve.

== Twinning ==
The park is twinned with a Spanish wetland, the Doñana National Park at the mouth of the Guadalquivir. The two parks share a number of characteristics including significance for bird-life and semi-feral horses, and proximity to a pilgrimage site (Saintes-Maries-de-la-Mer and the Hermitage of El Rocío).

In 1992, the site was formally twinned with the Danube Delta Biosphere Reserve Ramsar site by an agreement between the governments of Romania and France. Ramsar site no. 521.

== See also ==
- Camargue cattle
- Camargue equitation
- Camargue horse
- Gardian
- Manade
