= Brava cattle =

French breed of cattle

Brava
- Conservation status: FAO (2007): not at risk
- Other names: Race de Combat; Brave; Espagnole Brava
- Country of origin: France
- Distribution: Camargue, Provence-Alpes-Côte d'Azur; Petite Camargue, Occitanie
- Standard: Parc naturel régional de Camargue (in French)
- Use: bull-fighting; beef

Traits
- Weight: Male: 400 kg; Female: 250 kg
- Height: Male: 125 cm; Female: 115 cm
- Coat: variable, usually black
- Horn status: horned in both sexes

Notes
- semi-feral
- Cattle; Bos (primigenius) taurus

The Brava or Race de Combat is a French breed of domestic cattle raised in the Camargue, the delta of the Rhône in southern France. It is bred specifically for bull-fighting, either Spanish-style (on foot) or Portuguese-style (on horseback). It is one of two cattle breeds raised in semi-feral conditions in the Camargue: the other is the Raço di Biòu or Camargue breed, which is not a fighting breed but is used in a bloodless bull-sport, the course camarguaise. The Brava derives from Iberian fighting cattle imported in the nineteenth century, and may also be known as the Espagnole Brava.

== History ==
The first introduction of breeding stock of Iberian fighting bulls to France was an importation to Arles in 1869 by Joseph Yonnet, a breeder; there were no further such imports until 1975. The Brava has long been raised in semi-feral conditions in the wetlands of the Camargue, in the département of Bouches-du-Rhône in the region of Provence-Alpes-Côte d'Azur, and of the Petite Camargue, in the département of Gard in the region of Occitanie. It is one of two cattle breeds raised in the area, the other being the Raço di Biòu or Camargue breed, which is not a fighting breed. Both are associated with the rural and cultural traditions of the Camargue, including the gardians, mounted herders who manage the livestock in manades, and the small white Camargue horses they ride. A breed society for the Brava was established in 1920.

In 1996, beef from the two breeds of the Camargue, or from cross-breeds between them, received Appellation d’Origine Contrôlée status as "Taureau de Camargue". A herd-book for the Brava was established in the same year.

The population in 2004 was estimated at 5950 head. In 2014 it was reported to be 3275.

== Characteristics ==
The Brava is variable in colour, but is most often uniformly black. The mucous membranes are dark. The horns are large and forward-pointing; they are creamy grey at the base, and dark at the tips.

== Use and management ==
The Brava is bred principally for the bull-ring. Approximately 10% of the animals raised are found suitable for this purpose; the remainder are butchered for meat.

The meat of the Brava (along with that of the Raço di Biòu and crosses between the two) can – under strict conditions of pasturage and of zone and methods of production – be marketed with the Appellation d'Origine Contrôlée certification of origin as "Taureau de Camargue"; animals that have appeared in the bull-ring are excluded.

The meat may be subject to dark cutting – discolouration caused by stress in the animal before death – which disrupts the normal post-mortem transformation of muscle tissue to meat; this can reduce the market value of the product.

The cattle are commonly managed extensively in the wetlands of the Camargue. They are kept in manades, and herded by mounted gardians.
