= Raço di Biòu =

French breed of cattle

Camargue
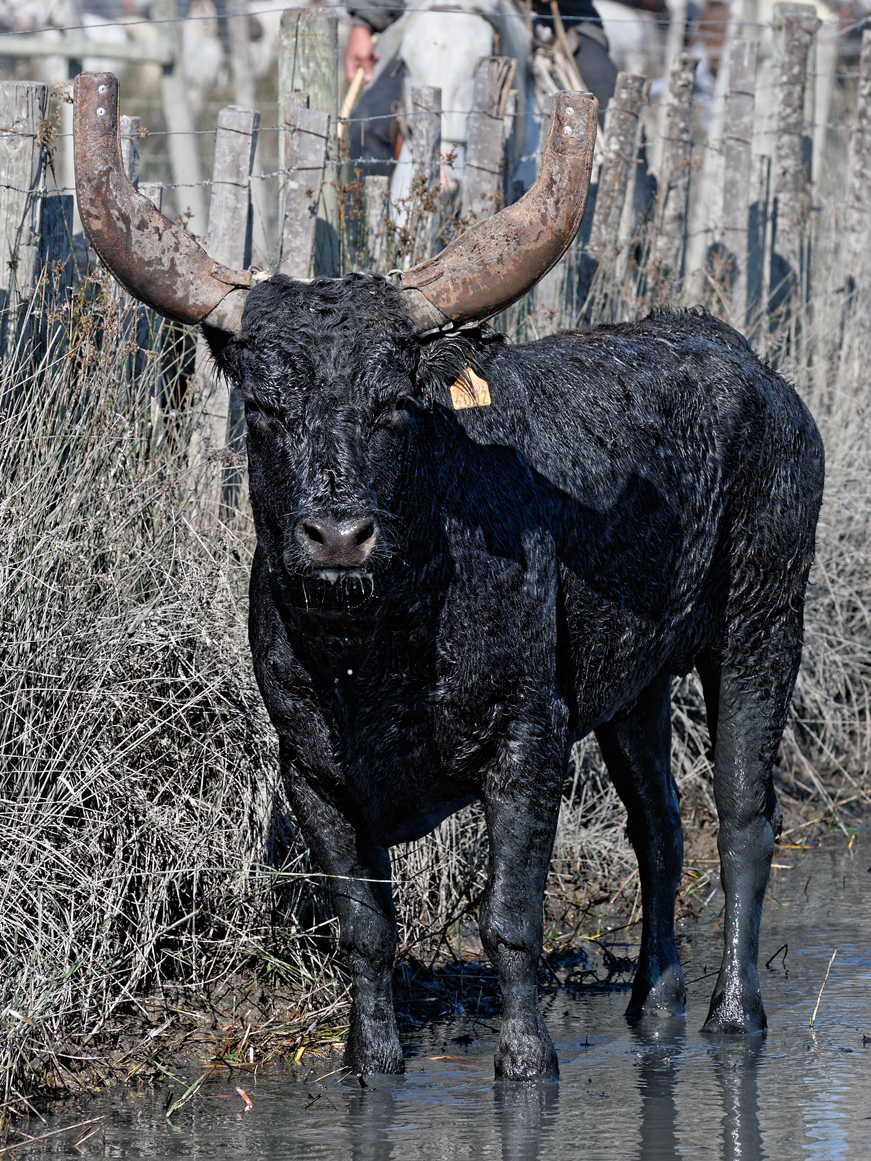
- Young bull

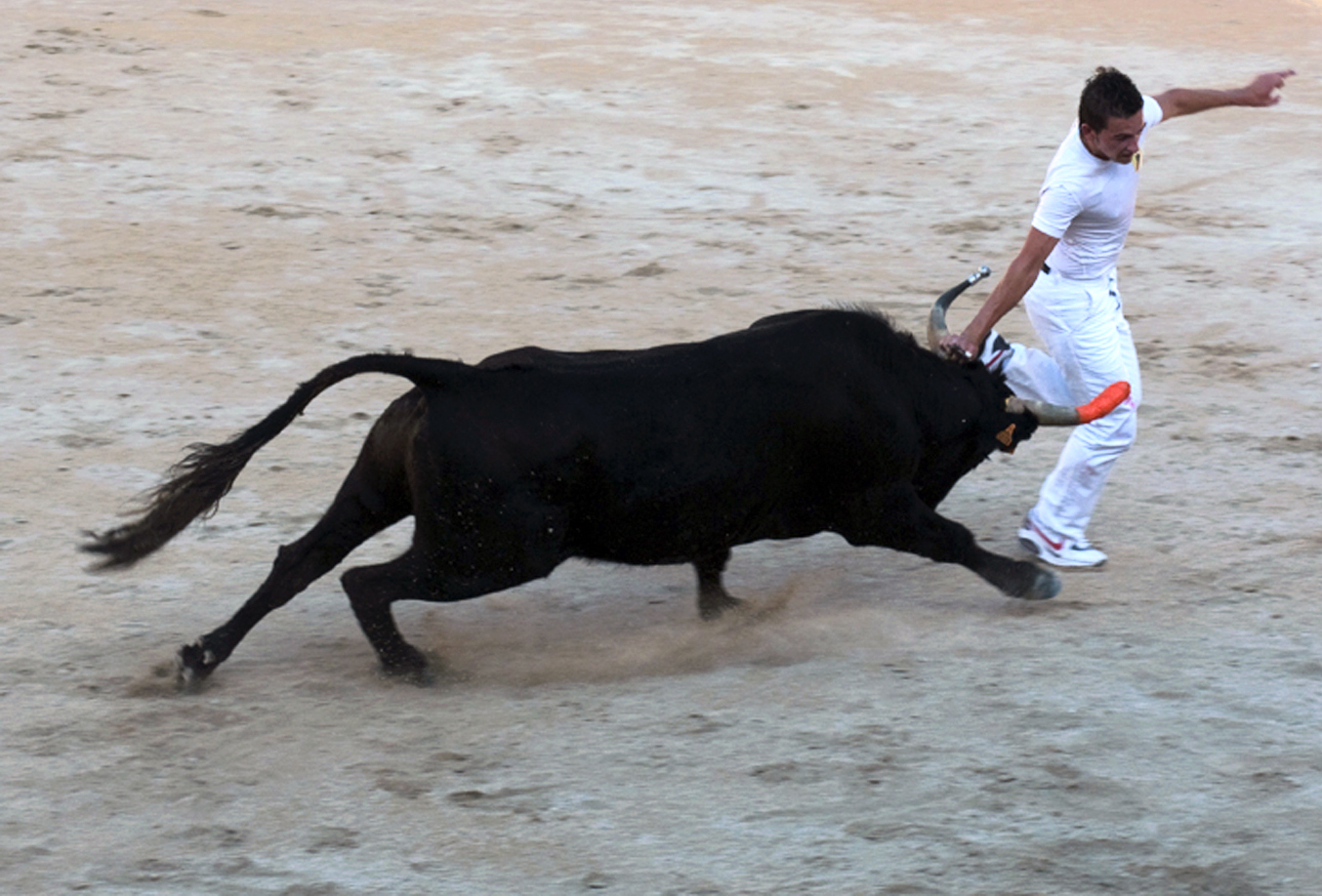
- Bullock and raseteur in the course camarguaise
- Conservation status: FAO (2007): not at risk; DAD-IS (2023): not at risk
- Other names: Camargue; Race Camarguaise
- Country of origin: France
- Distribution: Camargue, Provence-Alpes-Côte d'Azur; Petite Camargue, Occitanie
- Standard: French
- Use: course camarguaise; beef; vegetation management

Traits
- Weight: Male: 400 kg; Female: 250 kg
- Height: Male: 125 cm; Female: 115 cm
- Coat: black
- Horn status: horned in both sexes

Notes
- semi-feral
- Cattle; Bos (primigenius) taurus

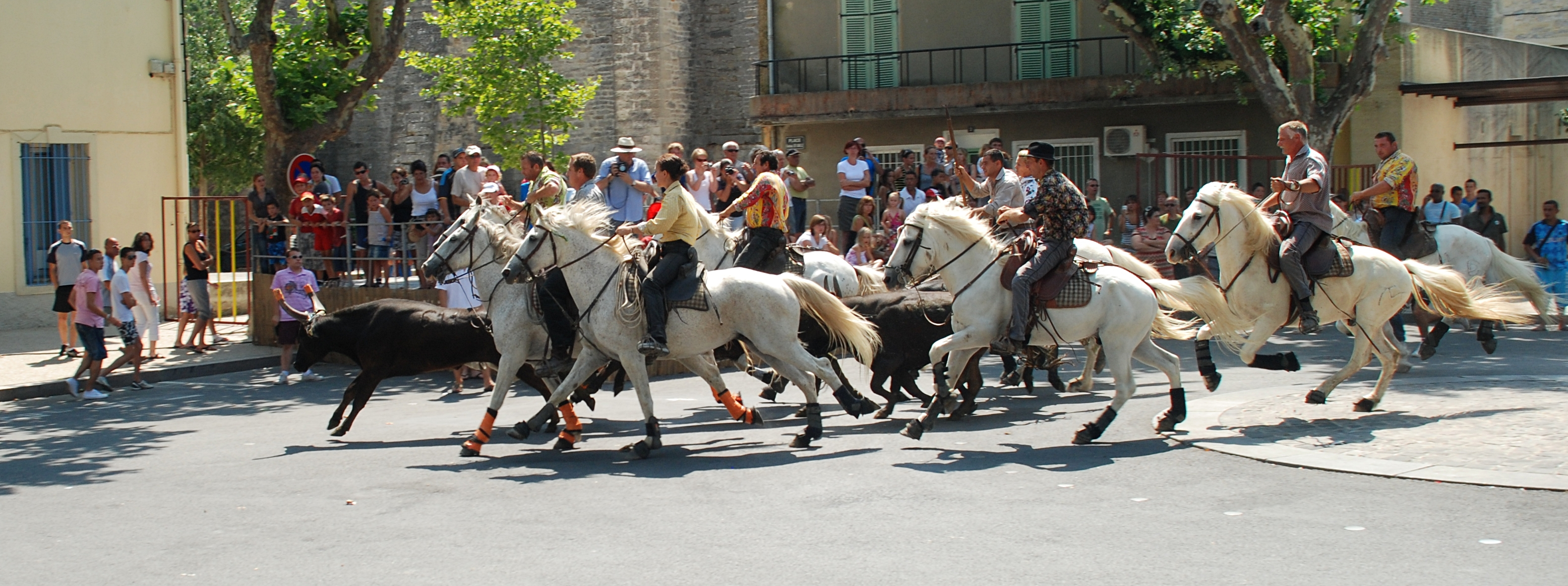
Abrivado at Calvisson

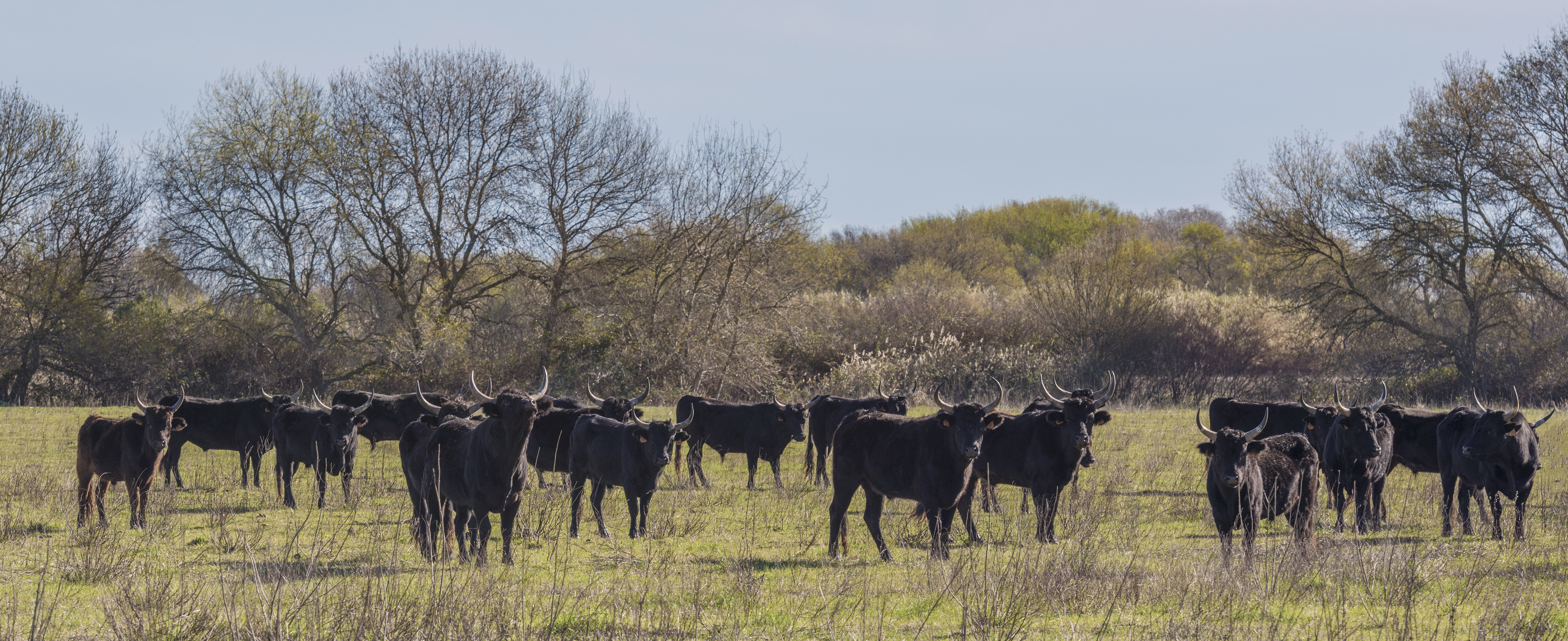
At pasture near Saint-Gilles, in the Gard

The Raço di Biòu is a French breed of domestic cattle native to the Camargue marshlands of the river delta of the Rhône in southern France. It is used for the traditional sport of course camarguaise, a kind of bloodless bull-fight, but not for the corrida, Iberian-style bull-fighting. It is one of two cattle breeds raised in semi-feral conditions in the Camargue; the other is the Brava or Race de Combat, a fighting breed. It was formerly known as the Camargue or Race Camarguaise; since 1996 it has been officially known by its Provençal name.

== History ==
The Raço di Biòu has long been raised in semi-feral conditions in the wetlands of the Camargue, in the département of Bouches-du-Rhône in the region of Provence-Alpes-Côte d'Azur, and of the Petite Camargue, in the département of Gard in the region of Occitanie. It is one of two cattle breeds raised in the area, the other being the Brava or Race de Combat, a fighting breed. Both are associated with the rural and cultural traditions of the Camargue, including the gardians – mounted herders who manage the livestock in manades – and the small white Camargue horses that they ride.

In 1996 beef from the two breeds of the Camargue, or from cross-breeds between them, received Appellation d’Origine Contrôlée status as "Taureau de Camargue". The name of the Camargue breed was changed to Raço di Biòu, and a herd-book was established.

The population in 2004 was estimated at 5950. In 2014 it was reported to be 5332; by 2020 it had risen to over 20000, and the conservation status of the breed was listed as 'not at risk'.

== Characteristics ==
The Raço di Biòu is uniformly black, or occasionally dark brown. The mucous membranes are dark. The horns are large; they are grey at the base, creamy white in the middle, and dark at the tips.

== Use and management ==
The Raço di Biòu is raised principally for the traditional sport of the course camarguaise, a type of bloodless bull-running in which castrated bullocks are used. In the ring, raseteurs must try to remove a cockade from the forehead of the bull. The bullocks are driven on foot to the arena by mounted gardians (the abrivado), and returned to the manade in the same way (the bandido).

The meat of the Raço di Biòu, along with that of the Brava cattle breed and crosses between the two, can – under strict conditions of pasturage and of zone and methods of production – be marketed with the Appellation d'Origine Contrôlée certification of origin as "Taureau de Camargue"; animals that have appeared in the bull-ring are excluded. Approximately 2000 head are sold each year for beef.

The Raço di Biòu is managed extensively in the wetlands of the Camargue. The cattle are kept in manades, and herded by mounted gardians. The cattle contribute to the maintenance of large areas of Camargue wetland, and are also regarded as a tourist attraction.

The administration of the Parc naturel régional de Camargue participates in several aspects of the management of the breed, including registration of births and matings, and organisation of course camarguaises.
