= Camargue (disambiguation) =

Camargue is a coastal region in southern France, between the Mediterranean Sea and the two arms of the Rhône delta.

Camargue may also refer to:

- Camargue cattle
- Camargue horse
- Camargue equitation, an equestrian discipline
- Camargue red rice
- Citroën GS Camargue, a concept car produced in 1972
- Rolls-Royce Camargue, a luxury car produced between 1975 and 1986
- Operation Camargue in the First Indochina War
- Course camarguaise, a style of bullfighting
