= Saintes-Maries-de-la-Mer =

Commune in Provence-Alpes-Côte d'Azur, France

Saintes-Maries-de-la-Mer Lei Santei Marias de la Mar (Occitan)
- Commune
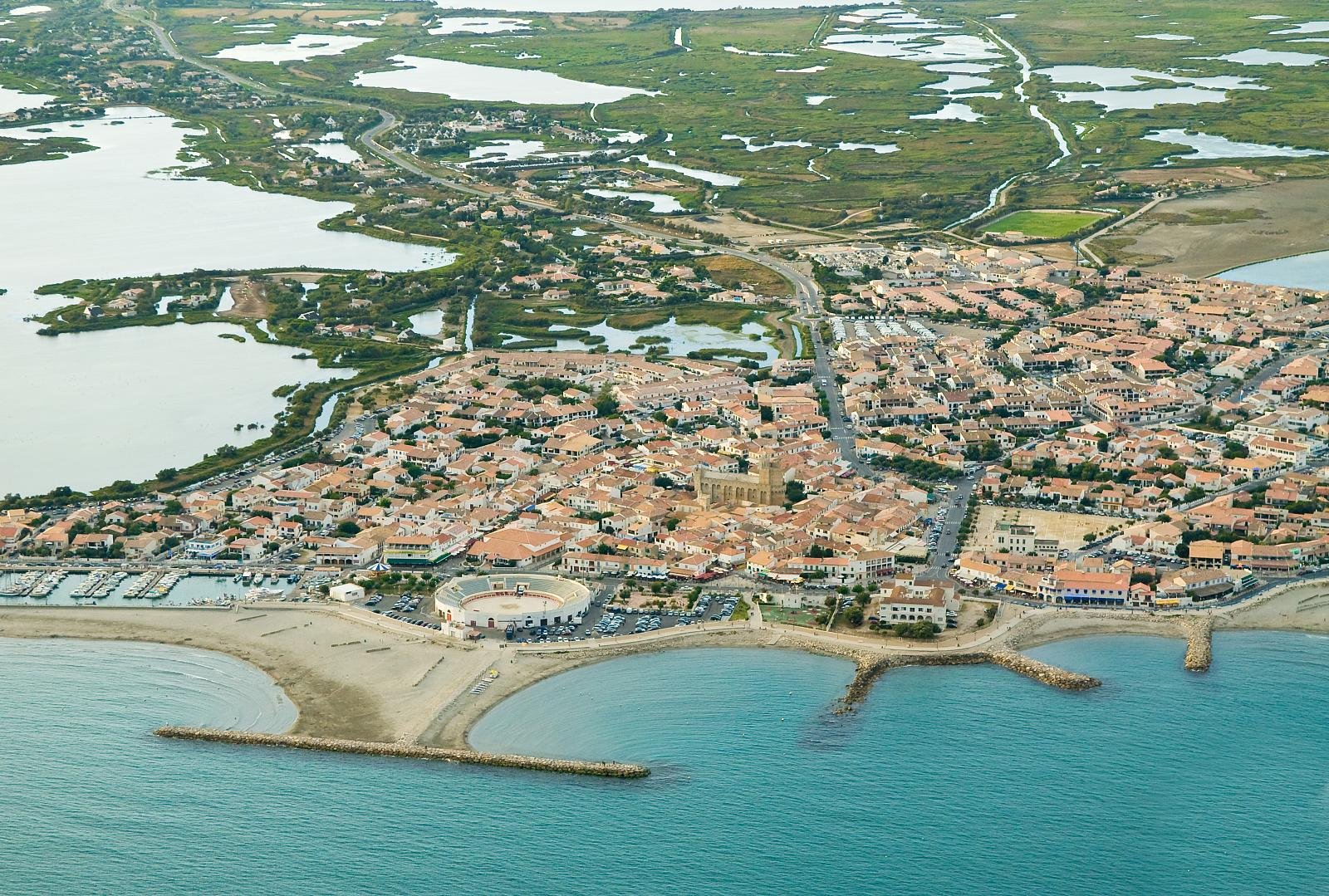
- Aerial view of Saintes-Maries-de-la-Mer by the sea with the arena in the foreground

- Coat of arms
- Location of Saintes-Maries-de-la-Mer
- Location within France Location within Provence-Alpes-Côte d'Azur
- Coordinates: 43°27′10″N 4°25′43″E
- Country: France
- Region: Provence-Alpes-Côte d'Azur
- Department: Bouches-du-Rhône
- Arrondissement: Arles
- Canton: Arles
- Intercommunality: CA Arles-Crau-Camargue-Montagnette

Government
  - Mayor (2026–32): Thibaut Mena
- Area^{1}: 374.61 km^{2} (144.64 sq mi)
- Elevation: 4 m (13 ft)
- Highest elevation: 6 m (20 ft)
- Lowest elevation: 0 m (0 ft)
- Population (2023): 2,433
  - Density: 6.495/km^{2} (16.82/sq mi)
- Demonym: Saintois
- Time zone: UTC+01:00 (CET)
  - Summer (DST): UTC+02:00 (CEST)
- INSEE/Postal code: 13096 /13460
- Website: www.lessaintesmaries.fr
- ^{1} French Land Register data, which excludes lakes, ponds, glaciers > 1 km^{2} (0.386 sq mi or 247 acres) and river estuaries.

Saintes-Maries-de-la-Mer (French pronunciation: [sɛ̃tmaʁi d(ə) la mɛʁ], alternatively with the definite article Les Saintes-Maries-de-la-Mer, lit. "(the) Saint Marys of the Sea", locally Les Saintes, [le sɛ̃t]; Provençal: Lei Santei Marias de la Mar (classical norm) or Li Sànti Marìo de la Mar (Mistralian norm)), is the capital of the Camargue (Provençal: Camarga) natural region in Southern France. It lies on the Mediterranean Sea.

Administratively, it is a commune in the Bouches-du-Rhône department, on the departmental border with Gard. It covers the second-largest area of all communes in metropolitan France, smaller only than that of neighbouring Arles.

== Geography ==
The town is situated in the Rhône river delta, about 1 km east of the mouth of the Petit Rhône distributary. The commune comprises alluvial land and marshland, and includes the Étang de Vaccarès, a large lagoon, where a nature reserve protects species including flamingo and egrets. The main industry is tourism. Agricultural produce includes fruit and grain, and rice which has been grown since the years after World War II. Ranchers have raised horses and cattle unique to the Camargue; some of the bulls are used for Spanish-style bull-fighting and for the bloodless course camarguaise. There is bus service to Arles, 38 km away.

== History ==
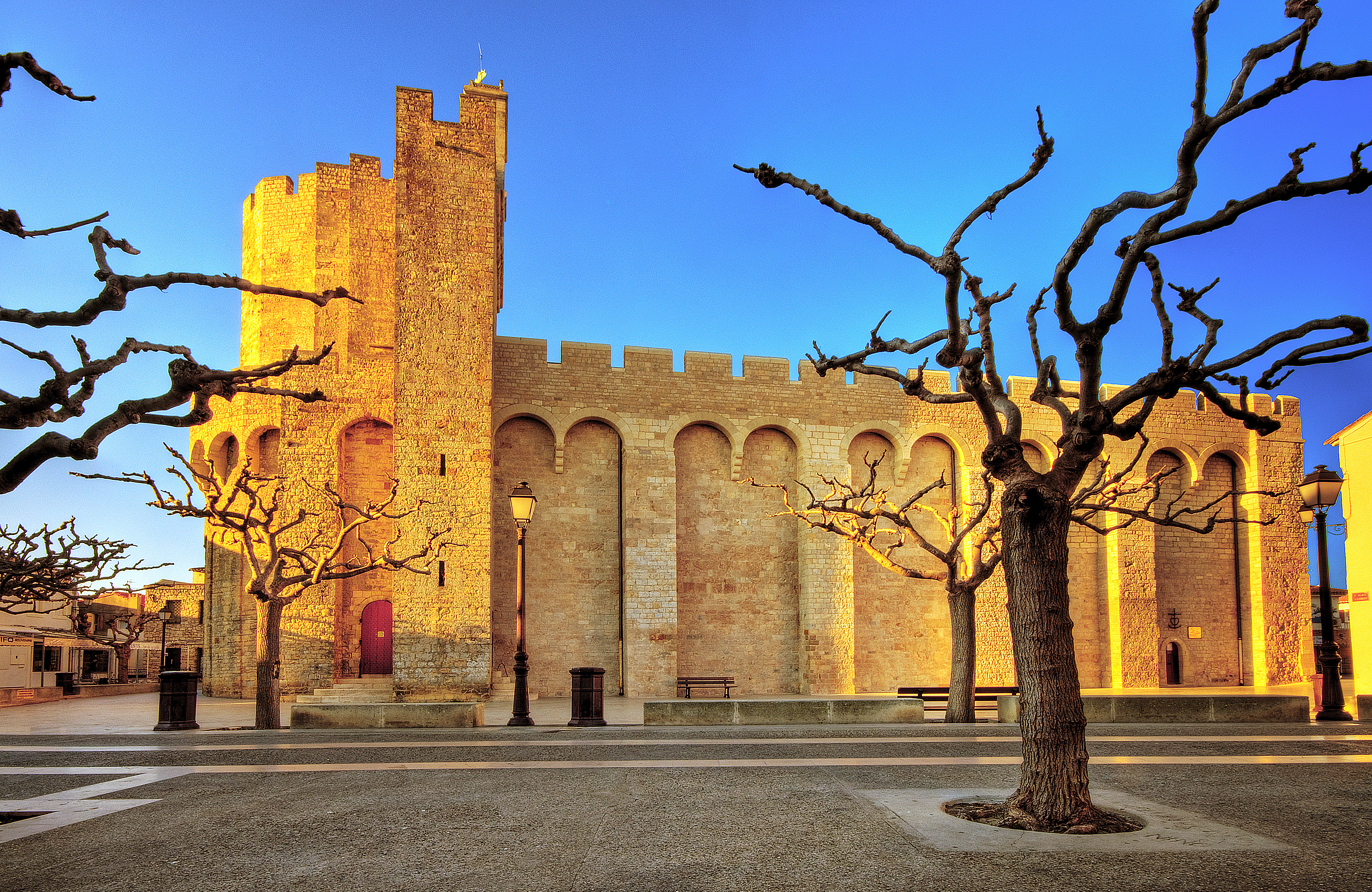
Fortified church of Saintes-Maries-de-la-Mer

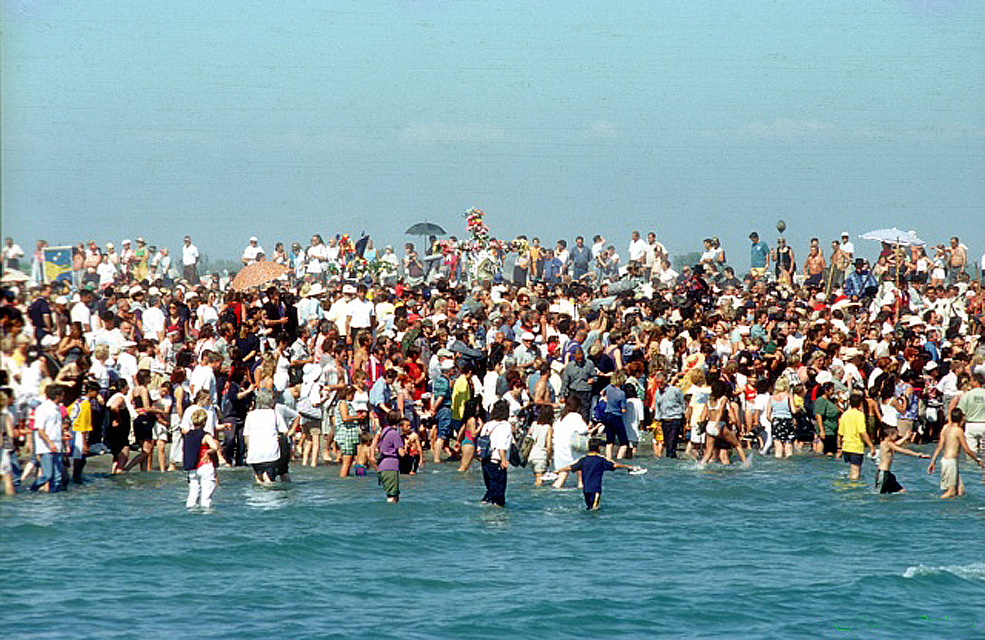
Ritual bath during the Romani pilgrimage of Saintes-Maries-de-la-Mer

The village was noted as Ra in the 4th century AD by the Roman geographer Rufus Festus Avienus. In the 6th century, the archbishopric of Arles was active and created a monastery or church in the town, named St Mary, a favorite of the fishermen. The village became known as Notre-Dame-de-Ratis (Our Lady of the Boat—Râ being used in ratis, or boat) in reference to the three Marys arriving by boat. (Droit, 1963, 19). The name was later changed to Notre-Dame-de-la-Mer (Our Lady of the Sea, a synonym for the Virgin Mary).

The current Church of the Saintes Maries de la Mer was built from the 9th to the 12th century, as a fortress and a refuge. It can be seen from 10 km away. It has a fresh water well inside, for when the villagers had to take shelter from raiders. In the 9th century, the town suffered raids from the Mediterranean Sea by the Vikings and later from the Saracens. In the 15th century, someone discovered the relics of Mary of Clopas and Mary Salome, who were said to have arrived there by sea (together with Mary Magdalene). The 500th anniversary of this event was celebrated in the 20th century by Pope John XXIII.

In 1720, the town was spared by the plague. During the anti-clerical fervor of the French Revolution, the church was partially destroyed and the stones recycled.

In 1838, the town was renamed Saintes-Maries-de-la-Mer, after the three Maries of its Catholic and local history. Shortly afterward, the pilgrimage (see below) was instituted. A narrow-gauge railway line to Arles operated from 1892 until 1953.

In 1888, Van Gogh made several paintings of the seascape and the town. In the early 20th century, the town was a literary and artistic center, with visits inter alios from such figures as American writer Ernest Hemingway and Spanish painter Picasso. The vicinity was used as a setting for various films.

Since the second half of the 20th century, the population has increased. Retired people and holiday accommodation largely supplanted the fishermen and farmers, with a corresponding political shift to the right in elections.

== Religion ==
Saintes-Maries-de-la-Mer, an ancient town in the marshes of the Camargue, where the Rhône meets the Mediterranean Sea, is named after The Three Marys—in French, Marie Madeleine, Marie Salomé and Marie de Cléophas—a group of three women closely linked to Jesus, as according to the gospels they came to his sepulchre three days after the Crucifixion and were the first witnesses of his Resurrection. The designation "de-la-Mer" (of the sea) derives from a medieval tradition that after Jesus' Resurrection, The Three Marys escaped the Christian persecution in Judaea and travelled across the sea by boat, living in the Camargue the rest of their lives and helping to bring Christianity to France. Annual pilgrimages are held in honour of the Marys, and of St Sara, which attract thousands of Catholics, Gypsies, and tourists.

The three saints Mary Magdalene, Mary Salome and Mary of Clopas are believed to be the women who were the first witnesses to the empty tomb at the resurrection of Jesus. After the Crucifixion of Jesus, the Marys were said to set sail from Alexandria, Egypt, with their uncle Joseph of Arimathea. According to a longstanding French legend, they either sailed to or were cast adrift—arriving off the coast of what is now France, at "a sort of fortress named Oppidum-Râ". The location became known as "Our Lady of the Boat" (French: Nôtre-Dame-de-Ratis)—Râ being used in ratis, or boat. The name was later changed to Notre-Dame-de-la-Mer. In 1838, it was changed to Les Saintes-Maries-de-la-Mer.

Today, aside from being a working class summer beach destination with a Romanesque fortress-church, Church of the Saintes Maries de la Mer, Saintes-Maries-de-la-Mer is known in France for the celebrations it holds for each Mary's feast, in May and October. The feast days in May draw large numbers of Roma Catholics and others from France and beyond—typically 25,000–40,000 people all together—to the town for a week. The high points at that feast include a ritual when a painted reliquary chest, said to contain the bones of the Saintes Maries, is ceremoniously lowered from its high perch to the altar for veneration, and when the crypt is left open so that the statue of another figure, the Roma's own Saint Sarah, can be honored. On successive days, Romas and a large crowd process statues of Sara and the Saintes Maries from the church to the beach, carrying them right into the sea.

The dark-skinned Saint Sara of the Roma pilgrimage is said to have possibly been the Egyptian servant of the three Marys. In another version, Sara was a local woman who welcomed the three Marys on their arrival. A statue of Sarah is in the crypt of the church, which also encloses a 4th-century BC taurobolic altar once dedicated to the cult of the Indo-Iranian god Mithras, although a likely Celtic origin is claimed.

== Population ==
Historical population

Year	Pop.	±% p.a.
1793	1,000	—
1800	644	−6.09%
1806	783	+3.31%
1821	530	−2.57%
1831	543	+0.24%
1836	837	+9.04%
1841	910	+1.69%
1846	669	−5.97%
1851	1,013	+8.65%
1856	1,083	+1.35%
1861	1,000	−1.58%
1866	1,006	+0.12%
1872	951	−0.93%
1876	926	−0.66%
1881	918	−0.17%
1886	1,159	+4.77%
1891	1,025	−2.43%
1896	1,446	+7.12%
1901	1,531	+1.15%

Year	Pop.	±% p.a.
1906	1,439	−1.23%
1911	1,413	−0.36%
1921	1,352	−0.44%
1926	1,567	+3.00%
1931	1,723	+1.92%
1936	1,564	−1.92%
1946	1,687	+0.76%
1954	2,207	+3.42%
1962	2,179	−0.16%
1968	2,244	+0.49%
1975	2,120	−0.81%
1982	2,045	−0.51%
1990	2,232	+1.10%
1999	2,478	+1.17%
2007	2,317	−0.84%
2012	2,495	+1.49%
2017	2,330	−1.36%
2023	2,433	+0.72%

Source: EHESS and INSEE (1968–2023)

== Sport ==
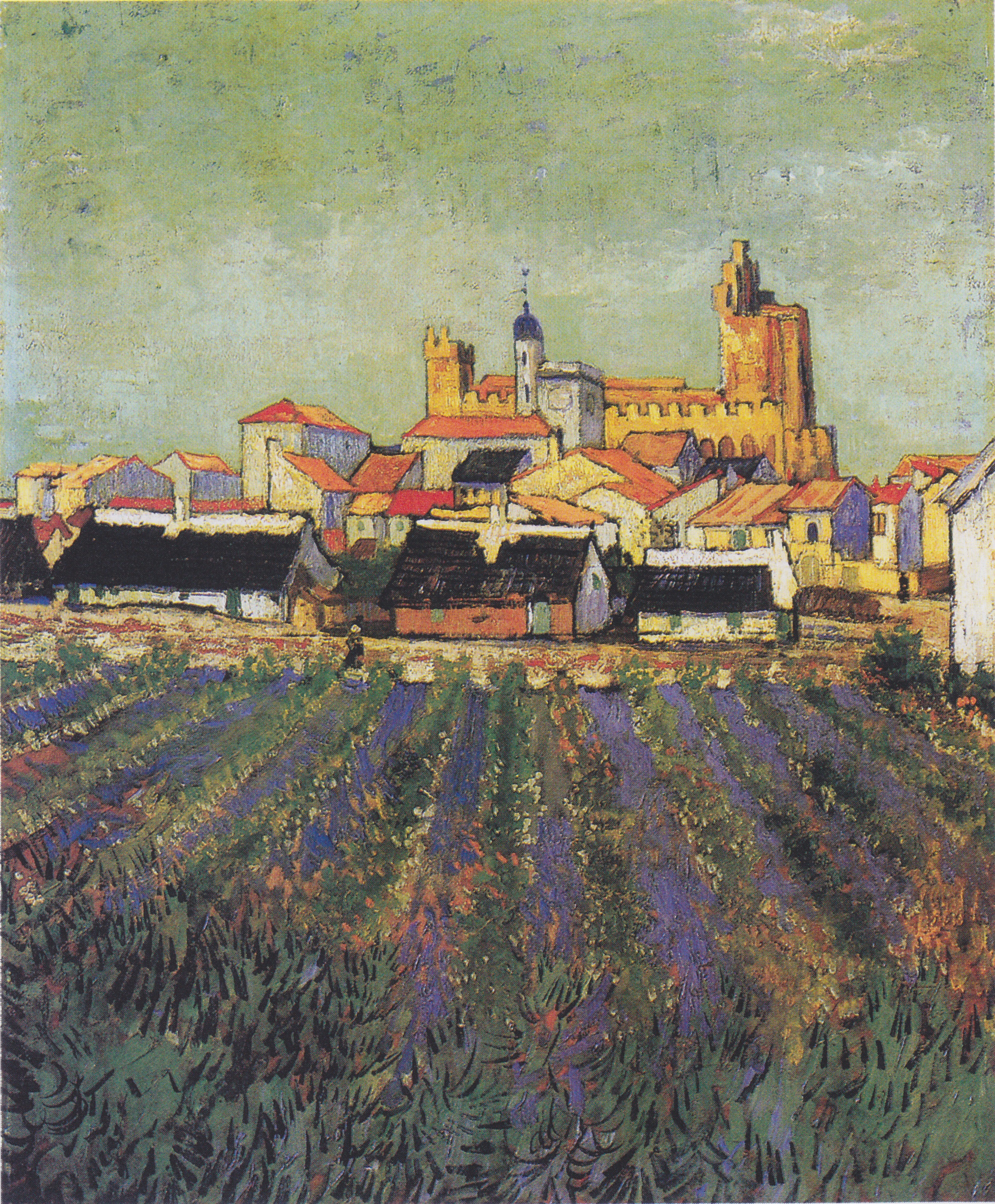
View of Saintes-Maries by Vincent van Gogh, 1888, Kröller-Müller Museum, Otterlo, Netherlands (F416)

- Arènes des Saintes Maries de la Mer is a prominent bullfighting ring, staging festivals throughout the summer.
- The windsurfing Canal (Canal de Vitesse) where 8 Outright World Sailing Speed Records were set between 1988 and 2009 is on the outskirts of the town. The first by British speed windsurfer Erik Beale 40.48 knots and last by French windsurfing legend Antoine Albeau at 49.09 in 2009.

== Notable figures ==
- Vincent van Gogh painted several paintings here, including Street in Saintes-Maries in 1888.
- Hermann-Paul died here in 1940, two days before the French capitulation to Germany in the Battle of France.
- Tori Amos wrote a song, "Marys of the Sea", inspired by Saintes-Maries-de-la-Mer, most notably Mary Magdalene.
- Mick Softley wrote a song called "Just Flew In On A Jet Plane", featured on his Sunrise/Streetsinger album, in which he refers to flying "from Montpelier, from the festival of gypsies, at Les Saintes-Maries-de-la-Mer, and in a church in the village, 1000 candles glow, for Magdalene of the sea, from 2000 years ago".
- Bob Dylan said in 1978 that he composed the song "One More Cup of Coffee", included on his album Desire while visiting the Roma festival in 1975 on his 34th birthday.
- Czon the Swedish artist did a portrait of Sara La Kali here 2018.
- CocoRosie's Sierra and Bianca Casady have created several albums at their mother's farm in Saintes-Maries-de-la-Mer.
- Manoush

== See also ==
- Communes of the Bouches-du-Rhône department
- Bac du Sauvage
- Myrrhbearers
