= Campargue =

Campargue is a French surname. Notable people with the surname include:

- Benoît Campargue (born 1965), French judoka
- Paul Campargue (1903–1969), French journalist and politician

== See also ==
- Camargue (disambiguation)
