= Camargue =

French region in the Rhône river delta

Coordinates: 43°32′N 04°30′E

Designations

Ramsar Wetland
- Official name: Camargue
- Designated: 1 December 1986
- Reference no.: 346

Ramsar Wetland
- Official name: La Petite Camargue
- Designated: 8 January 1996
- Reference no.: 786

The Camargue (/kæˈmɑːrɡ/, also UK: /kəˈ-/, US: /kɑːˈ-/, French: [kamaʁɡ]; Provençal: Camarga) is a coastal region in southern France located south of the city of Arles, between the Mediterranean Sea and the two arms of the Rhône river delta. The eastern arm is called the Grand Rhône; the western is the Petit Rhône.

Administratively, it lies within the department of Bouches-du-Rhône (‘Mouths of the Rhône’); it spans portions of the communes of Arles, Saintes-Maries-de-la-Mer and Port-Saint-Louis-du-Rhône. A further expanse of marshy plain, known as the "Petite Camargue" (Little Camargue; Occitan: Pichon Camarga), just to the west of the "Petit Rhône", lies within the department of Gard.

The Camargue was designated a Ramsar site as a "Wetland of International Importance" on 1 December 1986. The Petite Camargue received this designation on 8 January 1996.

== Geography ==
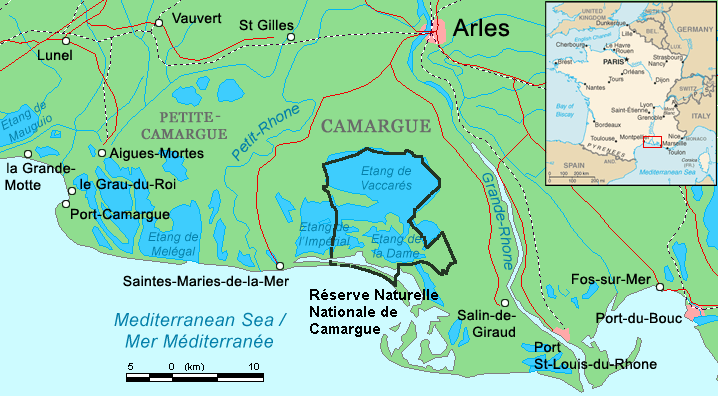
Map of the Camargue

With an area of over 930 km^{2} (360 sq mi), the Camargue is one of western Europe's largest river deltas. It is a vast plain comprising large brine lagoons or étangs, cut off from the sea by sandbars and encircled by reed-covered marshes. These are in turn surrounded by a large cultivated area.

Approximately a third of the Camargue is either lakes or marshland. The central area around the shoreline of the Étang de Vaccarès has been protected as a regional park since 1927, in recognition of its great importance as a haven for wild birds. In 2008, it was incorporated into the larger Parc naturel régional de Camargue.

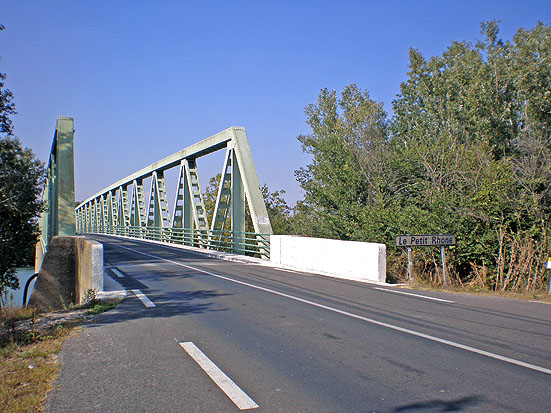
Former Sylvéréal bridge (2007) upon le petit Rhône.

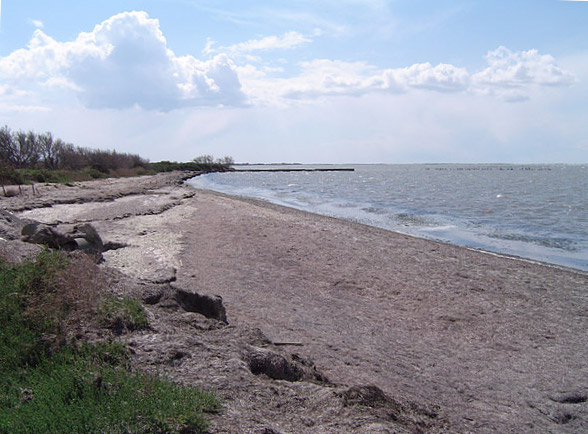
Shoreline of the Étang de Vaccarès.

== Flora and fauna ==
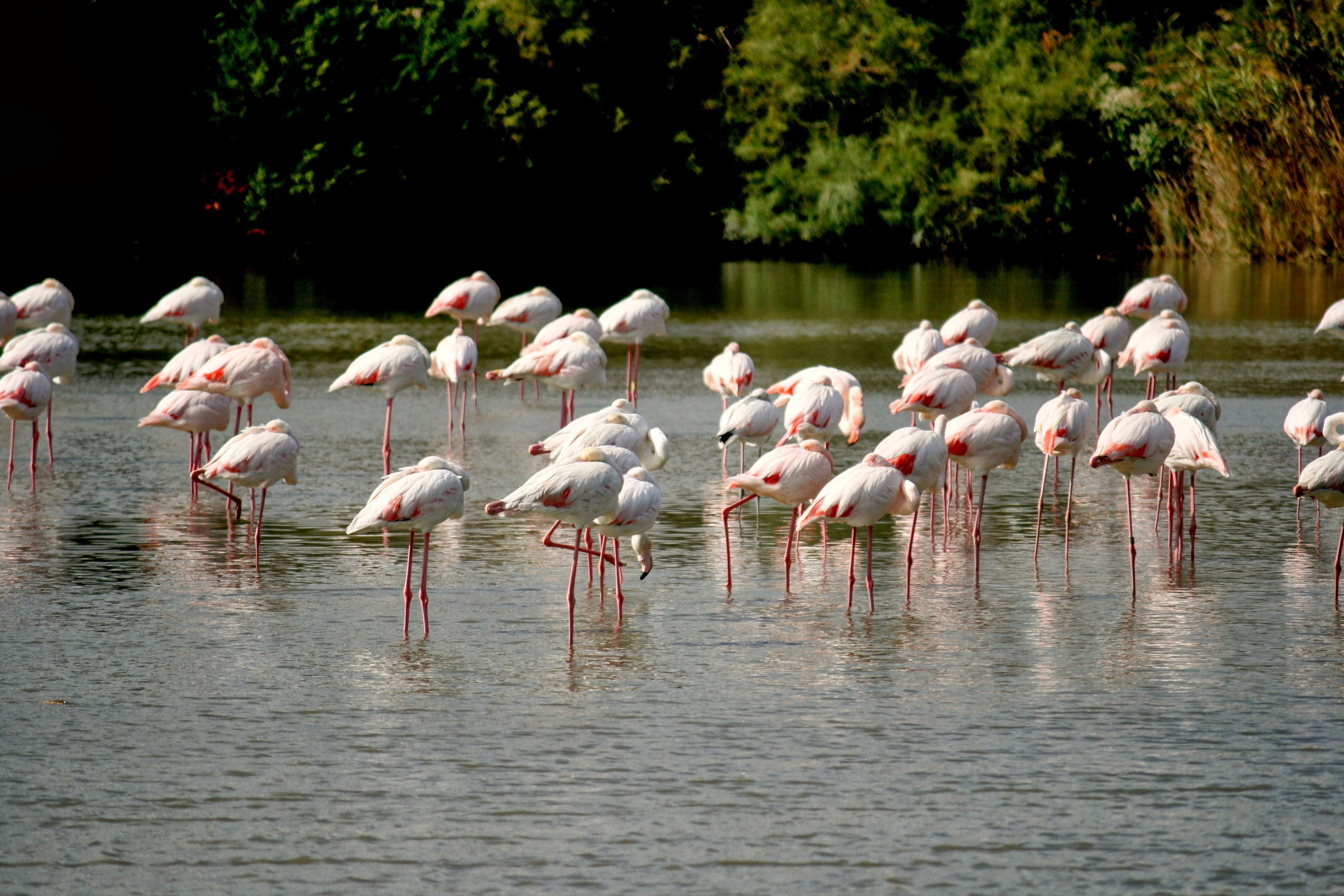
Flamingos in the Camargue

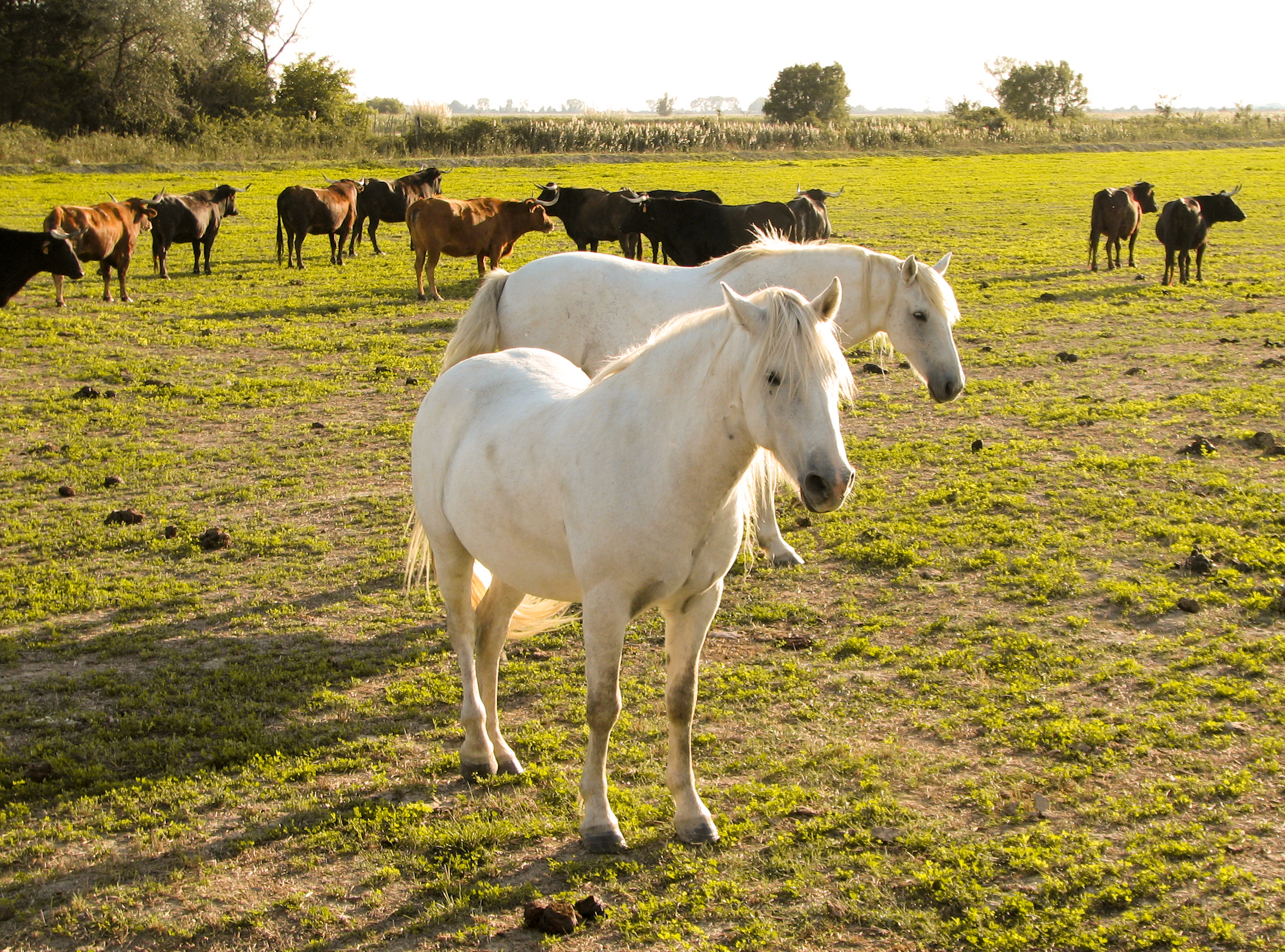
Horses and cattle in the Camargue

The Camargue is home to more than 400 species of birds and has been identified as an Important Bird Area (IBA) by BirdLife International. Its brine ponds provide one of the few European habitats for the greater flamingo. The marshes are also a prime habitat for many species of insects. Camargue horses (Camarguais) roam the extensive marshlands, along with Camargue cattle.

The native flora of the Camargue have adapted to the saline conditions. Sea lavender and glasswort flourish, along with tamarisks and reeds.

== Regional park ==
Officially established as a regional park and nature reserve in 1970, the Parc naturel régional de Camargue covers 820 km^{2} (320 sq mi). This territory is some of the most natural and most protected in all of Europe. A roadside museum provides background on flora, fauna, as well as the history of the area.

== Human influence ==
Humans have lived in the Camargue for millennia, greatly affecting it with drainage schemes, dykes, rice paddies and salt pans. Much of the outer Camargue has been drained for agricultural purposes.

The Camargue has an eponymous horse breed, the white Camarguais. Camargue horses are ridden by the gardians (cowboys), who rear the region's cattle for fighting bulls for regional use and for export to Spain, as well as sheep. Many of these animals are raised in semi-feral conditions, allowed to roam through the Camargue within a manade, or free-running herd. They are periodically rounded up for culling, medical treatment, or other events.

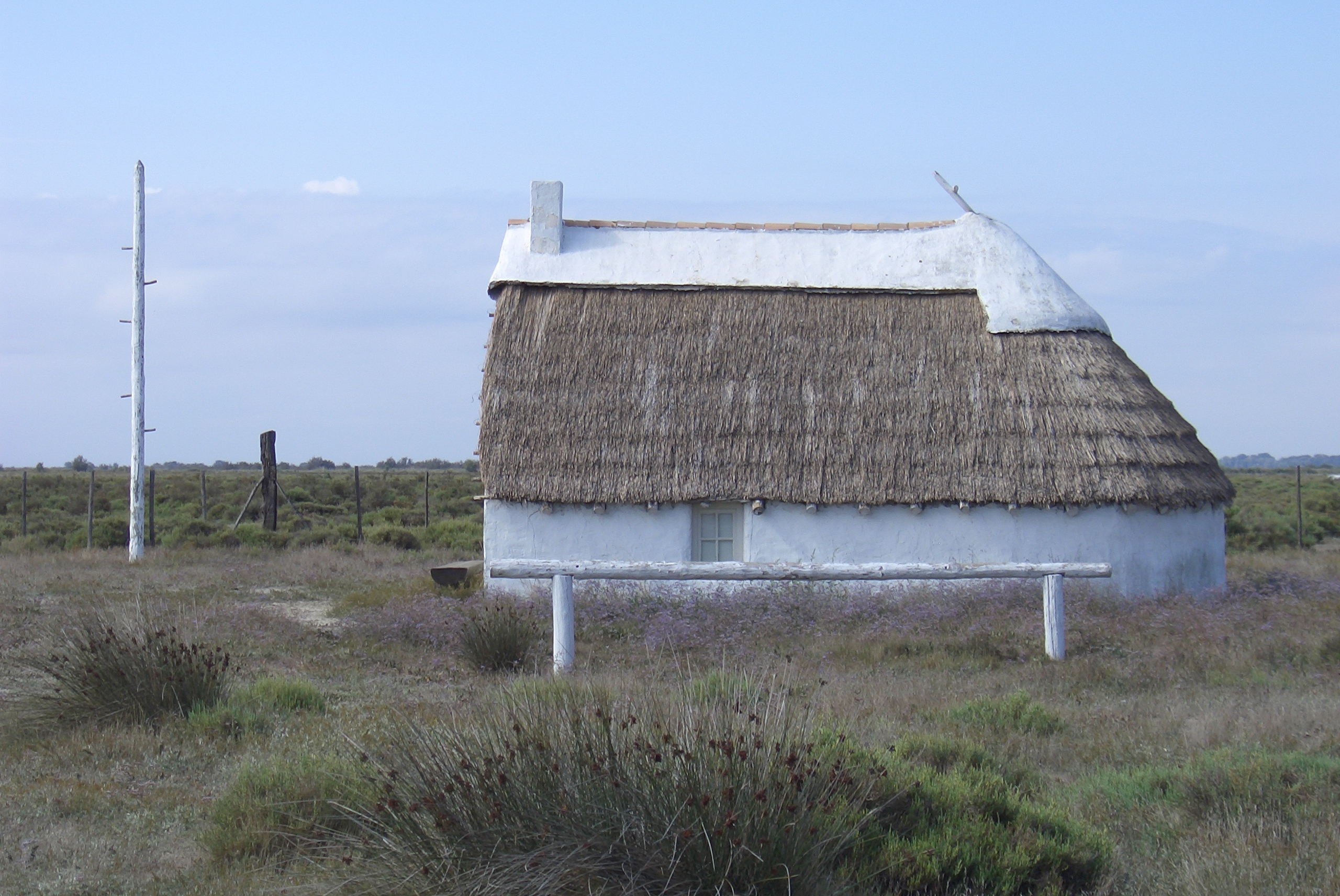
A 20th-century "gardian" home. The pole is used to climb up and check the animals

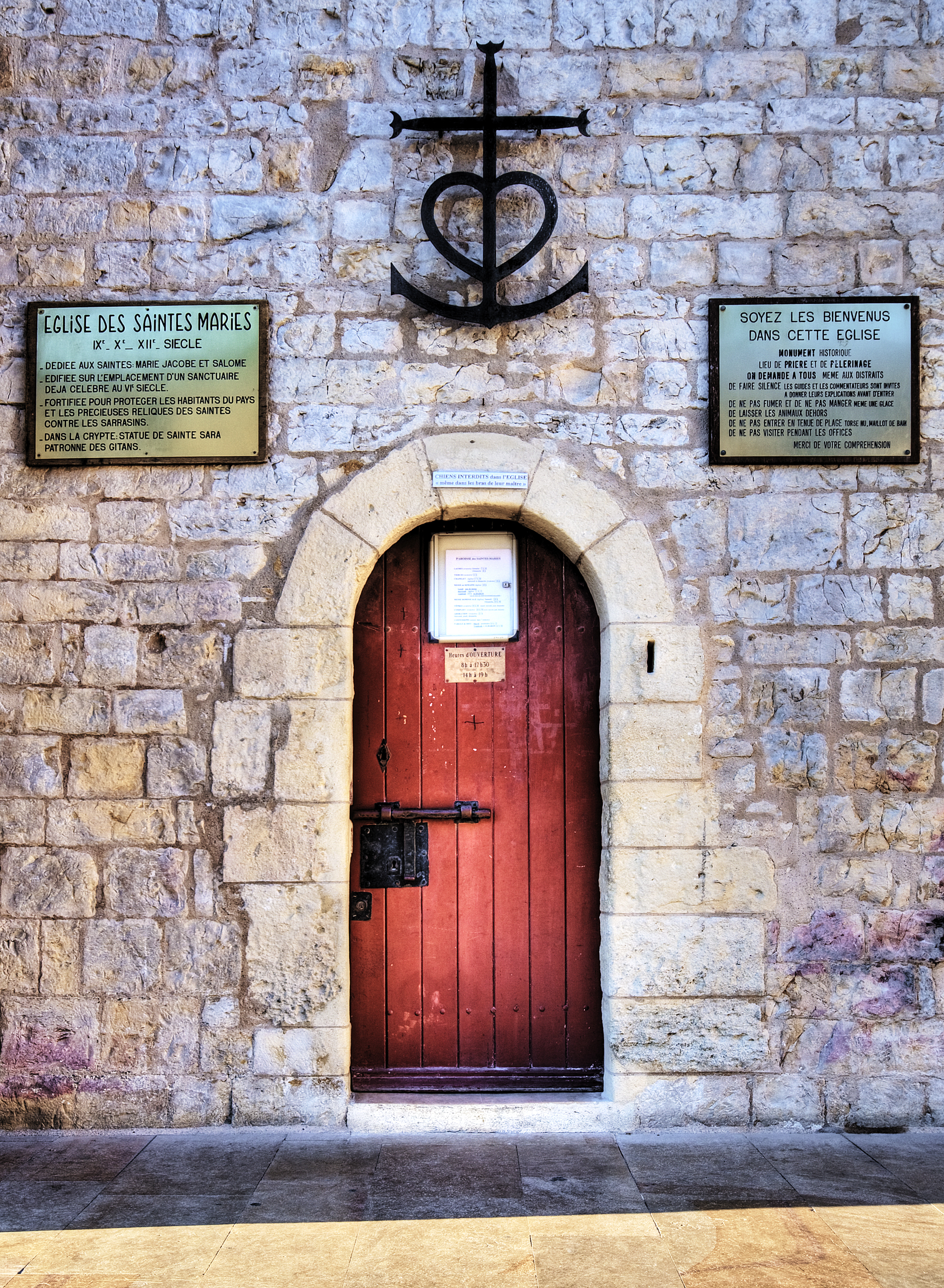
The Cross of Camargue on the Church of the Saintes Maries de la Mer

Few towns of any size have developed in the Camargue. Arles has been called its "capital", located at the extreme north of the delta where the Rhône forks into its two principal branches. The only other towns of note are along the seafront or near it: Saintes-Maries-de-la-Mer, which has also been dubbed its "capital", about 45 km (28 mi) to the southwest. The medieval fortress-town of Aigues-Mortes is located on the far western edge, in the Petite Camargue. Saintes-Maries-de-la-Mer is the destination of the annual Romani pilgrimage for the veneration of Saint Sarah.

The Camargue was exploited in the Middle Ages by Cistercian and Benedictine monks. In the 16th–17th centuries, big estates, known locally as mas, were founded by rich landlords from Arles. At the end of the 18th century, they had the Rhône diked to protect the town and their properties from flooding. In 1858, the building of the digue à la mer (dyke to the sea) achieved temporary protection of the delta from erosion, but it is a changing landform, always affected by waters and weather.

The north of the Camargue is agricultural land. The main crops are cereals, grapes and rice. Near the seashore, prehistoric man started extracting salt, a practice that continues today. Salt was a source of wealth for the Cistercian "salt abbeys" of Ulmet, Franquevaux and Psalmody in the Middle Ages. Industrial salt collection started in the 19th century, and big chemical companies such as Pechiney and Solvay founded the "mining" city of Salin-de-Giraud.

The boundaries of the Camargue are constantly altered by the Rhône as it transports huge quantities of mud downstream – as much as 20 million m^{3} annually. Some of the étangs are the remnants of old arms and legs of the river. The general trend is for the coastline to move outwards as new earth is deposited in the delta at the river's mouth. Aigues-Mortes, originally built as a port on the coast, is now some 5 km (3.1 mi) inland. The pace of change has been modified in recent years by man-made barriers, such as dams on the Rhône and sea dykes, but flooding remains a problem across the region.

== See also ==
- Bac du Sauvage
- Camargue cattle
- Camargue equitation
- Camargue horse
- Camargue red rice
- Folco de Baroncelli-Javon
- Gardian
- Manade
