= Camargue horse =

Breed of horse

Camargue

- Gardians in parade, 2023
- Conservation status: FAO (2007): not at risk; DAD-IS (2023): not at risk
- Other names: Camarguais; Cheval de Camargue
- Country of origin: France
- Standard: Haras Nationaux

Traits
- Weight: 350 to 500 kg (770 to 1100 lb)
- Height: 135–150 cm (13.1–14.3 h)
- Colour: grey

The Camargue or French: Cheval de Camargue, Occitan: Caval de Camarga or Camargués, is a traditional French breed of working horse indigenous to the Camargue wetlands in the département of Bouches-du-Rhône, in southern France. Its origins are unknown.

The horses are traditionally managed extensively, living in small semi-feral herds known as manades in the wetlands of the delta of the Rhône. The Camargue is the traditional mount of the gardians, the Camargue riders who herd the black Raço di Biòu bulls used for courses camarguaises in the region. The gardians are also responsible for management of the horses, which are rounded up annually for health inspections, branding and gelding of unsuitable stock.

== History ==
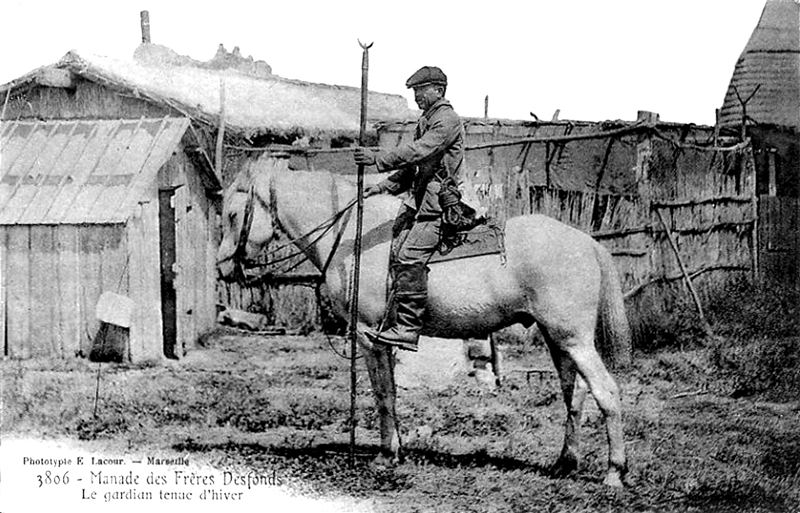
A gardian in the early twentieth century

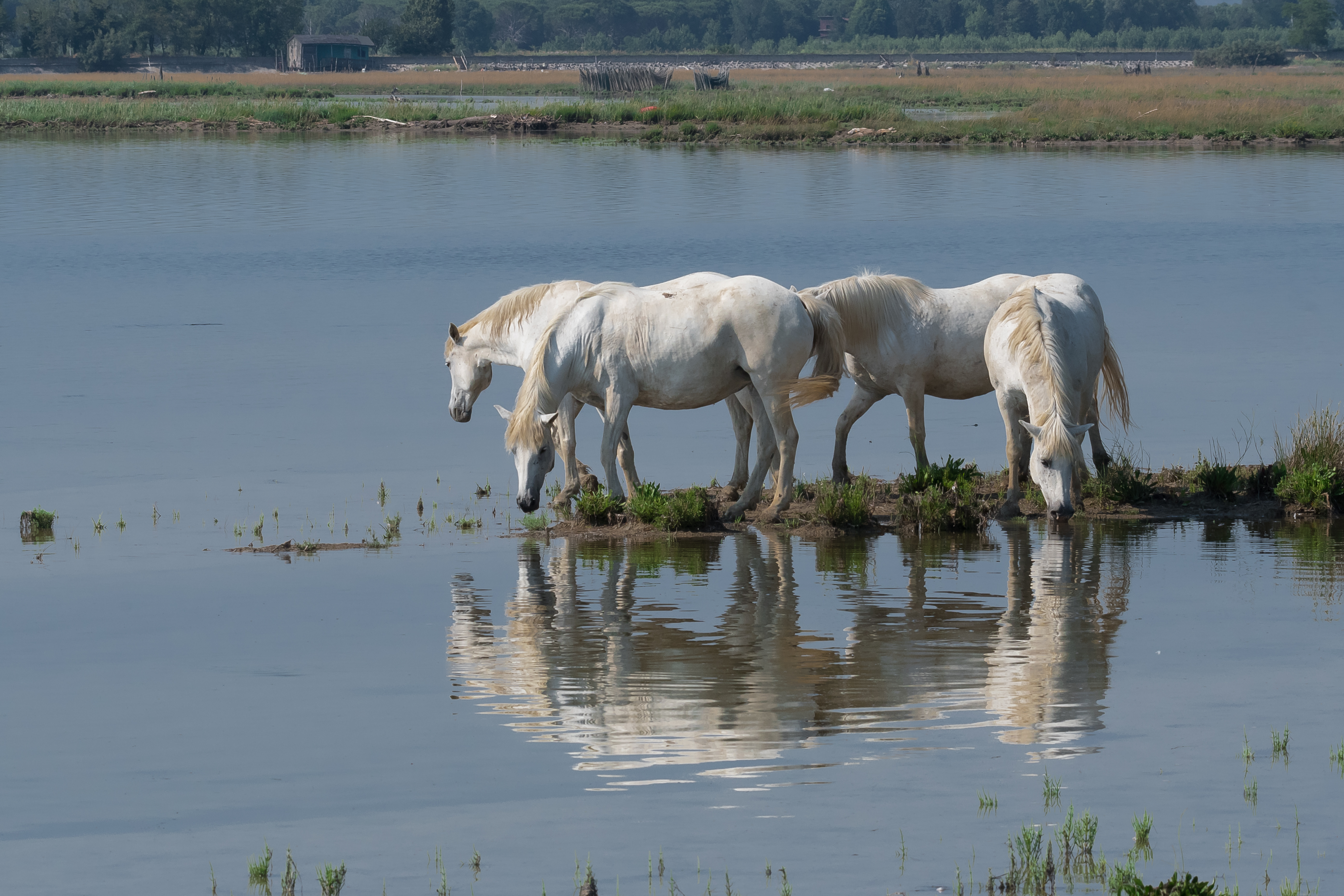
In full white stage of greying

A breed society, the Association des Eleveurs de Chevaux de Race Camargue, was established in 1964. In 1978 the breed was formally recognised by the Ministère de l'Agriculture and a stud-book was started. To be eligible for full registration a foal must be foaled and identified in a manade within the berceau ('cradle') – a defined area consisting of forty-five communes in the départements of Bouches-du-Rhône, Gard and Hérault – and must be branded before it is weaned. In 2004 two appendices were created in the stud-book: hors manade for foals born inside the defined region but not in a manade; and hors berceau for those born outside the defined region.

The conservation status of the Camargue was listed in DAD-IS in 2023 as 'not at risk', based on a reported population in 2018 in France of just over 14500 head, including more than 7100 brood-mares and almost 1800 stallions. These figures are widely at variance with those provided by the Haras Nationaux, which for 2018 reported 200 active stallions and 929 brood-mares mounted.

The population is concentrated in southern France. Of just over 600 foals born and registered in 2017, almost 50% were in Occitanie and over 40% in Provence–Alpes–Côte d'Azur; of the remaining 7%, about half were born in Auvergne-Rhône-Alpes. Small numbers are also present in Germany, and in the United Kingdom. The Camargue was introduced in the 1970s to the Po delta in Italy, where under the name 'Cavallo del Delta' it is treated as an indigenous breed; in 2011 the registered population numbered 163.

== Characteristics ==
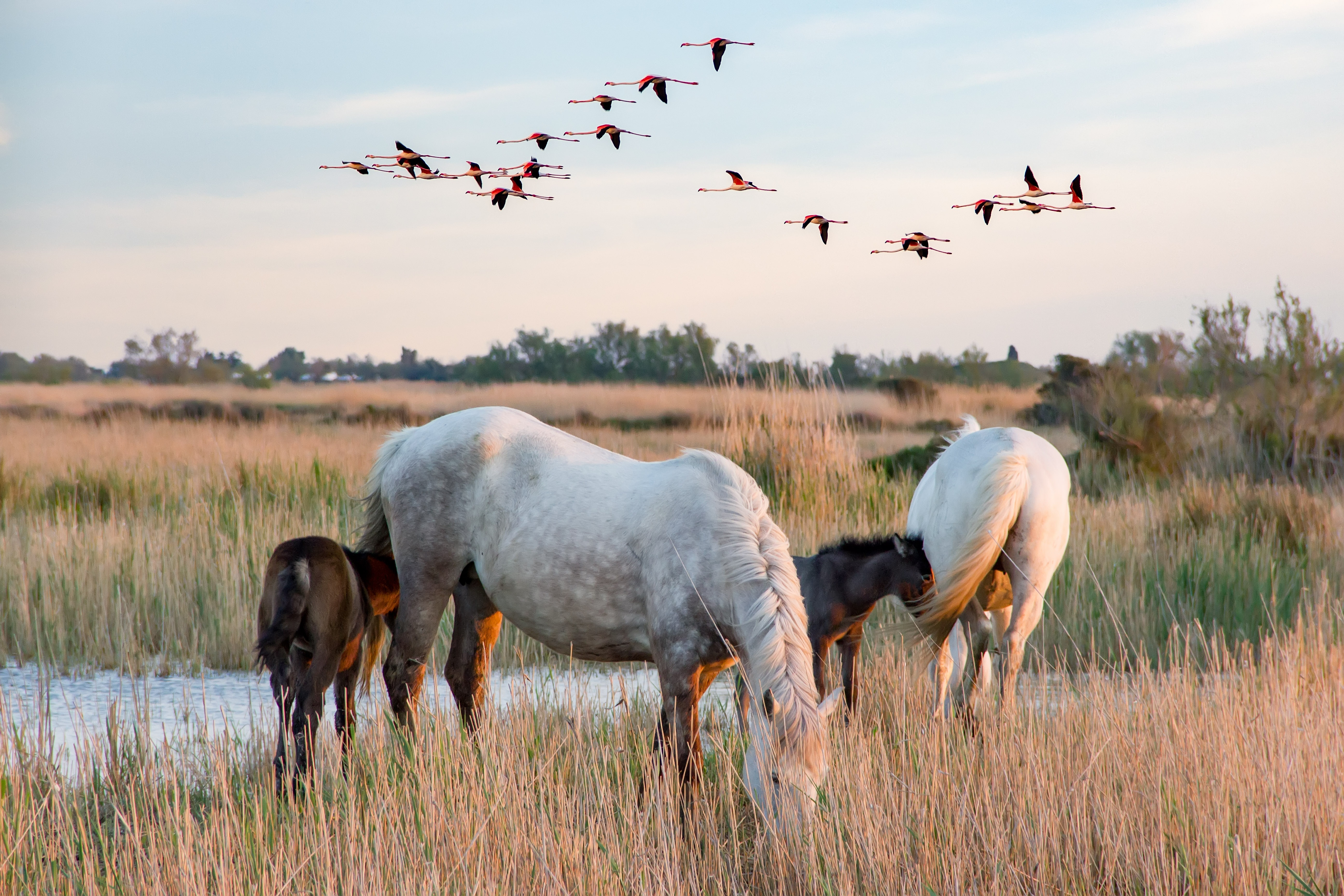
Mares and foals

The Camargue is of southern Iberian phenotype, with a slightly convex or straight facial profile. The horses are always grey – white with black skin. As in all grey horses, foals are born dark and gradually lighten in the first years of life.

It is a small horse: heights at the withers usually fall in the range 135 to 150 cm, with body weights of between 350 and 500 kg.

=== Terminology ===
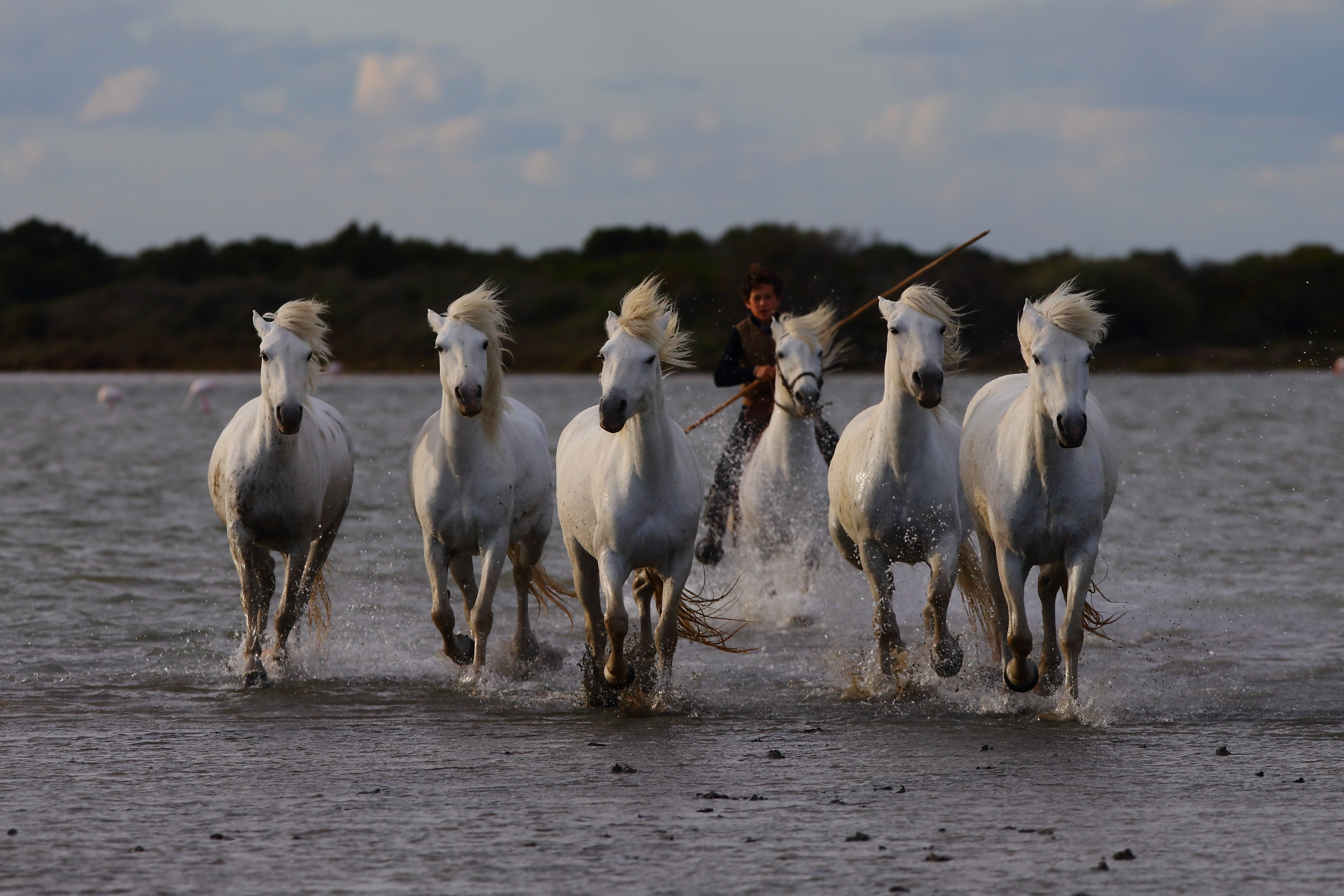
Gardian and horses near Saintes Maries de la Mer

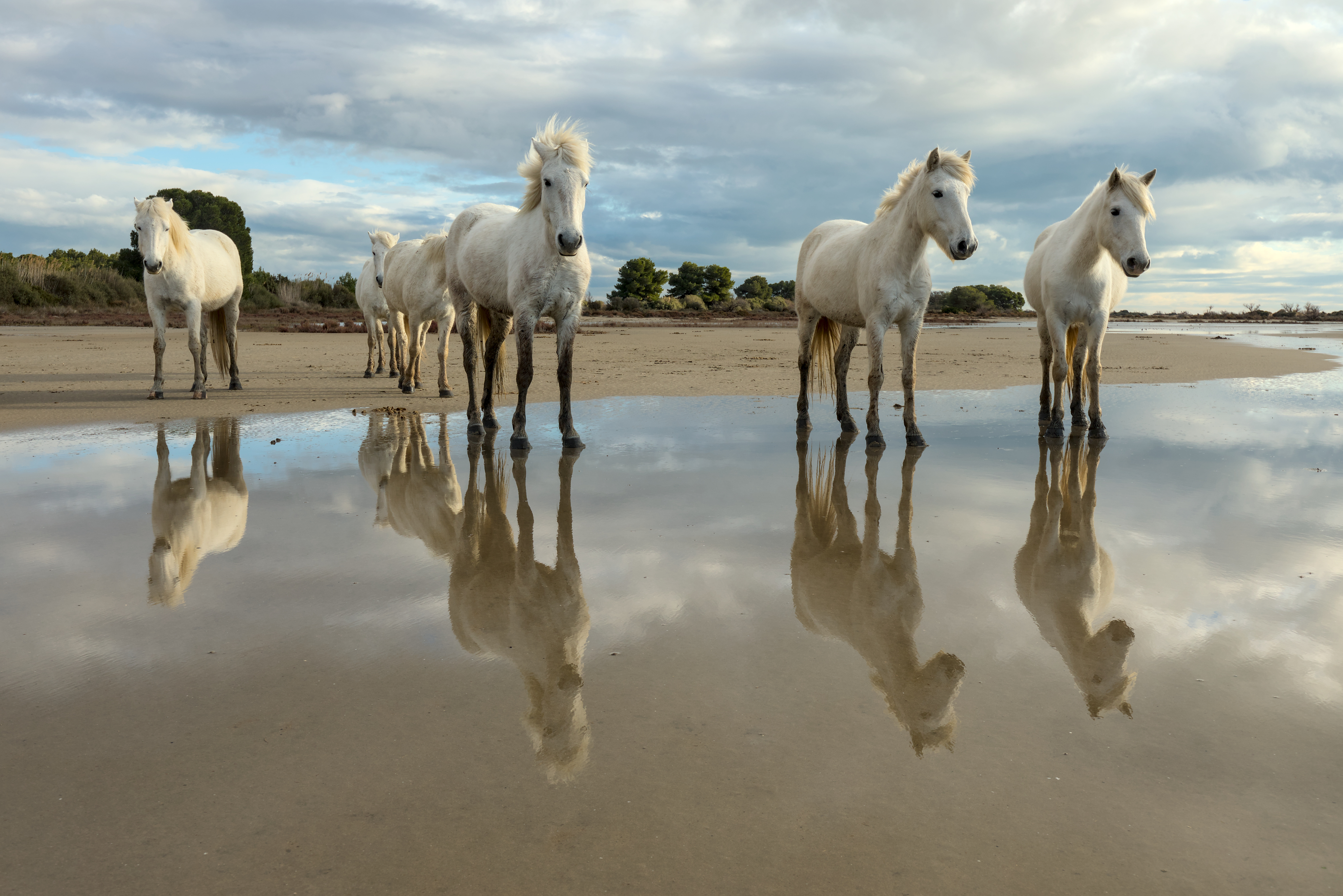
In Saint-Laurent-d'Aigouze

Specific terminology in Provençal is used when discussing Camargue horses or cattle:

- grignon or grignoun, a stallion
- rosso, a semi-feral horse
- anouble or court, a yearling
- doublen, a two-year-old
- ternen, a three-year-old
- quatren, a four-year-old
- cavalot, horse breeding in the Camargue area
- ferrade, branding
- gardian, a mounted herder
- gardianou, a young gardian
- manade, a small semi-feral herd

== Use ==
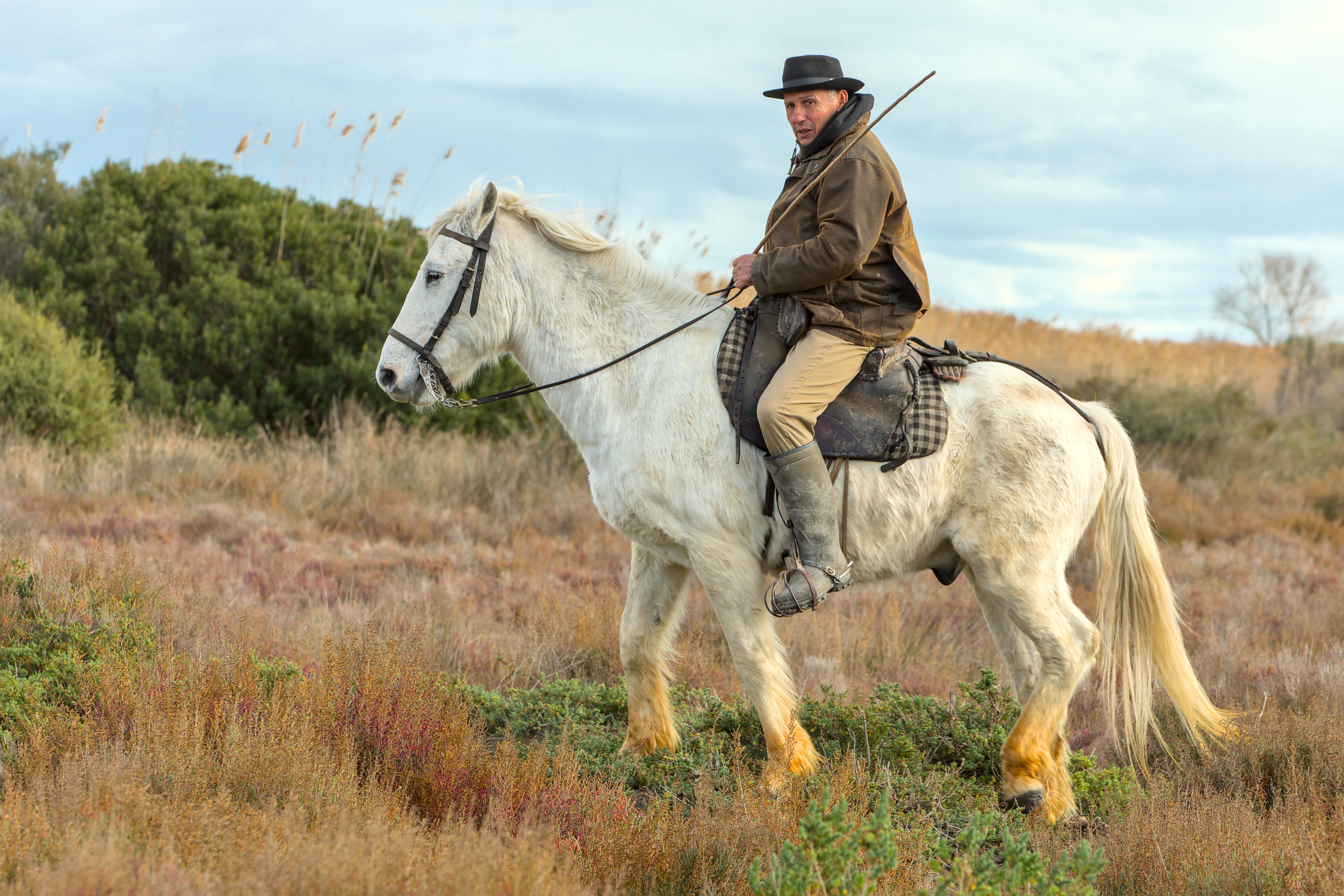
A gardian in 2025

The Camargue horse is the traditional mount of the gardian. It is used for livestock management – particularly of small semi-feral herds ('manades') of cattle of the Raço di Biòu (Camargue) breed or of the horses themselves, or of a mixture of the two – and in traditional activities such as the abrivado, the running of the bulls that precedes the course camarguaise. It may be used as a pack animal or in harness; it is ridden in competitive Camargue equitation and gardian games.
