= Working equitation =

Equestrian discipline

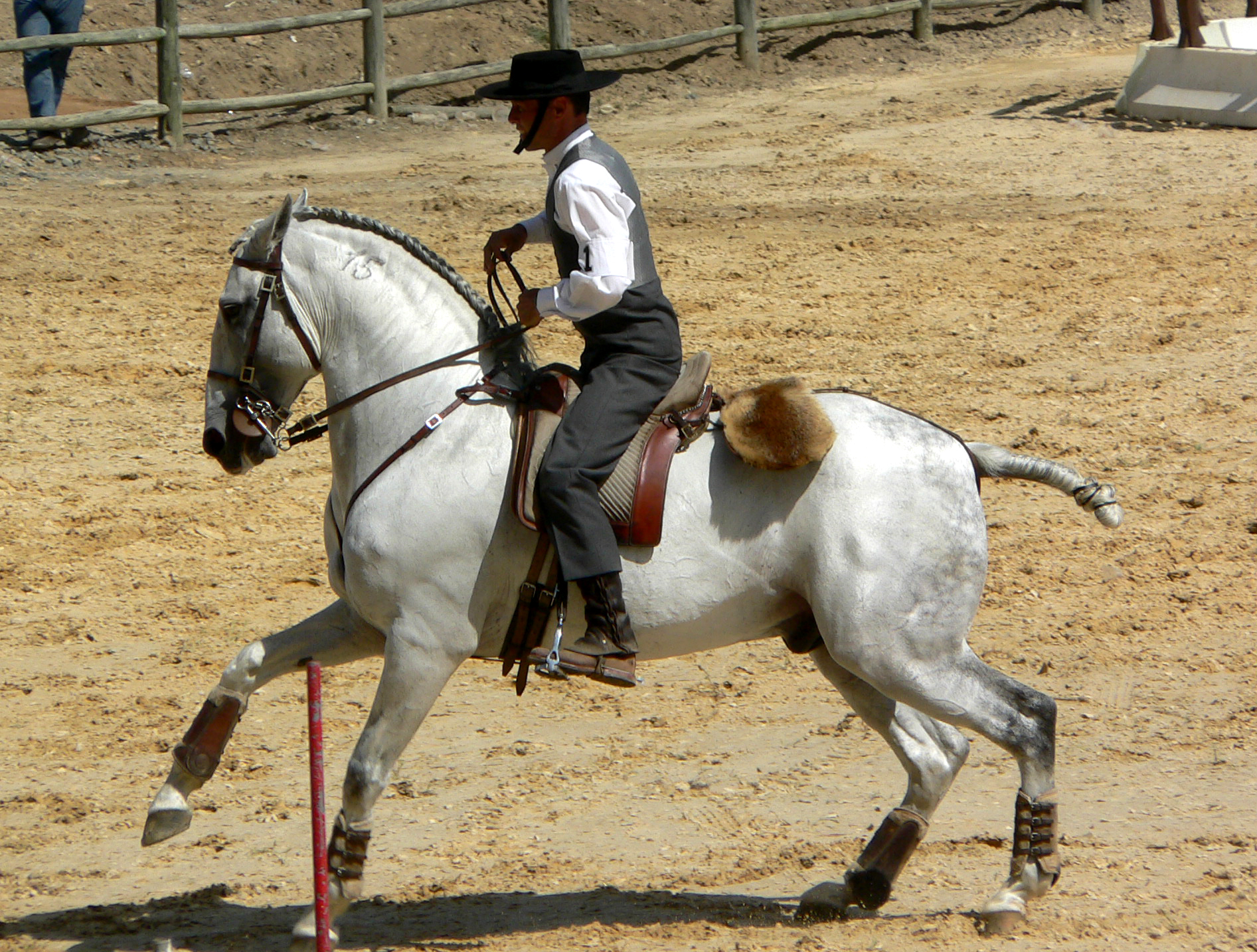
Equitação de Trabalho, Portuguese working equitation

Working equitation is an equestrian discipline with origins in the working riding traditions of France, Italy, Portugal and Spain. it is intended to showcase the ideal traits of working horses and riders. The world regulatory body is the World Association for Working Equitation.

== History ==
Working equitation originates in the working riding traditions of France, Italy, Portugal and Spain. It became an organised competitive sport in 1996, when the first European championship was held in Italy.

== Competition ==
Competitions may be individual or for teams, and are in three or four parts – the cow event is included only in team competitions.:

- Dressage, in which each individual horse and rider perform obligatory movements in a freestyle dressage test to music within a specified time scale
- Ease of Handling Trial, an individual event in which the horse must overcome obstacles similar to those likely to appear in the field, such as bridges and gates. The obstacle course is designed to show the partnership between horse and rider
- Speed, an individual event in which similar obstacles must be overcome, but against time
- Cow (only for team competitions), in which the three or four members of a team separate a specific numbered cow from a group.

== World Championships ==
The Team event at the 2010 European Working Equitation Championships was won by riders from Portugal.

The first Working Equitation World Championship was held from 11–13 October 2002 at Beja, Portugal, with teams from Brazil, France, Italy, Mexico, Portugal, Spain and the United Kingdom. The team from Portugal won the team event, and the individual competition was won by Fabio Lombardo of Brazil on Brilho do Rimo with 100 points.

In the second Working Equitation World Championship in Lisbon from 26 to 29 October 2006, there were teams from France, Italy, Mexico, Portugal, Spain and the United Kingdom. The Portuguese team won the team event for the second time in a row and David Duarte Oliveira of Portugal won the individual event with his horse Mulato.

The third World Championship was held five years later, from 26–30 October 2011, in Lyon, France. There were six national teams and 25 individual riders from 8 countries. The team from Portugal again won the team event, and Pedro Torres of Portugal won the individual event on Oxidado.

At the fourth World Championship, held at Ebreichsdorf in Austria from 5–8 June 2014, there were 28 individual entries from 10 countries, but only four national teams. The Portuguese team again won the team event and the four members of the team took the first four places in the individual event, which was won by Bruno Pica da Conceição and Trinco.
