= Camargue equitation =

Traditional horse riding from Camargue region of France

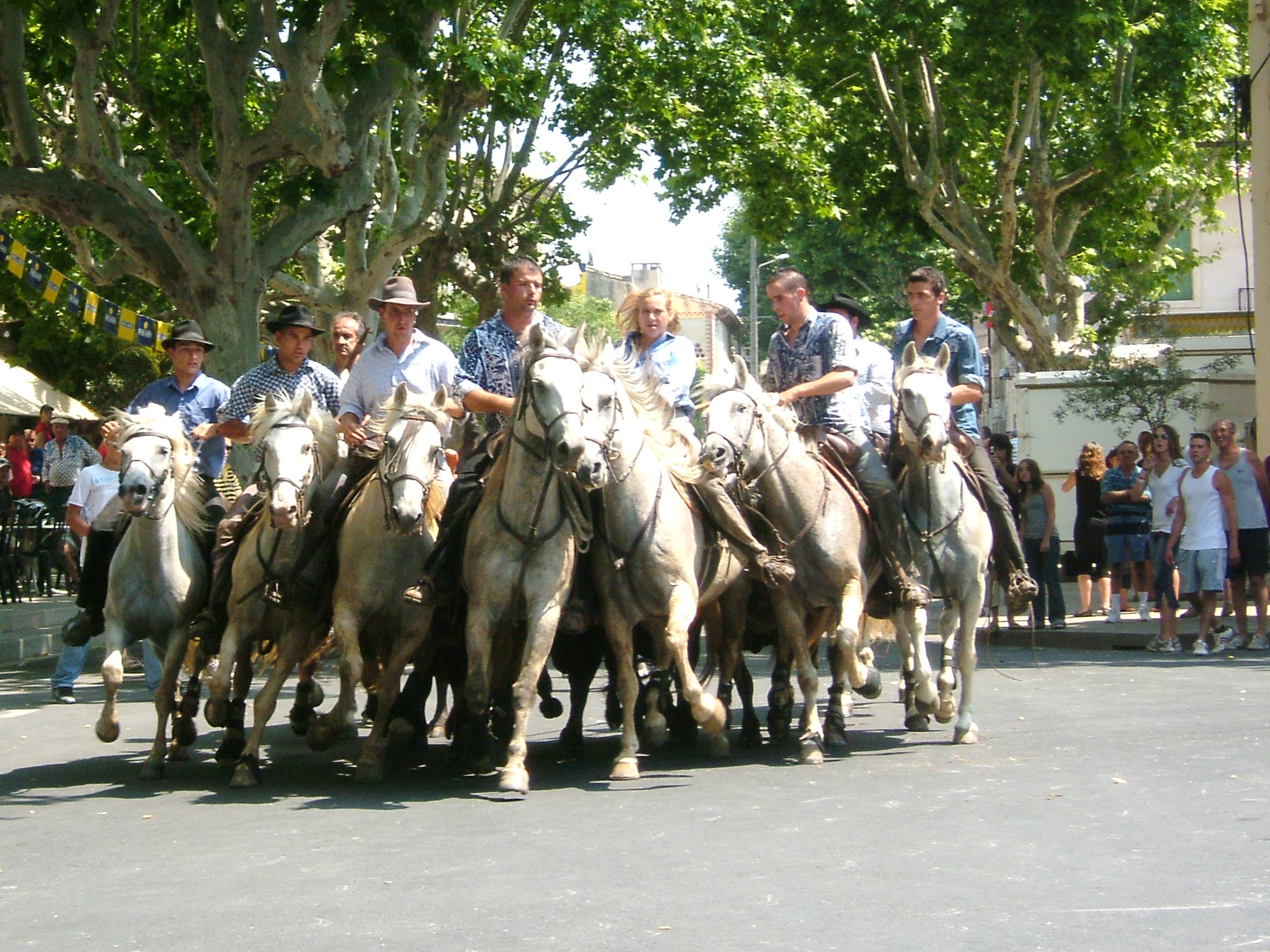
An abrivado at Calvisson. The gardians demonstrate their ability to contain and manoeuvre a group of bulls at speed

Camargue equitation (Occitan: equitacion de Camarga) is the traditional style of working equitation of the gardian herders of the Camargue region of southern France. It is closely associated with the Camargue horse, with Camargue cattle, and with the bouvino, the traditional cultural world of cattle farming in the Camargue.

== See also ==
- List of equestrian sports
