= Étang de Vaccarès =

Lake in France

Coordinates: 43°32′N 4°34′E

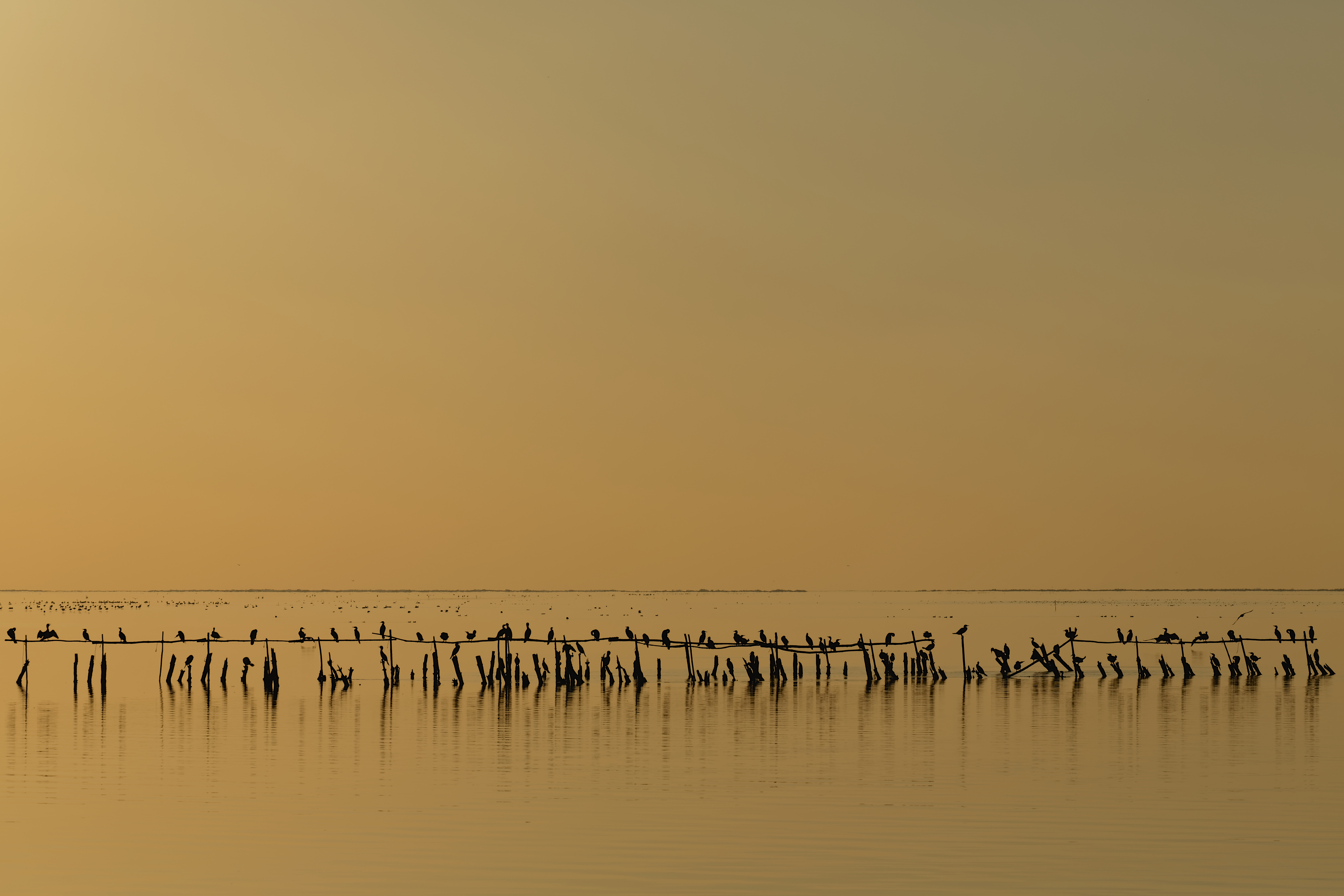
Cormorants at dusk on the pond of Vaccarès

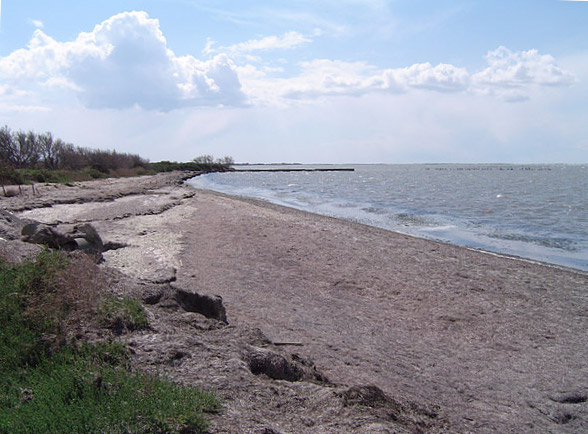
Shoreline of the Étang de Vaccarès

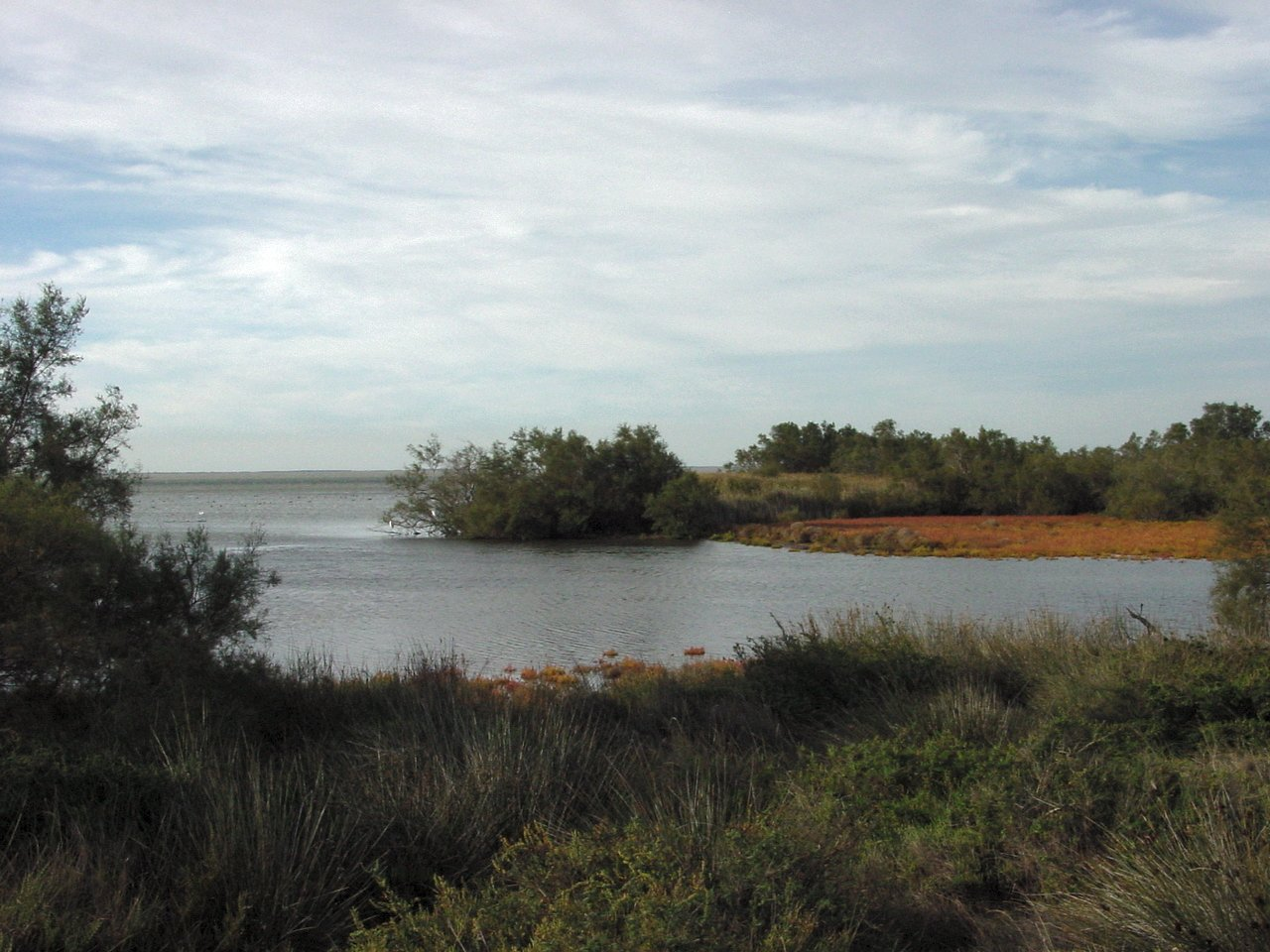
Shore of the Étang de Vaccarès

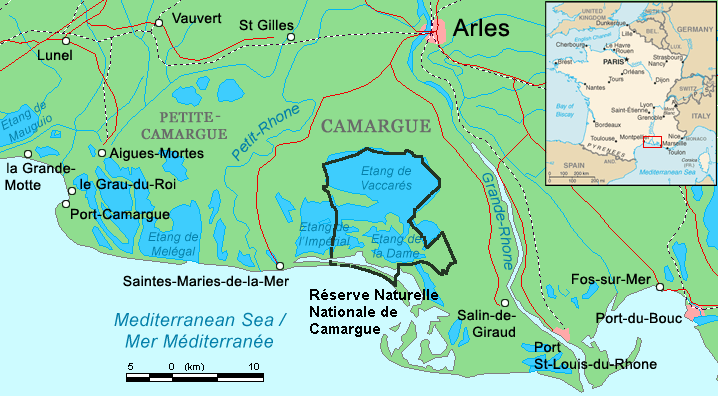
Map of the Camargue showing the location of the Étang de Vaccarès

Étang de Vaccarès (Occitan: Estanh de Vaccarès) is a lake, or, more accurately, a salt water lagoon (French: étang), in the wetlands of the Camargue in the delta of the River Rhône in southern France.

== Description ==
The lake has an area of 65 km^{2}, and the depth is less than two meters. It is the northernmost, and also the largest of the lakes of the Camargue, and constitutes the principal element in the water control system of the Rhône delta, which depends upon a strict management of water resources, through pumping, irrigation and draining stations making a complex network of channels throughout the river delta.

The lake is also an important place for rest and food for migratory birds, and it also has a population of the greater flamingo. Because of its importance for wild birds, the Étang de Vaccarès with its surrounding wetlands has been protected as a nature reserve since 1927, and in 1972 it was incorporated into the Parc Régional de Camargue.

== Pollution ==
Even though the lake is «protected», it is nevertheless exposed to the repercussions of pollution from the large industrial parks nearby, and runoff from the surrounding agricultural areas. Studies show that fish from the lake contains significant levels of contamination.
