= Gardian =

Mounted cattle herdsman in southern France

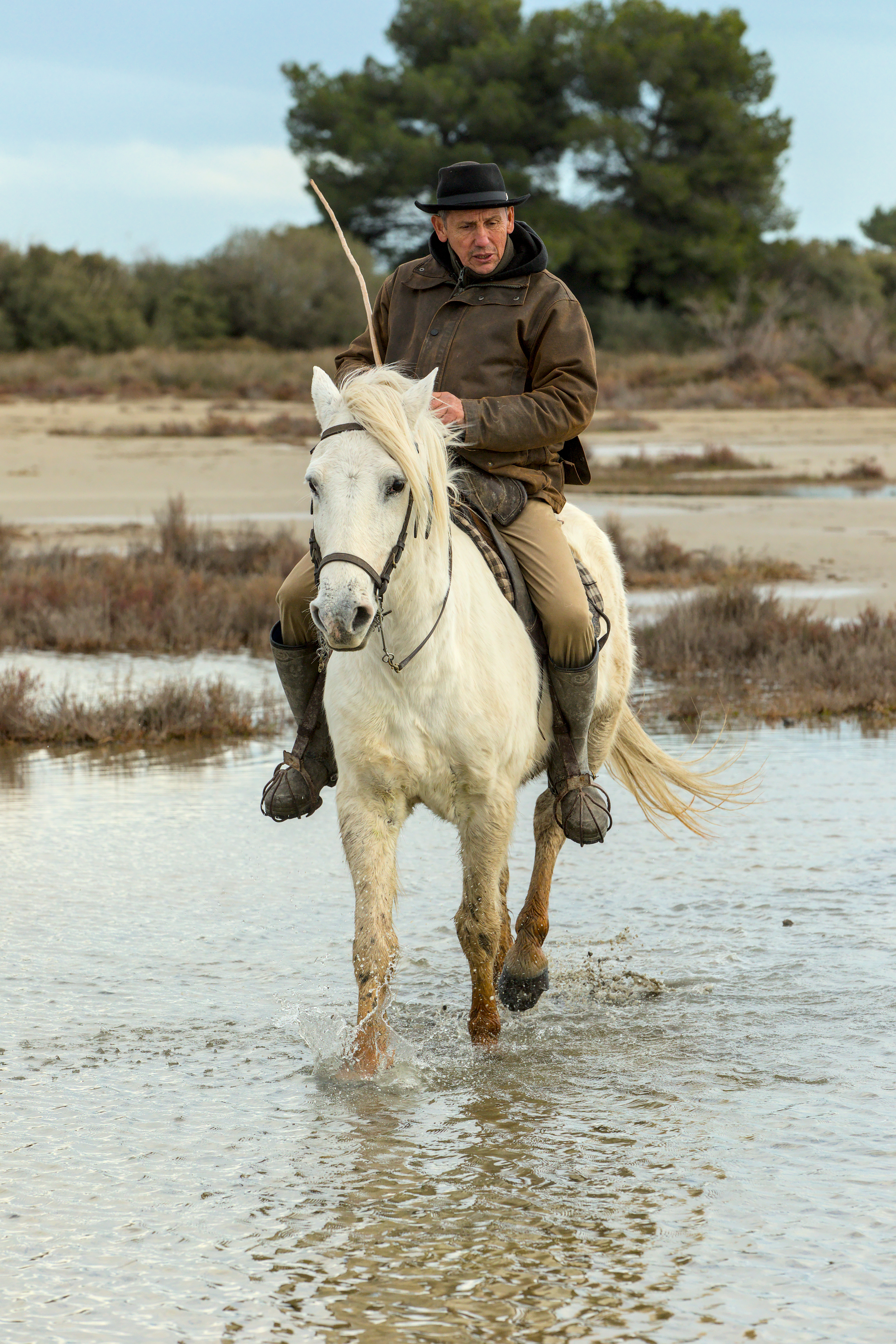
A gardian in Saint-Laurent-d'Aigouze, France.

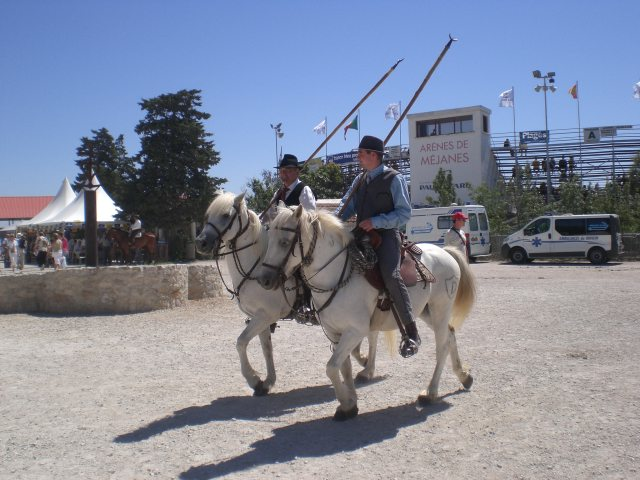
Gardians at the arena of Méjanes, in Arles, France

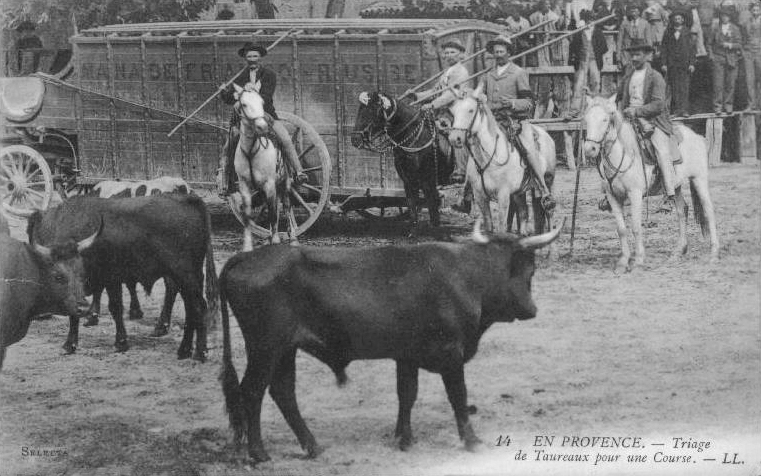
Gardians selecting bulls from a manade for use in the course camarguaise, Camargue, France, early twentieth century

A gardian (lit. 'guardian') is a mounted cattle herdsman in the Camargue delta in Provence, southern France. The work is akin to that of the Mexican charro, the North American cowboy, the Tuscan buttero or the Portuguese campino. Gardians ride Camargue horses.

== See also ==
- Camargue cattle
- Camargue equitation
- Manade
