= Semi-feral =

Animal that lives predominantly in a feral state with some human contact

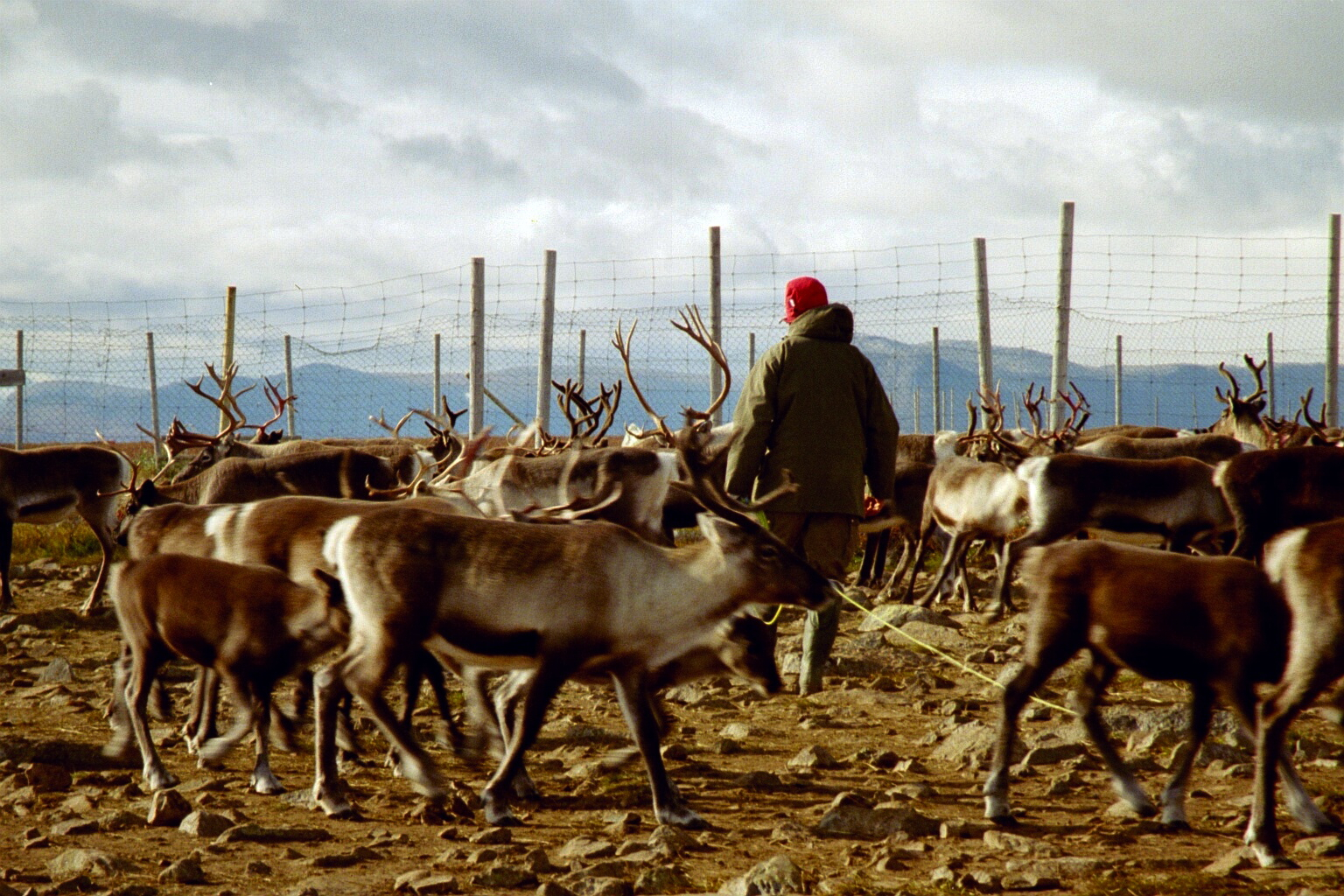
Few living reindeer are truly wild. Many are herded in a semi-feral state.

A semi-feral animal lives predominantly in a feral state but has some contact and experience with humans. This may be because it was born in a domesticated state and then reverted to life in wild conditions, or it may be an animal that grew up in essentially wild conditions but has developed a comfort level with humans through feeding, receiving medical care, or similar contacts.

== Species of semi-feral animals ==
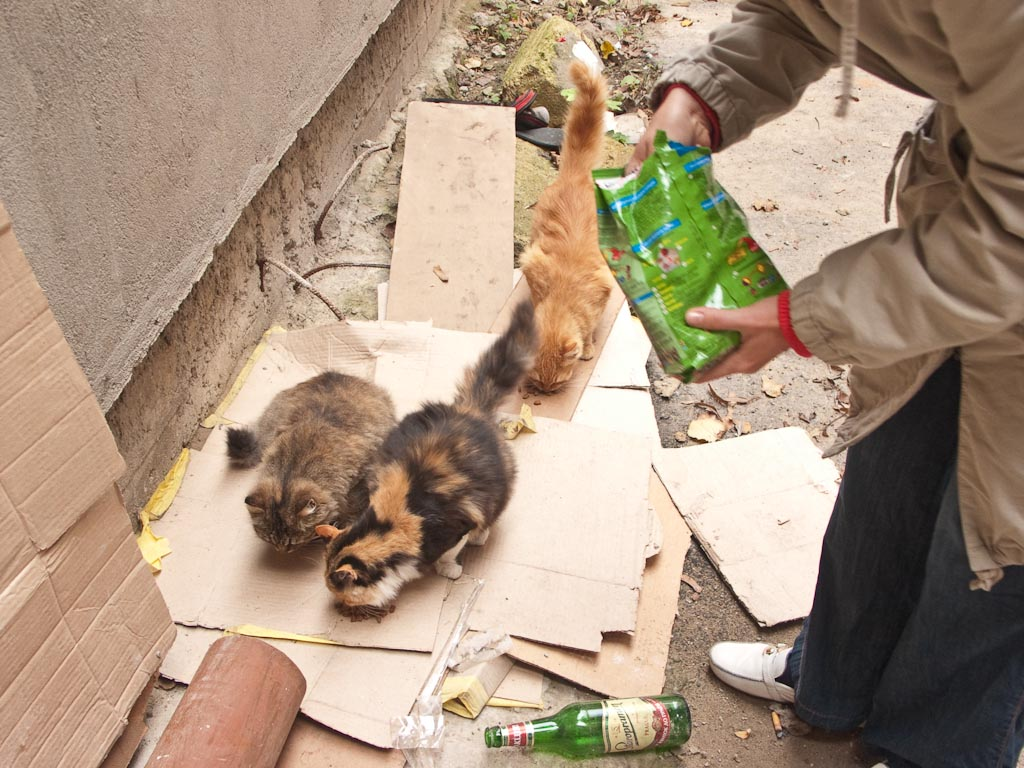
Stray cats in Odessa

Semi-feral or stray cats are a common example of animals that live in proximity to humans who may be accustomed to their presence but have no owner; they are distinct from feral cats, which have no regular food source. They are usually regularly fed in locations where food is left for no one cat in particular, and they find shelter "accidentally", such as in farm buildings, and sometimes deliberately from humans. A common reason to tolerate and even nourish these cats is so they kill vermin, or because of a general favorable feeling toward cats. Usually semi-ownership of cats contributes to cat overpopulation and excessive breeding when people nourish but do not neuter the cats. Some studies claim this can be disastrous for wild animal species, especially birds and a great number of bird species have become extinct because of domesticated cats which were not kept inside, although this is disputed in the scientific literature.

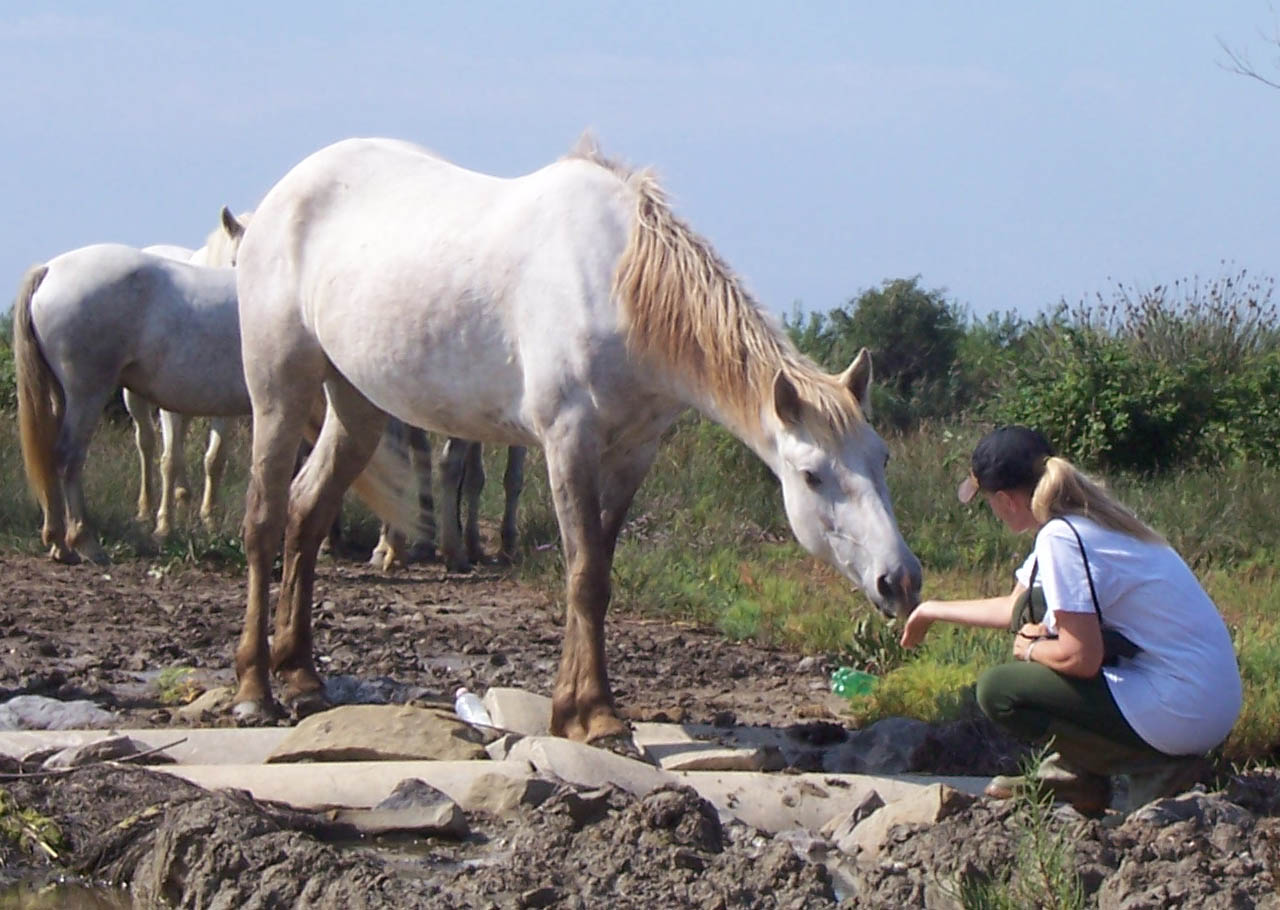
A naturally approached Camargue horse in northeastern Italy

Of horse breeds, the French Camargue was once thought of as a wild species, though increased contact with humans has made it semi-feral. These horses still breed in herds and graze throughout plains unhindered, though ranchers (known as gardians, "Camargue cowboys", and manadiers, "ranchers") regularly round them up to check on newborn foals. If captured, Camargue horses, generally steady-footed and considered reliable, are usually used to herd cattle. Other types of mostly free-ranging horses, such as those in Iberia and the Exmoor, New Forest, Fell pony and Dartmoor ponies, have owners which distinguishes them from truly feral horses, such as the American Mustang or Australian Brumby.

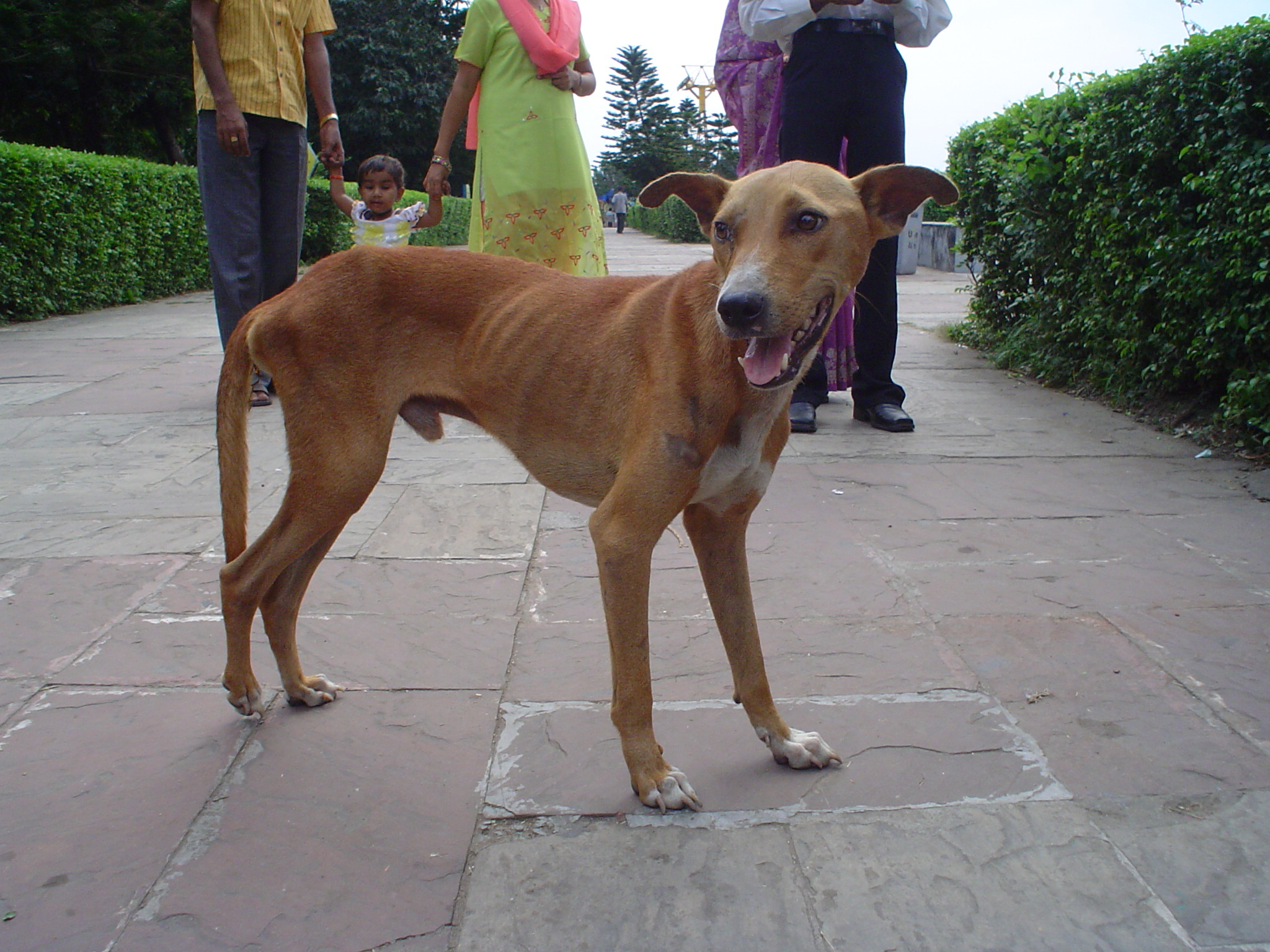
Stray dog in Kolkata

A high mortality rate exists among free-ranging dogs (often called "strays"), even those supported by humans; the stray dog population is often replenished by domestic dogs. Most abandoned dogs in the Western world are taken to shelters, except in some dense North American urban centers and rural Southern Europe, particularly Italy, where abandoned dogs become feral or semi-feral. Some semi-feral dogs that receive a substantial portion of their diet from humans can afford to exert energy hunting prey; many dogs are unsuccessful hunters without human support. Semi-feral dogs are more likely to transmit disease than their domestic counterparts. Local cultural attitudes make how humans interact with stray dogs quite variable.

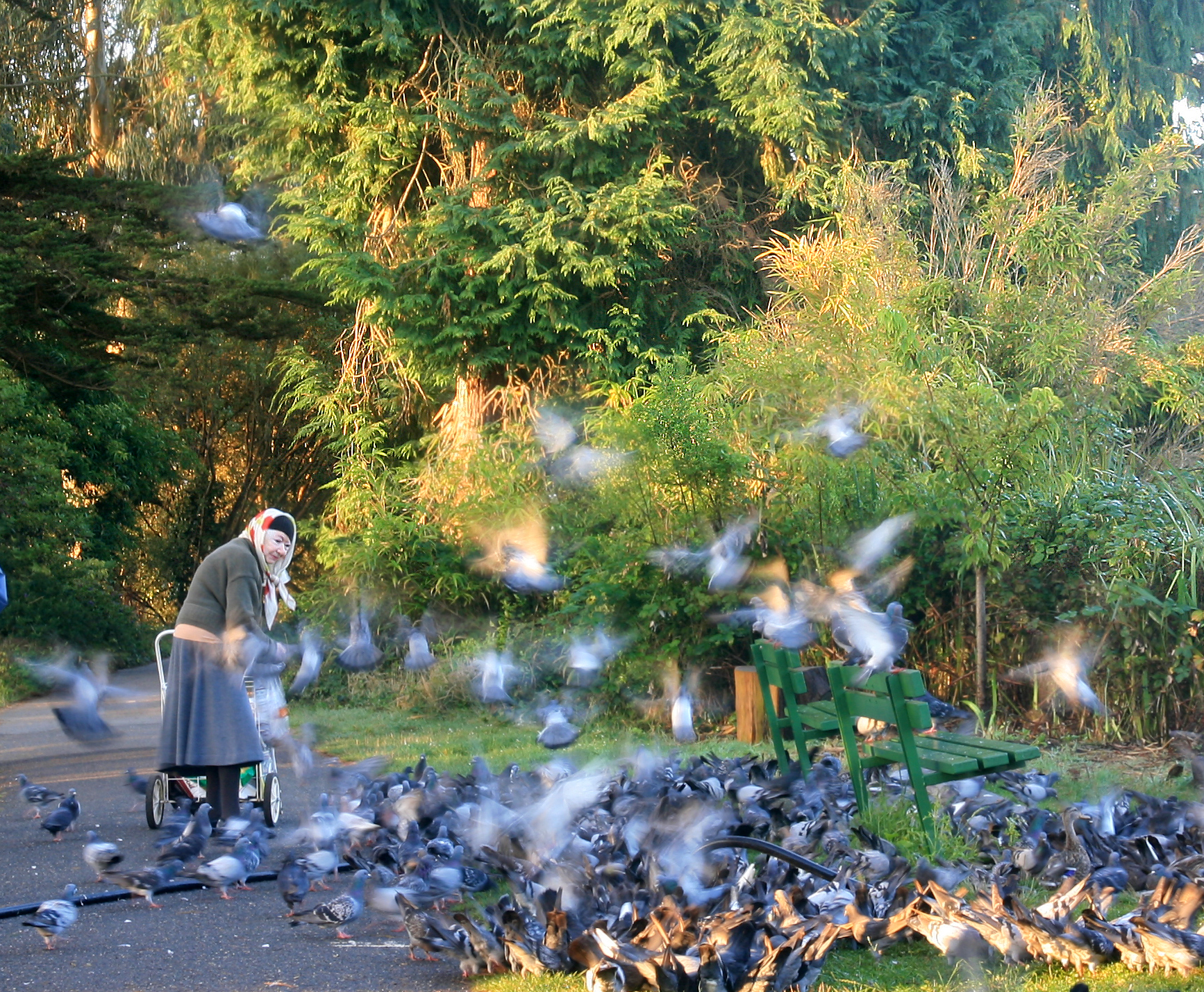
Wild pigeons feeding in San Francisco

Many types of birds can be semi-feral, including mute swans, mallards, and barbary doves. Perhaps the best-known semi-feral bird is the pigeon, which people have been known to attract to their households for some 3,000 years. It is difficult to raise pigeons—they are monogamous, altricial, and require large spaces for flight—so a semi-feral method of trapping is presently the most efficient. From Egypt to West Africa large buildings have been constructed for the purpose of attracting semi-feral pigeons, some holding up to 1,000.

Bagot goats live semi-ferally in Blithfield Hall in Staffordshire, England, where they were introduced in the 14th century. Buffalo can become feral when abandoned; in northern Australia, they are raised for slaughter despite not being fully domesticated. The semi-feral Corriente cattle were killed for poor-quality beef in the 20th century and are now often used in rodeo. Semi-feral sheep have existed throughout Europe.

== See also ==
- Domestication
- Invasive species
- Overpopulation in domestic pets
- Fell pony

== Bibliography ==
- Arlin, Ferne (2005), Adventure Guide to Provence and the Côte D'Azur, Hunter Publishing, ISBN 9781588435057
- Blench, Roger; MacDonald, Kevin (2006), The Origins and Development of African Livestock: Archaeology, Genetics, Linguistics and Ethnography, Routledge, ISBN 9781135434168
- Bradshaw, John W. S. (2012), The Behaviour of the Domestic Cat, Centre for Agriculture and Bioscience International, ISBN 9781780641201
- Hill, Desmond (1988), "semi-feral" Cattle and Buffalo Meat Production in the Tropics, Longman Scientific & Technical, ISBN 9780582608955
- Lever, Christopher (2010), Naturalised Birds of the World, A & C Black, ISBN 9781408128251
- Lewis, Celia (2014), The Illustrated Guide to Cows: How To Choose Them – How To Keep Them, Bloomsbury Publishing, ISBN 9781408187067
- Long, John L. (2003), Introduced Mammals of the World: Their History, Distribution and Influence, CSIRO Publishing, ISBN 9780643099166
- Ossola, Alessandro; Niemelä, Jari (2017), Urban Biodiversity: From Research to Practice, Routledge, ISBN 9781315402567
- Ransom, Jason I.; Kaczensky, Petra (2016), Wild Equids: Ecology, Management, and Conservation, Johns Hopkins University Press, ISBN 9781421419091
- Roots, Clive (2007), Domestication, Greenwood Publishing Group, ISBN 9780313339875
- Roth, Harald H. (1997), Wildlife Resources: A Global Account of Economic Use, Springer Science+Business Media, ISBN 9783540613572
- Sandøe, Peter; Corr, Sandra; Palmer, Clare (2015), Companion Animal Ethics, John Wiley & Sons, ISBN 9781118376713
- Serpell, James (2016), The Domestic Dog: Its Evolution, Behavior and Interactions with People, Cambridge University Press, ISBN 9781316817681
- Toukhsati, Samia R.; Bennett, Pauleen C.; Coleman, Grahame J. (2007), "Behaviors and Attitudes towards Semi-Owned Cats", Anthrozoös, 20 (2): 131–142, doi:10.2752/175303707X207927, S2CID 143560925

Morland, Carole S. (2008), A walk on the Wildside, Hayloft Publishing Ltd, ISBN 9781904524588
