= Manade =

Semi-feral group of Camargue cattle or horses

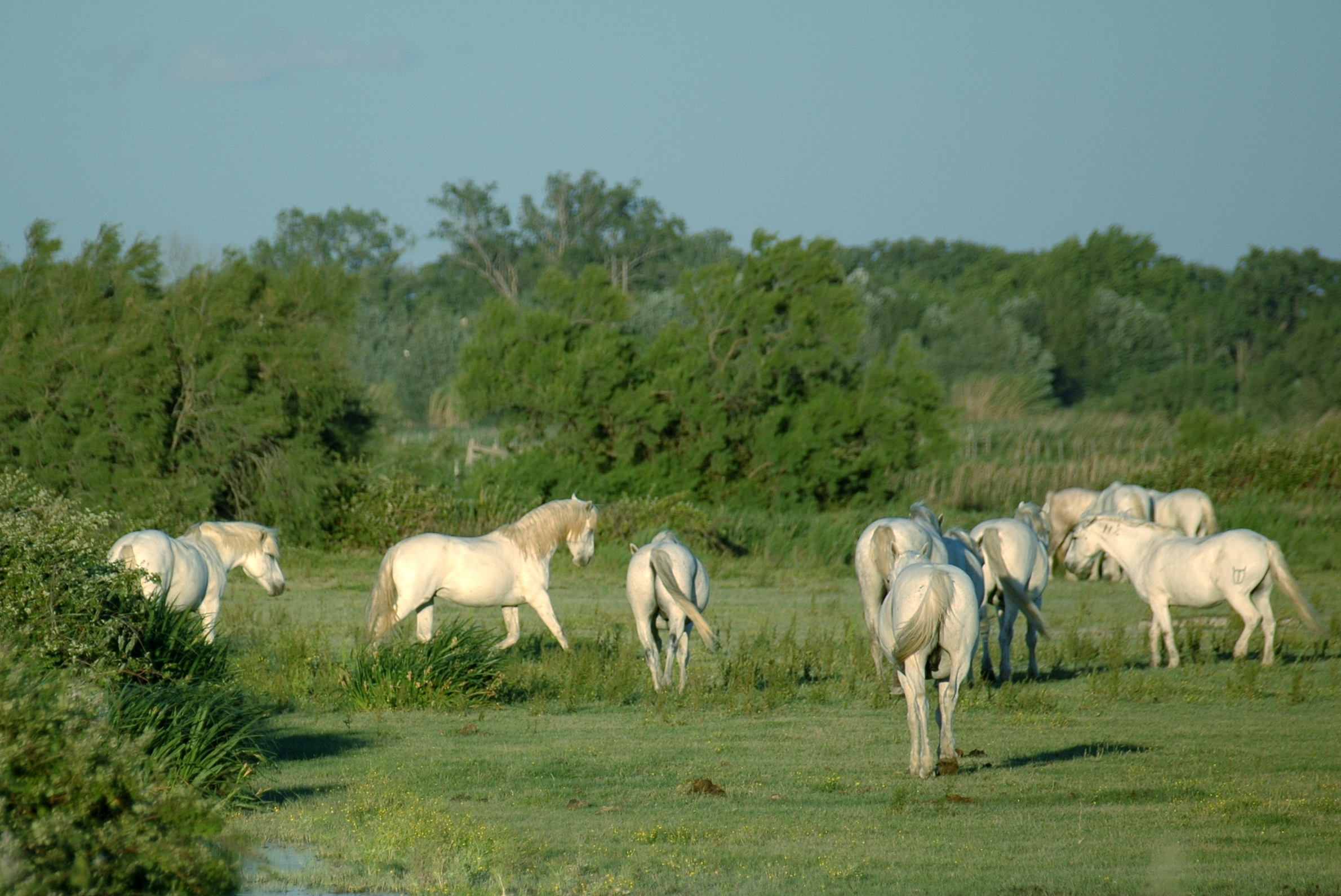
A manade of Camargue horses means at least four mares in reproductive age living together on at least 20 hectares.

A manade (prov. menada, originally from lat. manus = hand) is a term used mainly in the Camargue area in France for a semi-feral group of Camargue cattle or horses led by a gardian, or herder. In French, the word manade dates from 1867. In older texts it also referred to herds of sheep, but modern use of the term is limited only to raising groups of larger livestock.

Raising animals in manades is specific for the Crau, Camargue (Provence) and Petite Camargue (Languedoc) regions of France, and therefore the term itself is strongly associated with the same area.

== Defining a manade ==
=== Conditions of breeding ===
In 1967 the Camargue Horse Breeders' Association of France (Association des éleveurs de chevaux de race Camargue or AECRC) defined the term manade to refer to the "extensive breeding" of horses at liberty and out of doors in groups of at least four mares of reproductive age and grazing on at least 20 hectares (49 acres).

"Extensive breeding" means that the animals move around freely looking for suitable vegetation for their feed and that no extra feed in provided. As a rule the role of the gardian is minimal: with the exception of emergencies, the animals are gathered up only once a year for a health check, branding and gelding of selected males.

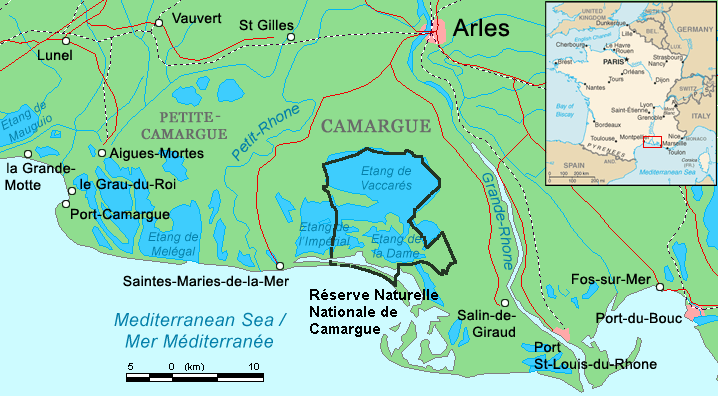
The term manade is strongly associated with the Camargue area.

Since both cattle and horses have long been raised in the same fashion in the same areas, inter-species herds are often formed. Even the terminology referring to animals of different age as well as some terms of herding apply to both horses and cattle. Each individual breeder has their unique brand for marking the animals on the left haunch.

Today, the Haras Nationaux, the French national association of horse breeders, has further refined the definition of living conditions for animals in a manade: "a manade means raising Camargue horses in freedom with at least four mares in reproductive age stationed the year long in the native area of the breed (berceau de la race), in an area with only one animal over 18 months of age per two hectares in an area of at least 20 hectares owned or rented by an individual."

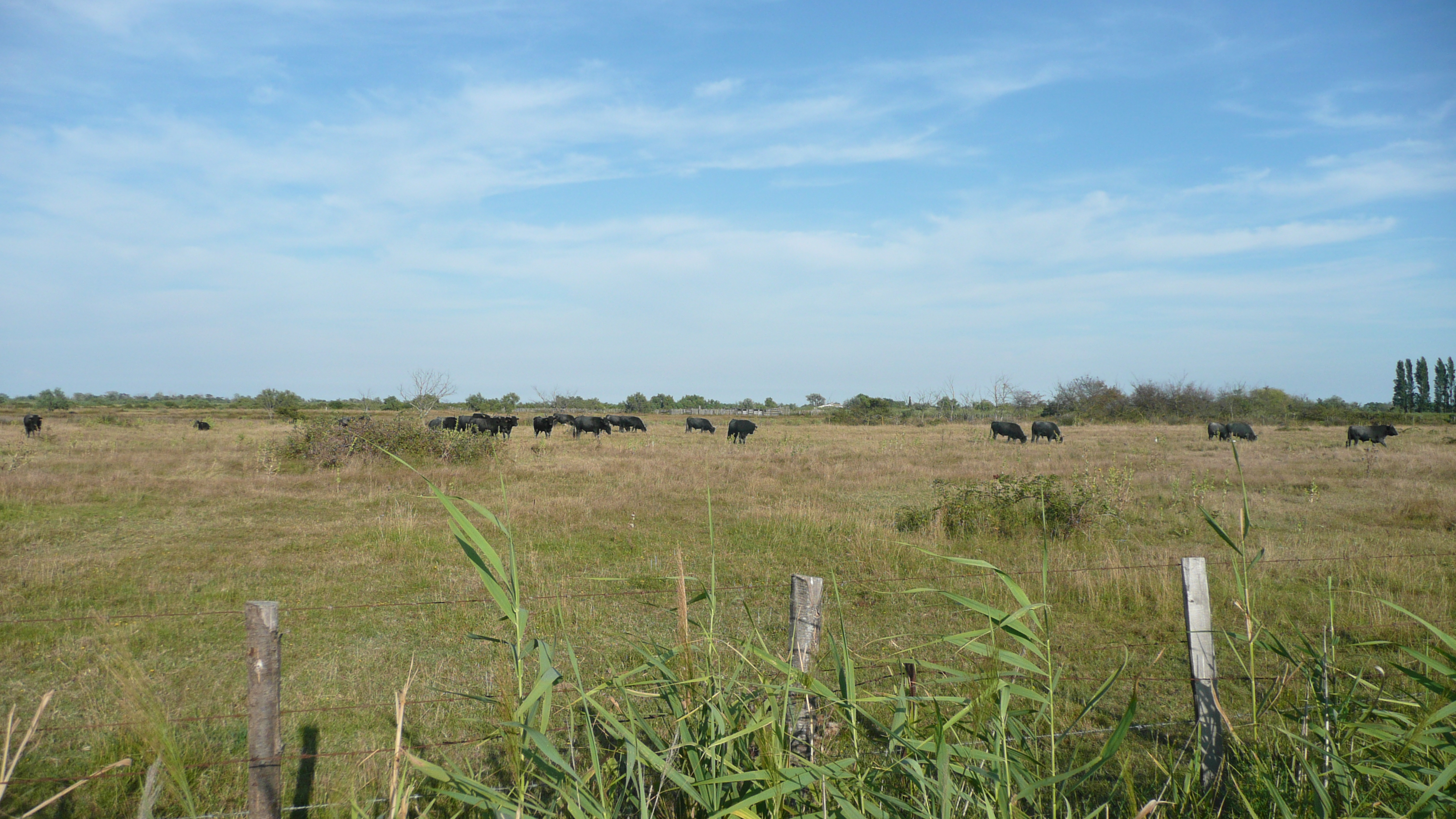
Camargue cattle must be grown in manade style to merit AOC-label.

The rules for raising Camargue cattle in a way meriting the use of the AOC-label (Taureau de Camargue Appellation d'origine contrôlée, "controlled designation of origin" ), are much in the same vein: both dry and humid areas necessary, six months of grazing in a humid area obligatory each year, "extensive breeding," less than 1 grown animal per 1.5 hectares (3.7 acres) of heath or pasture.

=== Names of breeding establishments ===
The term manade is often seen in names of different establishments related to cattle and horse breeding. A manade is led by a manadier (bayle in Provençal). As regards horse breeding, only breeders who raise their animals in manades in the native area of the breed are entitled to use the word Manade in the name of their establishment. All others must be called Élevage or ranch. Horses are always present even if a Manade specialises in cattle, since by tradition the Camargue horse is the only mount of a gardian.

=== Further development ===
By tradition all manades have to do with raising large animals, but a Paris-based trade name for a manufacturer of office items such as desk accessories and lamps seems to indicate a trend towards additional uses for the term.
