= Camargue cattle =

Camargue cattle may refer to:

- the Brava, a breed of cattle reared in the Camargue
- the Raço di Biòu, a breed of cattle reared in the Camargue
