= Cross of Camargue =

Symbol of the French region: cross, heart, anchor

Camargue cross
- Artist: Hermann-Paul
- Year: 1926

The Camargue cross (Occitan: Cros de Camarga, French: Croix camarguaise), or the cross of Camargue or cross of the gardians, is a symbol for the French region of Camargue, created in 1926 by the painter Hermann-Paul at the request of Folco de Baroncelli-Javon to represent the "Camargue nation" of herdsmen and fishermen. It embodies the three theological virtues of Christianity: faith (represented by tridents of gardians on a Christian cross), hope (represented by the anchor of sinners), and charity (represented by the heart of The Three Marys).

== Background ==
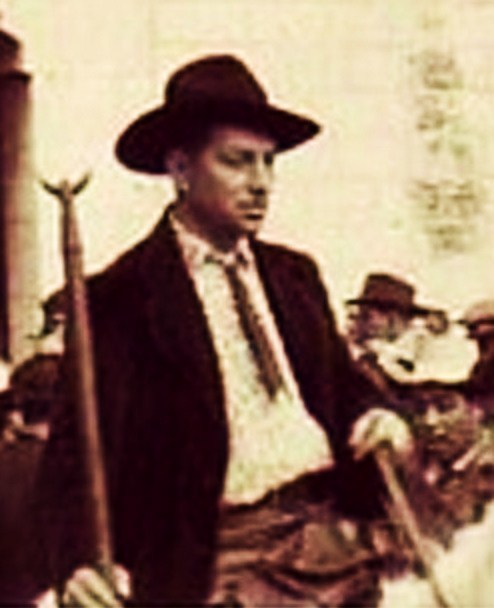
The poet Joseph d'Arbaud with a gardian's trident

The Camargue cross was designed in 1926 by the painter-illustrator Hermann-Paul (1864–1940), at the request of his friend the marquis-writer-manadier Folco de Baroncelli (1869–1943), considered to be the "Inventor" of the Camargue. After having founded the Nacioun Gardiano association in 1904, to "maintain and glorify the costume, customs and traditions of the country of Arles, the Camargue and the bullfighting countries", he was inspired by the naval anchors to represent with this cross the "Camargue nation" of herdsmen and fishermen.

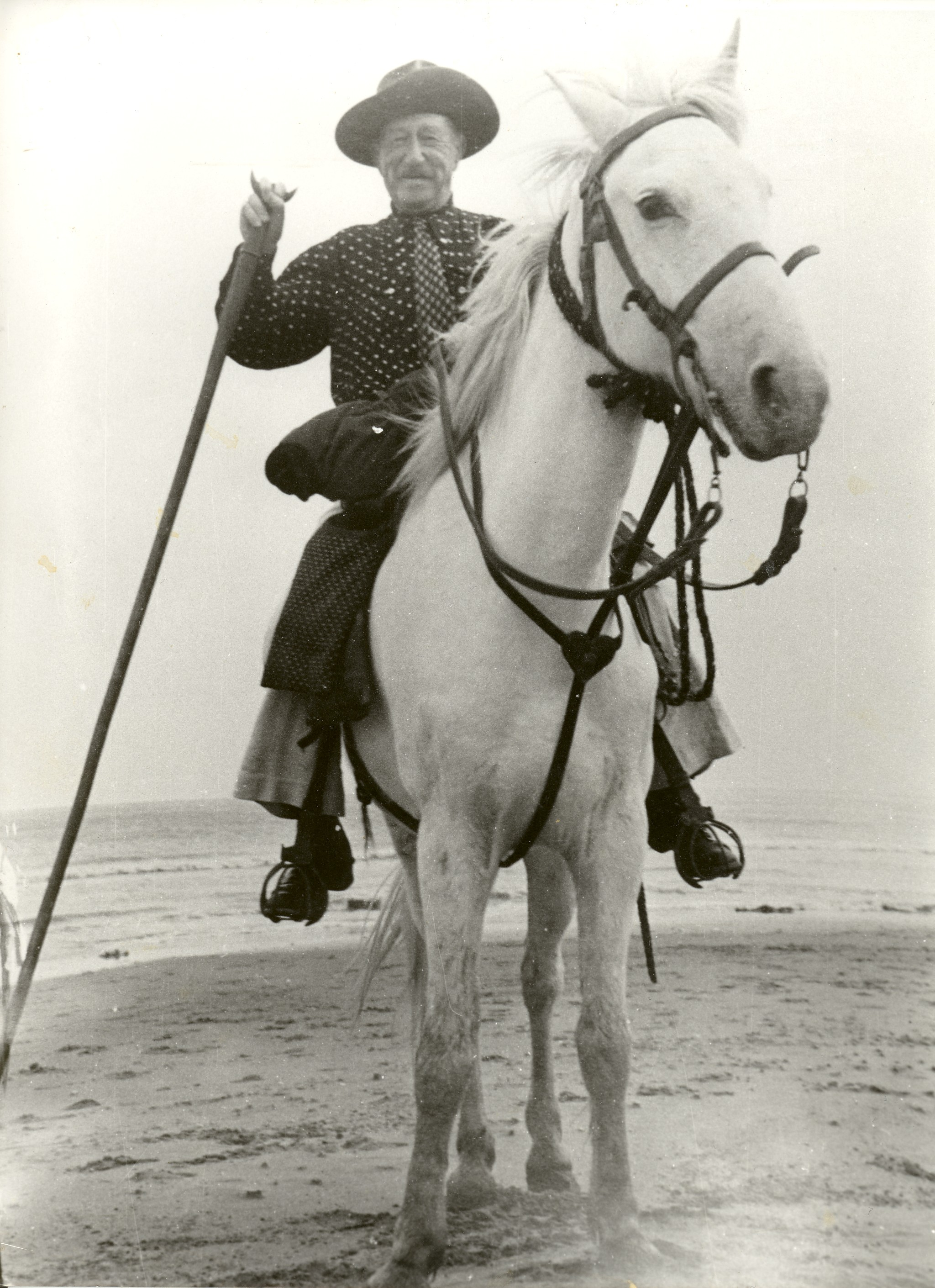
The marquess-writer-manadier Folco de Baroncelli (1869–1943)

The poet Joseph d'Arbaud carried a gardian's trident made in wrought iron for him by Joseph Barbanson, a blacksmith from Saintes-Maries-de-la-Mer, in his workshop at Place de la Révolution (now Place du Grenier à Sel). It was d'Arbaud who suggested replacing the three fleur-de-lis (on a cross anchory) that were planned with camargue tridents as a symbol of the region.

The statue was inaugurated by the Committee of Friends of the Marquis de Baroncelli on July 7, 1926, in Saintes-Maries-de-la-Mer on a platform next to the post office (opposite the current "Grand Large" building). During this celebration, many personalities, including the Marquis de Baroncelli and his friends, were present: the poet Joseph d'Arbaud, Rul d'Elly, Maguy Hugo (granddaughter of Victor Hugo), Madame de la Garanderie, Fanfonne Guillierme, the family of the owners of Maison Aubanel, Pauline Ménard-Dorian, and her husband, the painter Hermann-Paul.

The cross was transferred ten years later to the Pont du Mort (or the Maure), at the western entrance to the village on the road to Aigues-Mortes. After being slightly moved, the original cross was stolen. A copy of the original still stands there. In July 2016, the Camargue cross celebrated its 90th anniversary.

It is seen throughout all of Camargue. It is also present in Marseille (Notre-Dame de la Garde basilica, Church of Saint-Pierre-ès-Liens de l'Estaque, esplanade de la Bonne Mère), in Toulon, in Istres, and in Avignon. The town of Radolfzell, Germany, is a twin city with Istres, so the cross can be found there.

== Symbolism ==
The Camargue cross symbolizes the "Camargue Nation" (or "Gardian Nation") by associating the symbols of the gardians, fishermen and Holy Marys of the Camargue. With its elements of early Christian symbolism, it embodies the three theological virtues:

- Faith (represented by tridents of the gardians on a Christian cross);
- Hope (represented by the anchor, which also represents fishermen); and
- Charity (represented by the symbol of the heart of the Marys of the Sea).

== Gallery ==
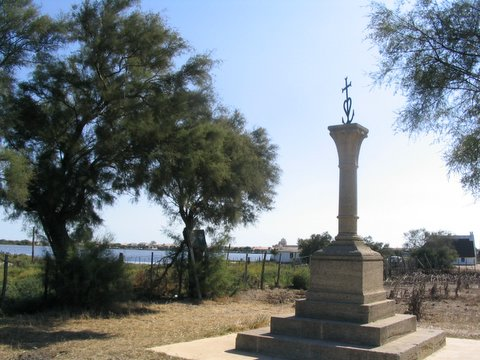
1930 replica of the first Camargue cross at Saintes-Maries-de-la-Mer

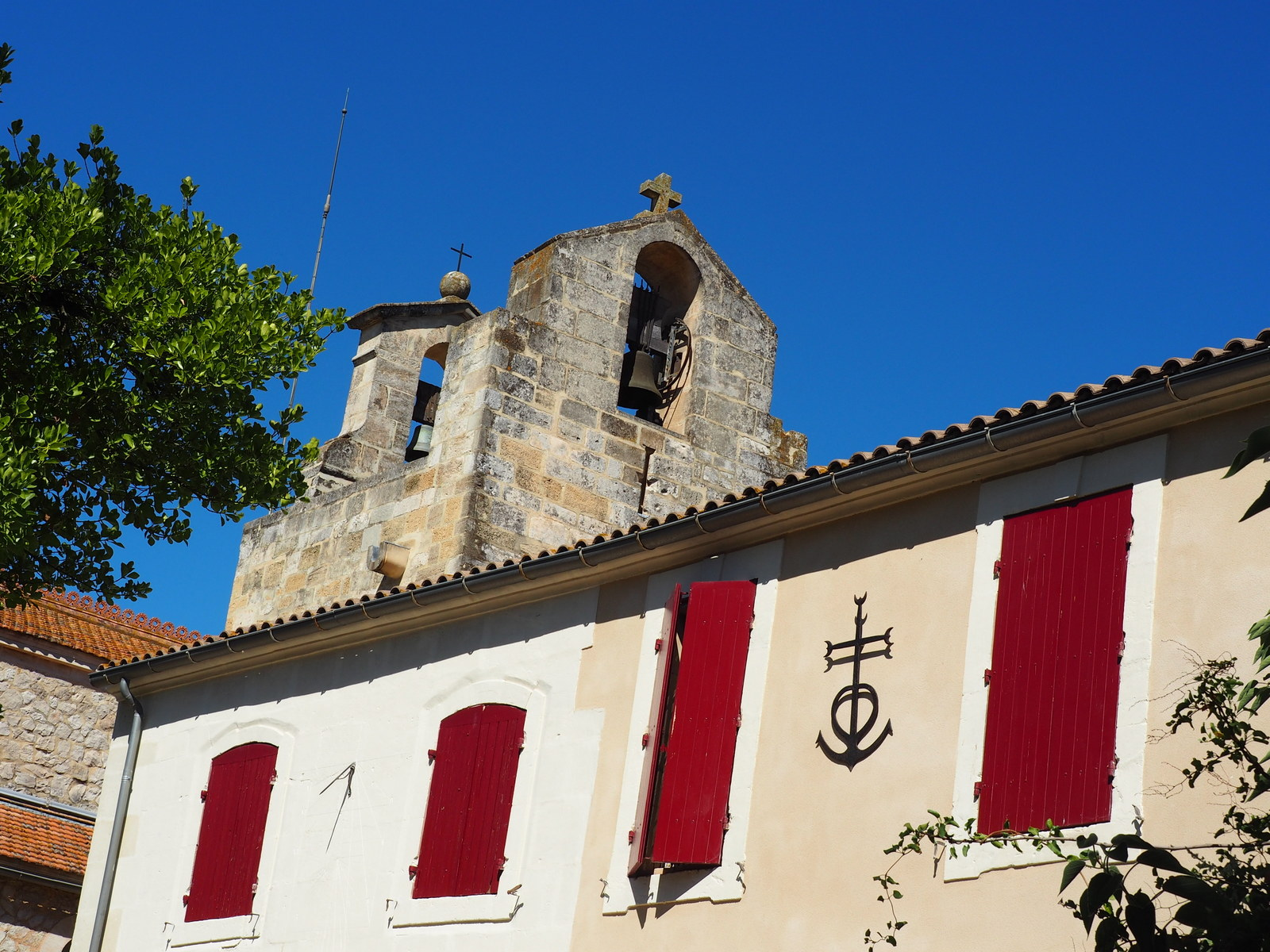
Saint-Martin-de-Crau

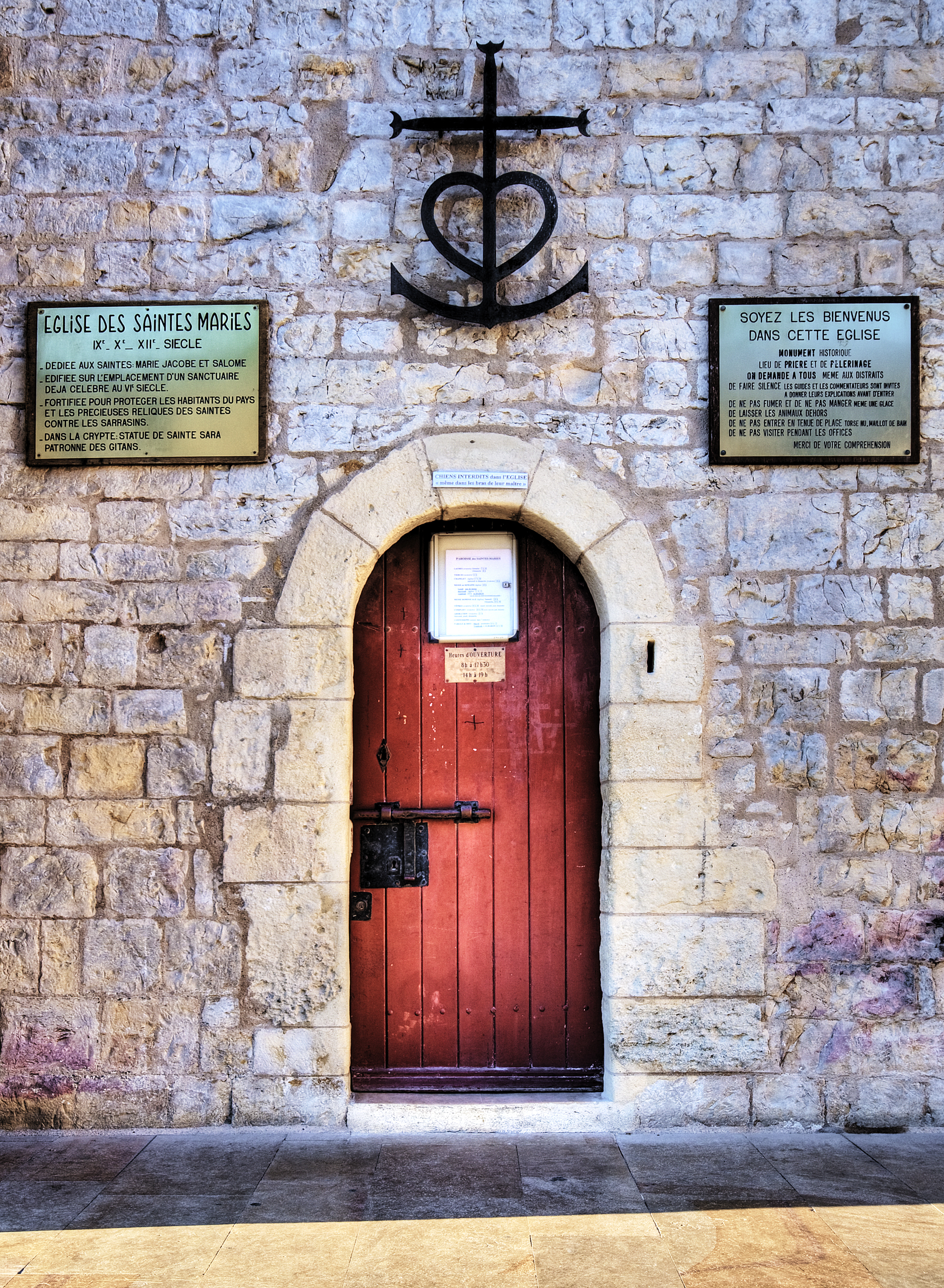
Church of the Saintes Maries de la Mer

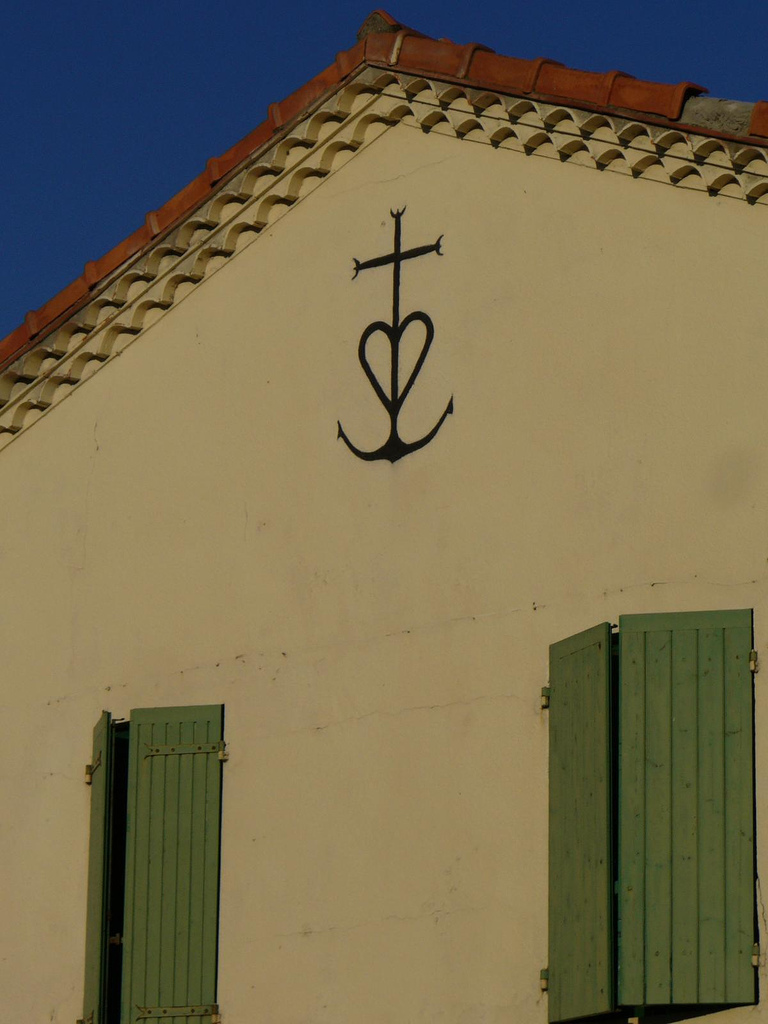
House of Saintes-Maries-de-la-Mer

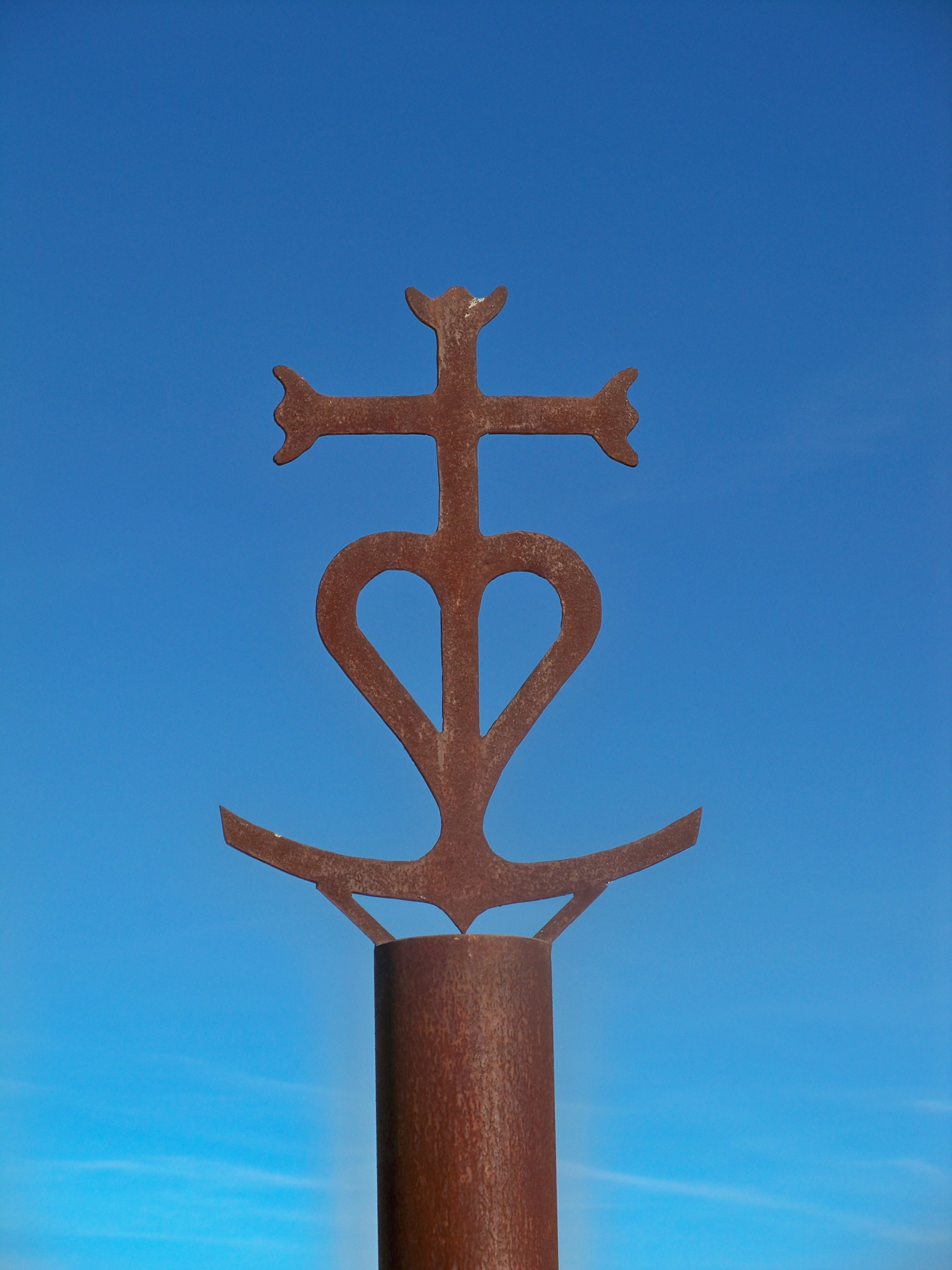
mas de Méjanes

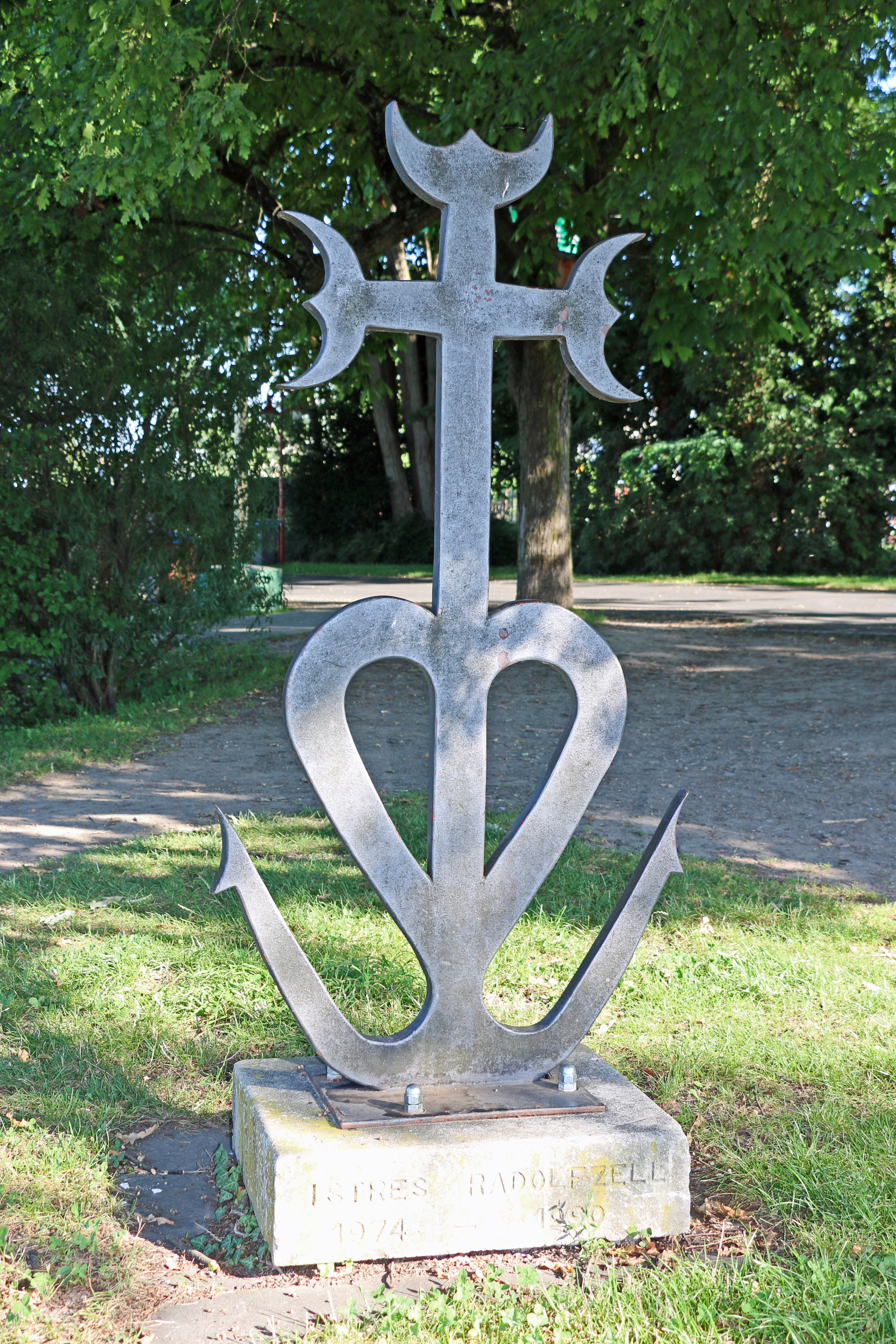
Radolfzell

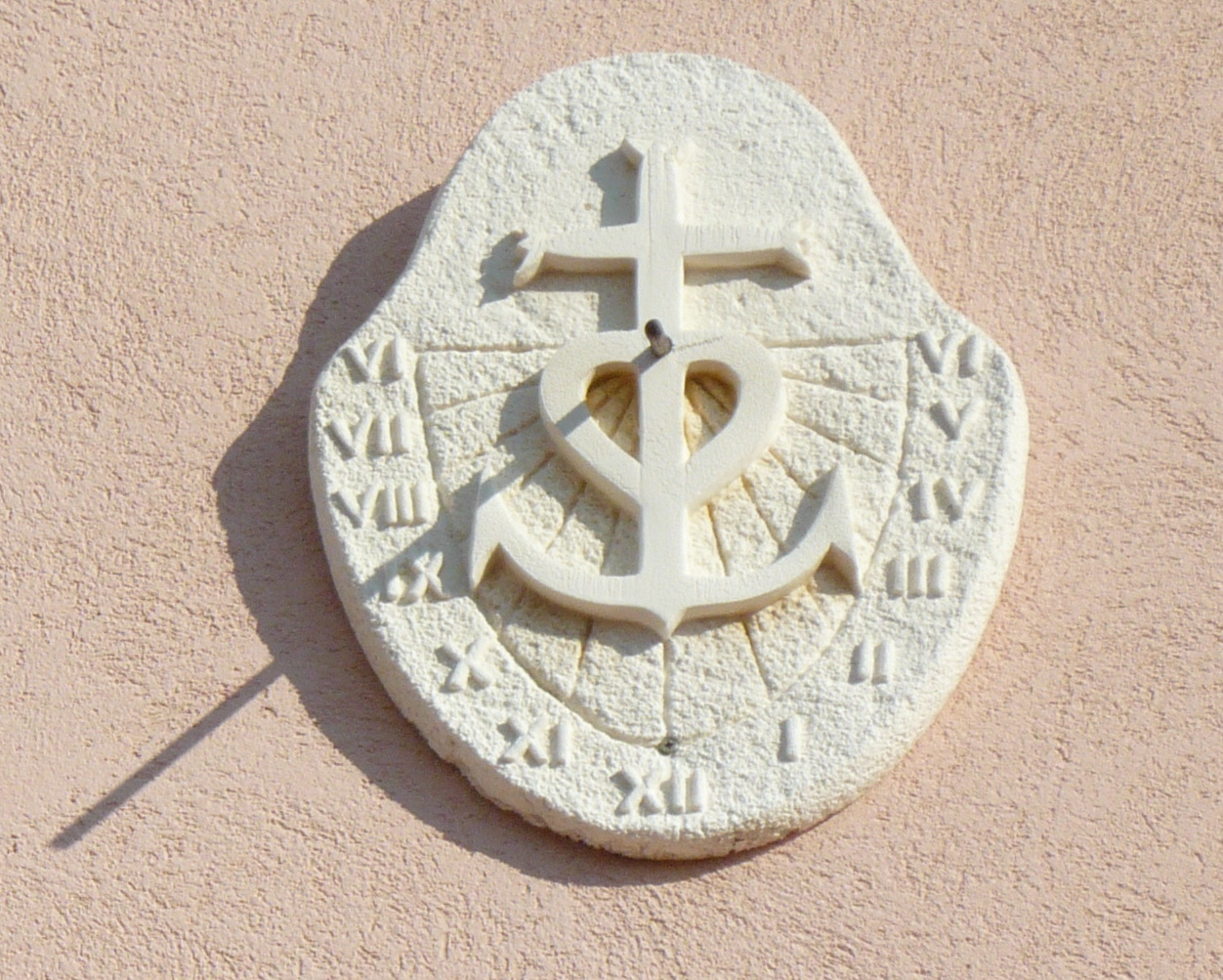
Sundial

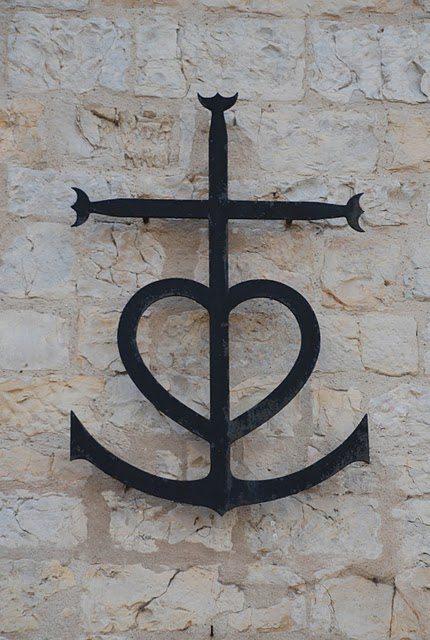
Church of the Saintes Maries de la Mer

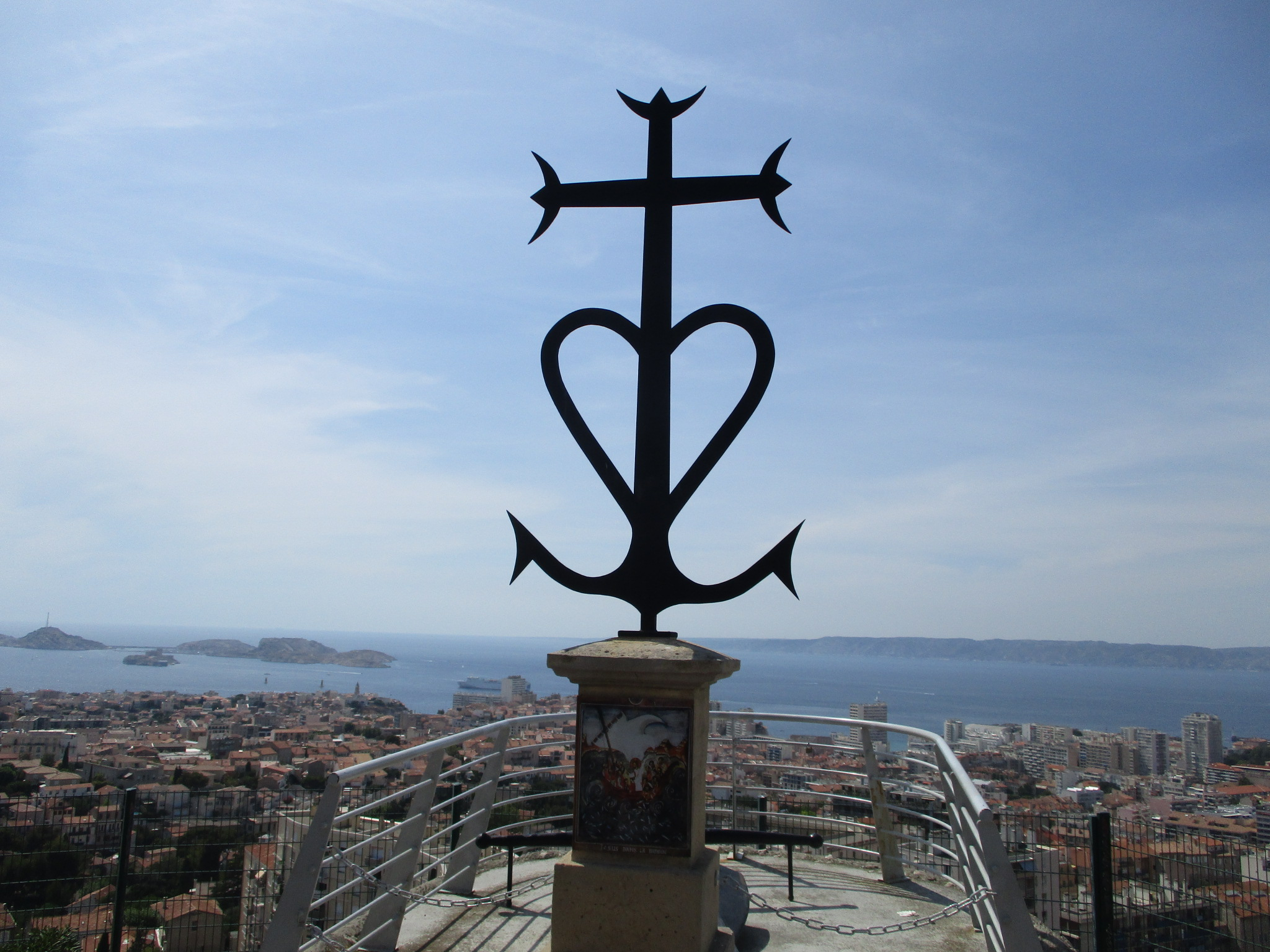
Square in front of the Notre-Dame de la Garde basilica in Marseille, facing the Mediterranean

Flag of Principality of Aigues-Mortes

== See also ==
- Anchored cross

== General bibliography ==
- Siméon, Jacky [in French] (2013). Dictionnaire de la course camarguaise (in French). p. 40. ISBN 978-2-84626-424-2.
- Blanchet, Philippe [in French]; Venture, Rémi; Turc, Jean-Michel (2016). La croix camarguaise (in French). Paris. ISBN 978-2-7540-8502-1.
