= Anchored cross =

Christian symbol: cross and anchor combined

Anchored cross

The anchored cross, or mariner's cross, is a stylized cross in the shape of an anchor. It is a symbol which is shaped like a plus sign depicted with anchor-like fluke protrusions at its base. There are many variations on this symbol, but the most common form connects a ring with a bar, with a cross-bar, terminating on the other end with two curved branches or arrowheads. The anchor symbolizes hope, steadfastness, calm and composure. It also can symbolize security in one or more uncertain experiences of life, such as sea voyages, one's fate after death, and the vagaries of fortune.

== Background ==
The anchor cross may be referred to as the "Cross of Hope," a concept dating back to (and perhaps before) Hebrews 6:19: "Which hope we have as an anchor of the soul, both sure and steadfast, and which entereth into that within the veil."

The use of the anchor as a symbol has been attributed to Seleucus I. The symbol was then adopted by the Jews living in the Seleucid Empire (around 300 BC) on their coinage. Therefore, the anchor as a symbol would have been widespread and familiar to early Christians. Inscriptions found in the catacomb of St. Domitilla dating back to the 1st century CE use the anchor as a symbol of faith. The anchor is thus one of the oldest symbols used in Christianity, and in this instance it is combined with the cross, representing Jesus. Clement of Alexandria is said to have approved the use of the anchor as a symbol because of its use in scripture. Hebrews 6.19 ties the anchor to the concept of "hope," and thus Christians' hope of salvation through Christ.

Missionaries of the United Methodist Church wear the anchor cross as a reminder that their work should always be "anchored in faith, hope and love".

The region of Camargue in France created their own symbol, made to represent the "Gardian Nation" of herdsmen and fishermen, and the three theological virtues of Christianity. It has the same elements as an anchored cross:

- a cross anchory with the three fleur-de-lis replaced by camargue tridents representing Christian faith;
- an anchor representing hope; along with
- the heart of The Three Marys representing charity

== St. Clement's Cross ==
The anchored cross is also referred to as the mariner's cross or St. Clement's Cross, in reference to the way he was supposedly martyred – tied to an anchor and thrown from a boat into the Black Sea. Despite this tradition of his untimely end at sea, Clement is considered a patron saint of sailors, and many wear his cross for protection.

== In heraldry ==
The anchored cross is a feature in coats of arms, and flags, in which context it is referred to by the heraldic terms "anchry" or "ancre." Examples of this are found in the hooked anchor that represents Vinnytsia, Ukraine; a three-leaf cross with an anchor on the coat of arms of Pyhäranta, Finland; a patriarchal cross with an anchor in the coat of arms of Barkakra Municipality, Sweden, and Wollmatingen, Germany; the coat of arms of León, Spain and Tallinn, Estonia; and the personal shield of Claude Feidt, the Archbishop of the Roman Catholic Archdiocese of Aix.

== Gallery ==
Variants of the anchored cross

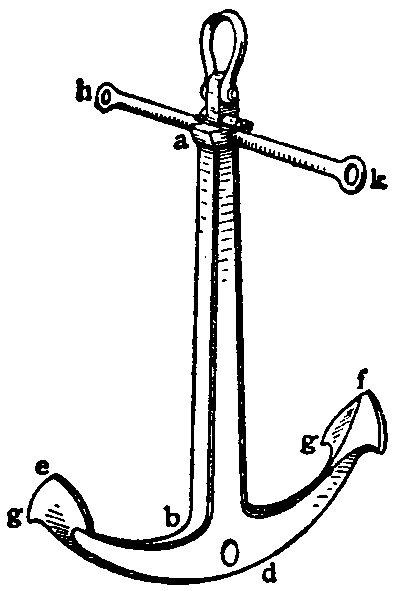
Admiralty Pattern anchor

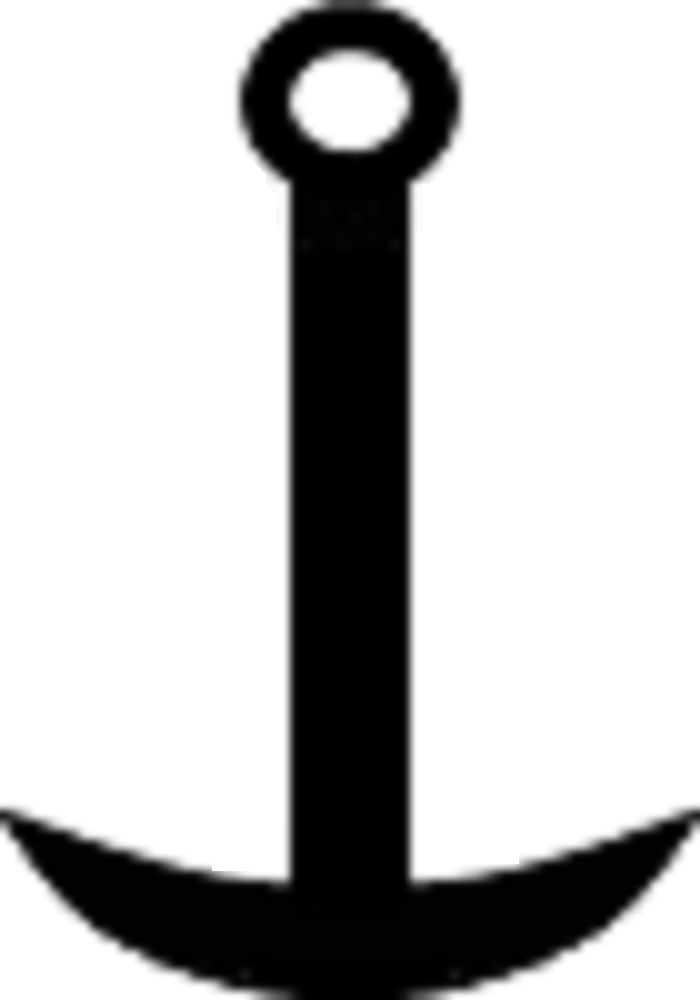
Stockless anchor cross

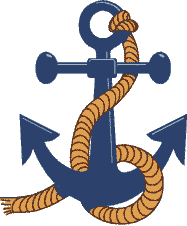
Anchor cross with rope

Anchor with wheel (wheel cross)

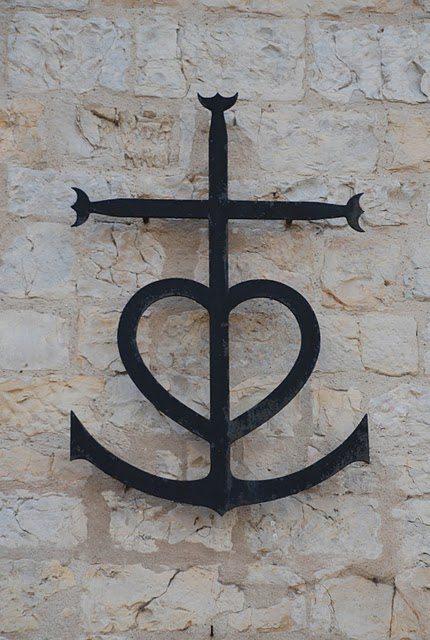
Camargue cross

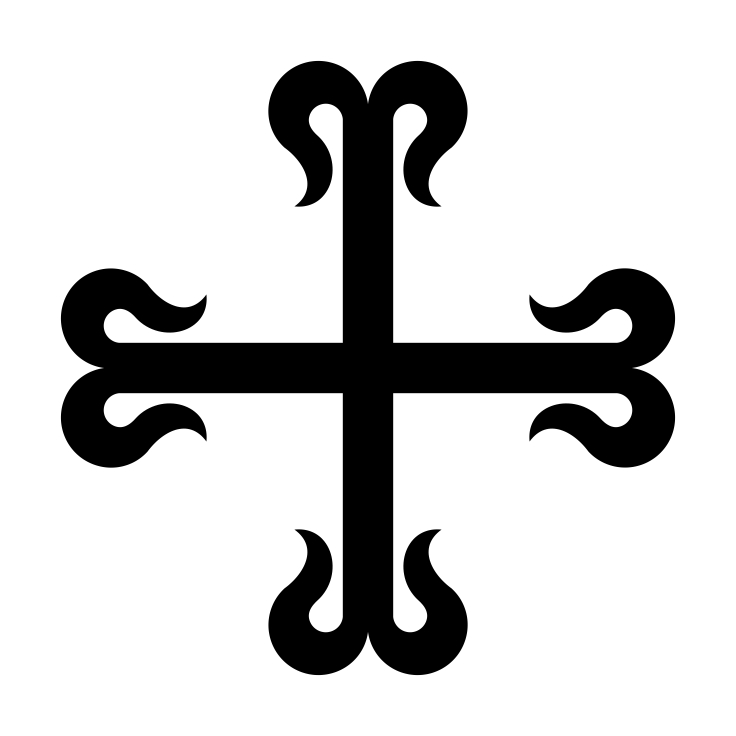
Cross anchory

St. Clement's Cross

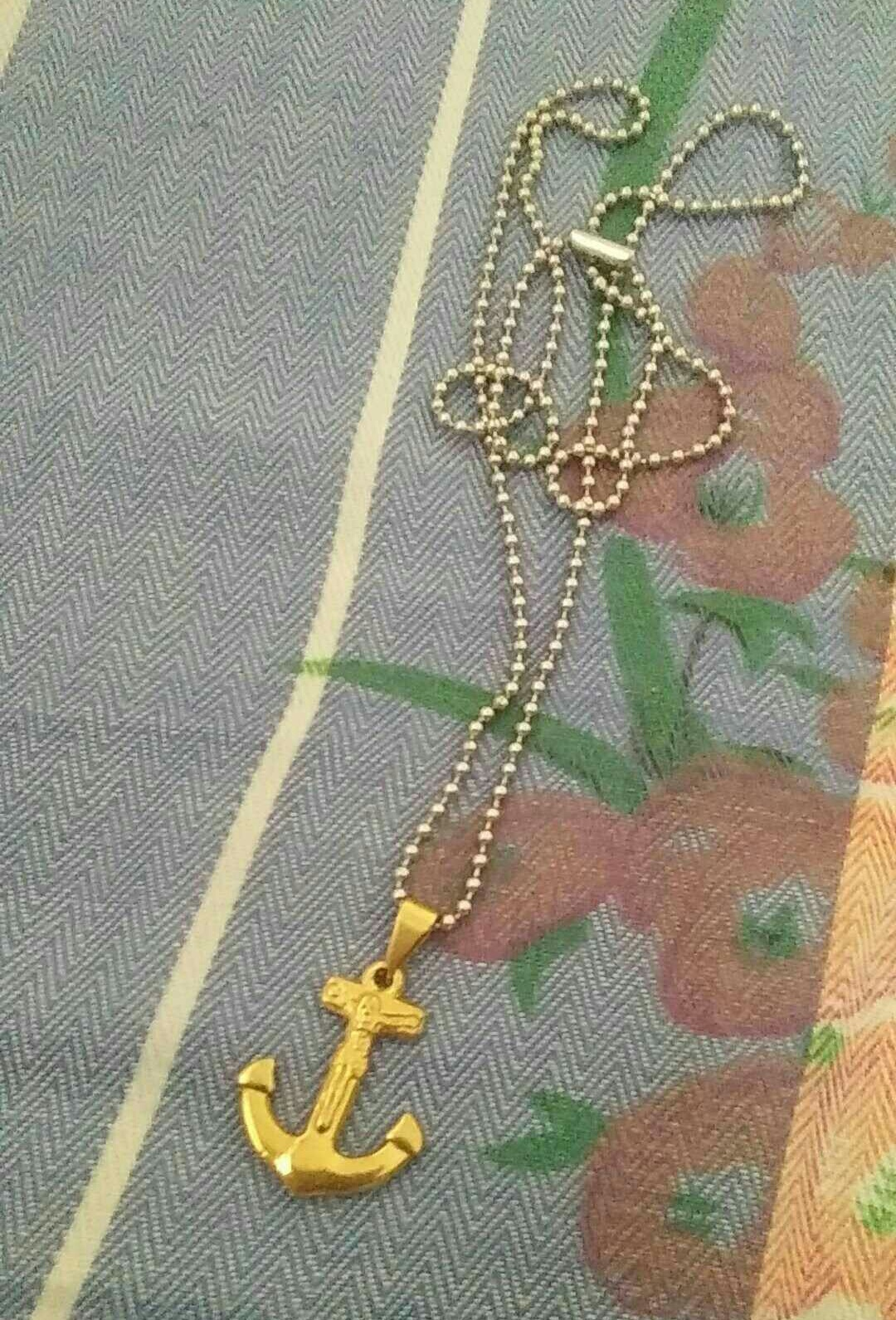
Anchored cross necklace
Anchored cross used in heraldry

Hooked anchor representing Vinnytsia

Red anchor cross

Cross bottony on an anchor on the coat of arms of Pyhäranta, Finland

Patriarch's Cross with an anchor in the coat of arms of Barkakra Municipality (Skåne County, Sweden)

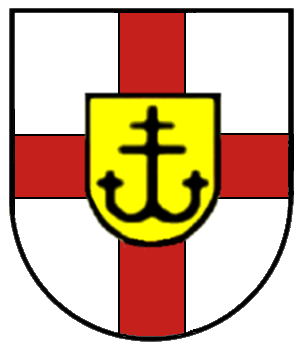
Anchor of the Patriarch's Cross in the coat of arms of Wollmatingen, Germany

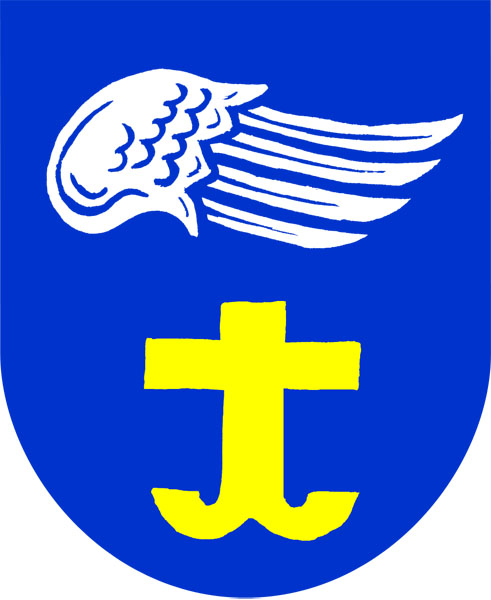
The coat of arms of the Czech city of Odolena Voda

León, Spain

Tallinn, Estonia

Szeliga

Claude Feidt Retired Archbishop of Aix-en-Provence

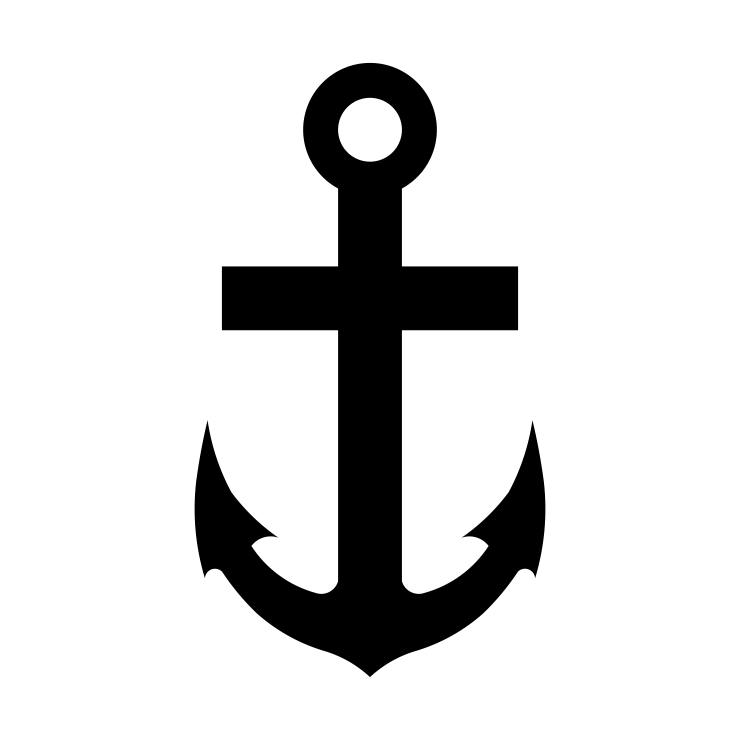
Anchor cross

== See also ==
- Crosses in heraldry
- Kotwica - Poland's anchor cross, used during the Second World War
