= Quarterdeck =

Raised deck behind the main mast of a sailing ship

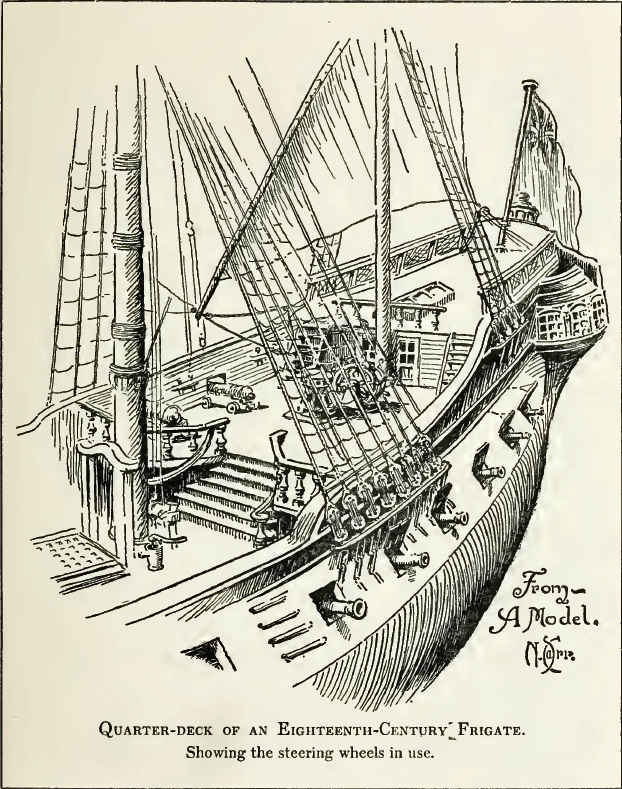
Raised quarterdeck of an 18th-century frigate, between the main mast and the even higher poop deck at the stern.

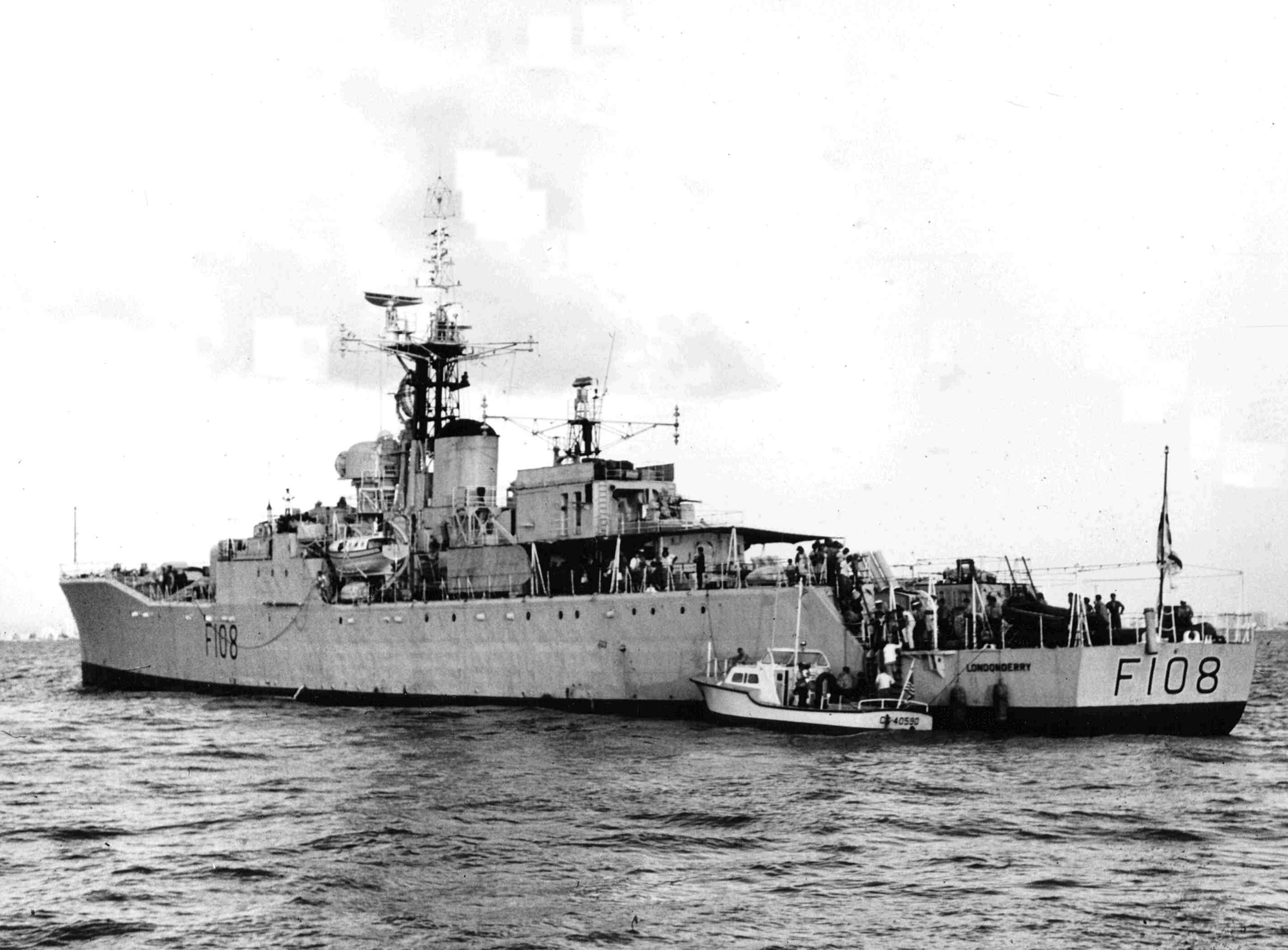
Before helicopter decks became common, warships such as the Rothesay class often had a deck at the stern used for secondary armament.

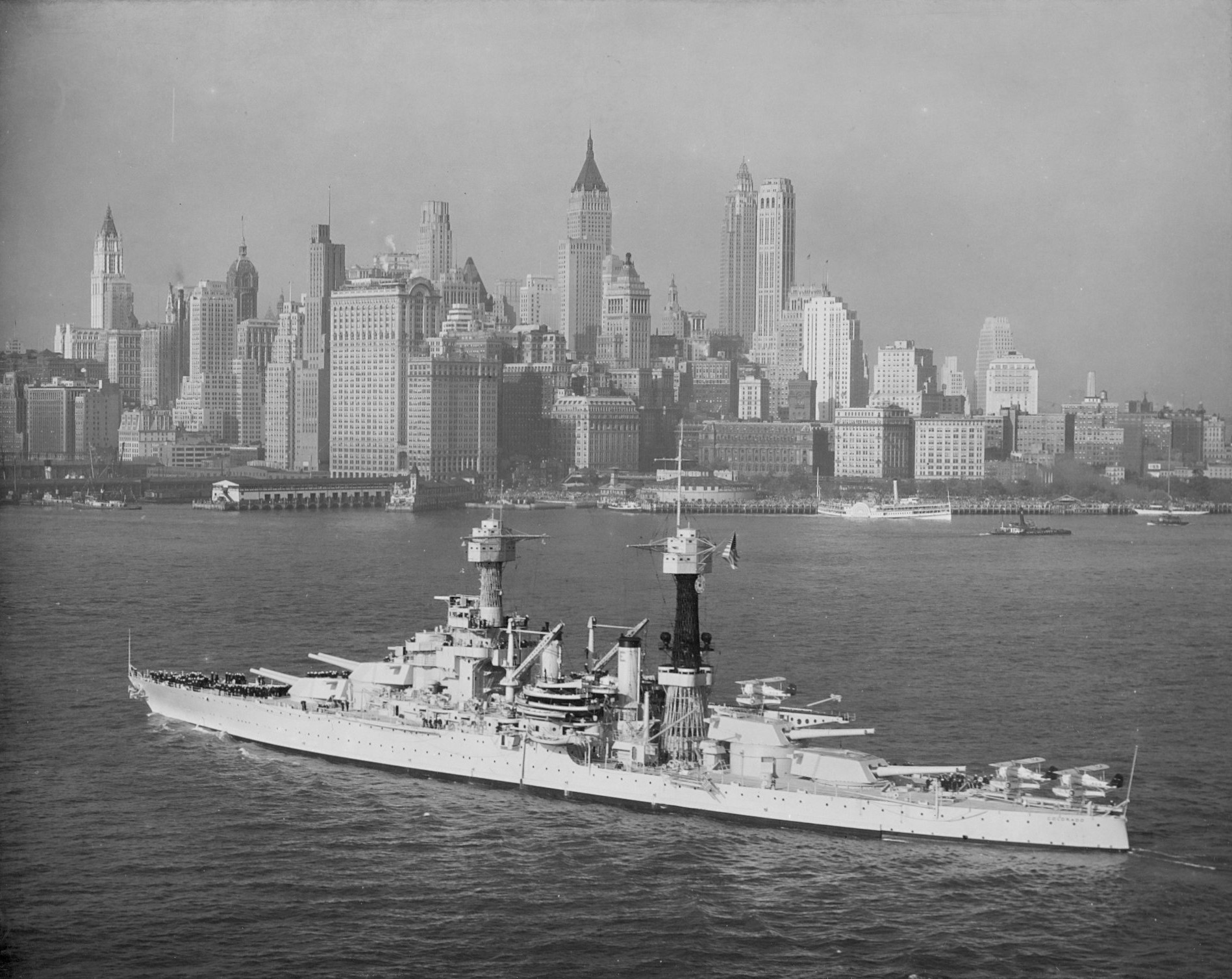
Seaplanes were often operated from the quarterdeck of battleships, as here on USS Colorado

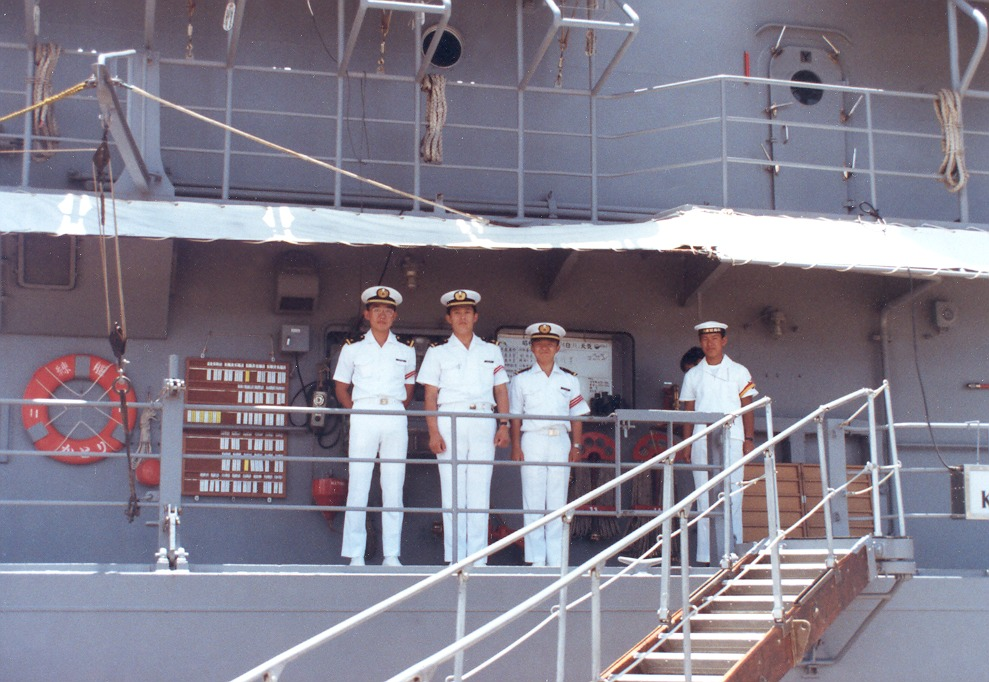
Quarterdeck of a Japanese warship. Note the watchstanders in uniform, the wooden plaque, and the proximity to the accommodation ladder.

The quarterdeck is a raised deck behind the main mast of a sailing ship. Traditionally it was where the captain commanded his vessel and where the ship's colours were kept. This led to its use as the main ceremonial and reception area on board, and the word is still used to refer to such an area on a ship or even in naval establishments on land. Many such facilities have areas decorated like shipboard quarterdecks.

In the 20th century the word came to be applied to the area at the stern of the ship, often (on naval vessels) used for secondary weapons and (on battleships) seaplane catapults.

== Ceremonial use ==
There are ancient traditions of offering special deference to the quarterdeck. Greek, Roman, and Carthaginian warships all carried shrines which were given special respect. This continued into Christian times, and in medieval British warships, the religious shrine was set up on the quarterdeck. All hands were required to salute it by taking off their hats or caps. This led to the habit of saluting whenever one entered the quarterdeck.

Today, quarterdeck refers not to a specific deck, but to a ceremonial area designated as such by the captain, often used as the ship's reception area while in harbour. As in the days of sail, it is a place where the captain has special control and prerogatives.

In port, the quarterdeck is the most important place on the ship, and is the central control point for all its major activities, as well as it is where the captain usually stands. Underway, its importance diminishes as control of the ship is transferred to the bridge. The quarterdeck is normally on the main deck, but may be elsewhere in some types of ship. It is usually marked off by special lines, deck markings, decorative cartridge cases, or fancy knotwork.

Special attention is paid to the quarterdeck's cleanliness and physical appearance. Those standing watch on the quarterdeck must be in the uniform of the day and present a smart appearance at all times. Personnel not in the uniform of the day generally avoid crossing the quarterdeck unless their work requires it. On ships with a well-defined quarterdeck area, uniformed personnel should salute when they enter it. Smoking and recreational activities are prohibited on the quarterdeck unless specially authorised by the commanding officer.

The starboard gangway to the quarterdeck is normally used by officers and their visitors; the port gangway is used by everyone else. In bad weather, all personnel use the lee gangway. On smaller ships with only one gangway, it may be rigged to either side and is used by everyone. Flagships sometimes have an additional starboard gangway for the flag officer and officers of his staff.

== History ==
In medieval times, warships had a single deck, with raised structures at each end: the "forecastle" in the front, and the "aftercastle" in the rear. Following the introduction of cannon, the aftercastle was gradually replaced with a simpler structure consisting of the halfdeck above the main deck, extending forwards from the stern to the mainmast; and above that the quarterdeck, extending about half as far forwards. Later the halfdeck was extended the entire length of the ship, becoming the main deck (the former main deck now being the gun deck), leaving the quarterdeck as the only significant deck above the main deck.

The captain or master commanded the ship from the quarterdeck. The quarterdeck was traditionally the place where the captain walked when on deck, usually on the windward side. The navigator also used it when taking his sights when fixing the vessel's position. On most ships, it was customary that only officers could use the quarterdeck, others being allowed there only when assigned for specific duties. By extension, on flush-decked ships the after part of the main deck, where the officers took their station, was also known as the quarterdeck.

== Scouting ==
In Sea Scouts a Quarterdeck is described as a group of foremost youth officers in a ship, summarily the same model is applied to form Quarterdecks on the Council & National Level.

Quarterdeck trainings are also often carried out by Sea Scout Ships to equip leaders to be able to effectively organize the unit.

== See also ==
- Deck (ship)
- Sailors' superstitions
