= Claude Feidt =

French bishop (1936–2020)

His Excellency The Most Reverend Claude Feidt
- Archbishop Emeritus of Aix
- Church: Roman Catholic Church
- Appointed: 17 June 1999
- Term ended: 29 March 2010
- Predecessor: Louis-Marie Billé
- Successor: Christophe Dufour

Orders
- Ordination: 24 December 1961 by Jean-Pierre Dozolme
- Consecration: 13 September 1980 by André Bontems

Personal details
- Born: 7 March 1936 Audun-le-Roman, Meurthe-et-Moselle, French Third Republic
- Died: 13 October 2020 (aged 84) Le Puy-en-Velay, Auvergne-Rhône-Alpes, France
- Coat of arms

Claude Feidt (7 March 1936 – 13 October 2020) was a French Roman Catholic archbishop.

Feidt was born in France and was ordained to the priesthood in 1961. He served as auxiliary bishop, coadjutor archbishop and archbishop of the Roman Catholic Archdiocese of Chambéry, France from 1980 to 1999 and as archbishop of the Roman Catholic Archdiocese of Aix from 1999 to 2010.
