= Sailors' superstitions =

List of superstitions particular to sailors and boating

Sailors' superstitions are superstitions particular to sailors or mariners, and which traditionally have been common around the world. Some of these beliefs are popular superstitions, while others are better described as traditions, stories, folklore, tropes, myths, or legends. The origins of many of these superstitions are based in the inherent risks of sailing, and luck, either good or bad, as well as portents and omens that would be given associative meaning in relation to the life of a mariner, sailor, fisherman, or crew in general. Even in the 21st century, "fishers and related fishing workers" in the U.S. have the second-most dangerous occupation, trailing only loggers.

== Bad luck ==
By far the best known sailors' superstitions involve bad luck.

=== Red sunrise ===
Sailors are taught if the sunrise is red to take warning. The day ahead will be dangerous. "Red Sky at night, Sailors delight; Red Sky in the morning, Sailors take warning." It may also be said as; "Red at morning, Sailor's warning; Red at night, Sailor's delight," or "Red sky at night, Sailor's delight; Red sky at morn, Sailor be warned."

This saying actually has some scientific validity, although it assumes storm systems will approach from the west, and is therefore generally correct only at mid-latitudes where, due to the rotation of the Earth, prevailing winds travel west to east. If the morning skies are red, it is because clear skies over the horizon to the east permit the sun to light the undersides of moisture-bearing clouds.

Conversely, to see red clouds in the evening, sunlight must have a clear path from the west, so therefore the prevailing westerly wind must be bringing clear skies. Basically, this means if there is a red sky, Sun, or clouds at morning, it might mean there will be a storm, or severe winds will come. Although, if there is a red sky, Sun, or clouds at night, there will be clear skies, soft or no winds, and you have a good day ahead of you.

=== Jonah ===
A "Jonah" is a long-established expression among sailors, meaning a person (either a sailor or a passenger) who is bad luck, which is based on the Biblical prophet Jonah. Clergymen are considered bad luck, as they are all of Jonah's ilk. Redheads and women are also to be avoided as passengers.

=== Unlucky days ===
Friday is considered to be an unlucky day in some cultures, and perhaps the most enduring sailing superstition is that it is unlucky to begin a voyage or "set sail" on a Friday. However, this superstition is not universal. In the 19th century Admiral William Henry Smyth, writing in his nautical lexicon The Sailor's Word-Book, described Friday as

The Dies Infaustus, on which old seamen were desirous of not getting under weigh, as ill-omened.

(Dies Infaustus means "unlucky day".) This superstition is the root of the well-known urban legend of HMS Friday.

Sailors are often reluctant to set sail on Candlemas Day, believing that any voyage begun then will end in disaster. This may be related to the superstition to remove all Christmas decorations by Candlemas, a practice done well into Victorian times.

In 18th century New England, rolling clouds and roaring waves were thought as bad omens, so sailing on days under such conditions was considered inadvisable.

In The Old Man and the Sea, the protagonist and "unlucky" sailor Santiago sails on a Friday.

=== Sirens and Scylla ===
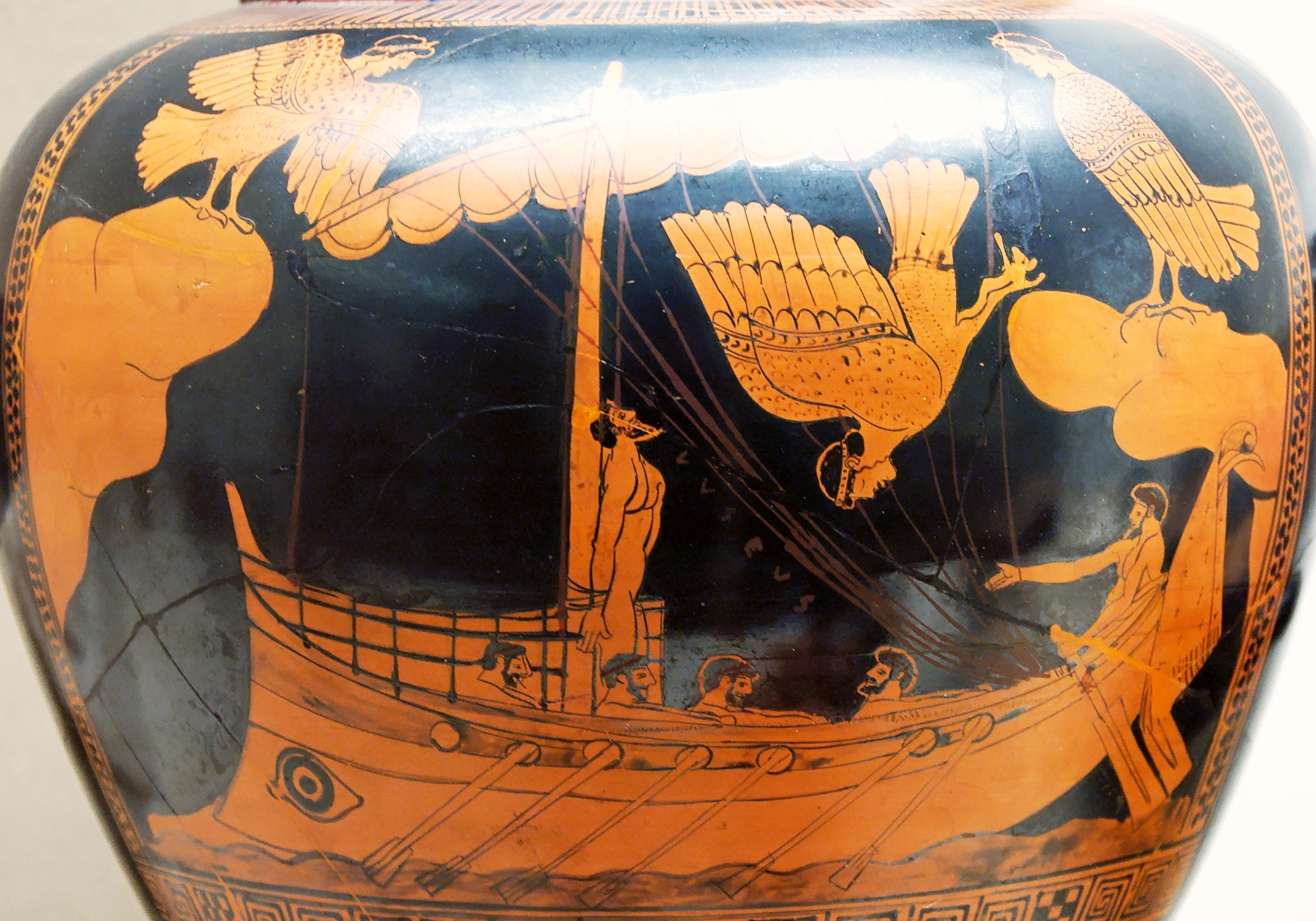
Odysseus and the Sirens, eponymous vase of the Siren Painter, ca. 480-470 BC, (British Museum)

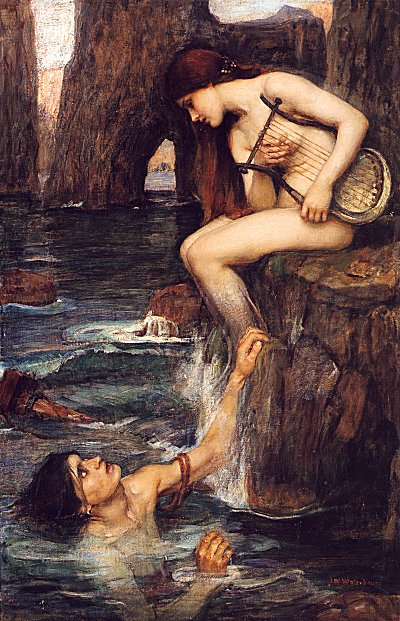
The Siren, by John William Waterhouse (circa 1900), depicted as a fish-chimera.

Sirens were mythological, often dangerous and beautiful, creatures, portrayed as femmes fatales who lured nearby sailors with their enchanting music and voices to shipwreck on the rocky coast of their island. They were portrayed in both Greek and Roman mythology as sea deities who lured mariners, and in Roman lore were daughters of Phorcys. In the Odyssey, the hero Odysseus, wishing to hear the sirens' seductive and destructive song, must protect himself and his crew by having his fellow sailors tie him to the mast and then stop their own ears with wax (see image).

In another myth, Hera, queen of the gods, persuaded the Sirens to enter a singing contest with the Muses, which the Sirens lost; out of their anguish, writes Stephanus of Byzantium, the Sirens turned white and fell into the sea at Aptera ("featherless"), where they formed the islands in the bay that were called Souda (modern Lefkai).

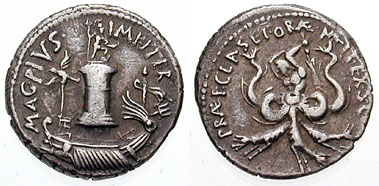
Scylla on the reverse of a first century B.C. denarius minted by Sextus Pompeius

Another mythological creature, the Scylla, is a similar female sea demon that is both dangerous yet beautiful. Sirens supposedly "lured mariners to their deaths with their melodious, enchanting song", while "Scylla sent countless sailors to the depths of the sea."

On a related note, it was considered bad luck to have women on board, due to the potential for distractions which in turn would anger the sea gods and cause bad weather.

=== Albatross ===
The albatross as a superstitious relic is referenced in Samuel Taylor Coleridge's well-known 1798 poem The Rime of the Ancient Mariner. It is considered very unlucky to kill an albatross; in Coleridge's poem, the narrator killed the bird and his fellow sailors eventually force him to wear the dead bird around his neck. It is considered good luck for a sailor to see an albatross and let it live.

=== Bananas ===
Having bananas on a ship, especially on a private boat or fishing yacht, is considered bad luck. The origin of the superstition is unknown. Some believe it originates from the bananas causing other fruits and vegetables to ripen too quickly.

=== Ceremonial ship launching ===
During the christening ceremony for a ship, it is considered bad luck if the bottle swung against the side of the ship fails to break.

=== Unlucky numbers ===
In North America and Western Europe, 13 is considered unlucky, so cruise ships are sometimes built without a deck 13.

In Italy, where 17 is considered unlucky, cruise ships built and operated by MSC Cruises lack a Deck 17.

=== Naming of a ship ===
A new boat or ship needs to be named with a proper christening ceremony and breaking a bottle of champagne or other sparkling wine.

The re-naming of a ship is not to be taken lightly: it is 7 years' bad luck to re-name a ship, without going through the proper procedures. The steps involved include:

1. Remove all traces of the current name.
2. Begin the purging ceremony.
3. Begin the renaming ceremony.
4. Appease the four wind gods.

Finally, re-christen the ship with a bottle of champagne, drinking any remaining.

== Good luck ==
Sailors also had a culture of items or practices that were believed to bring good luck, or trinkets to ward off bad luck or the "evil eye".

=== Cats ===
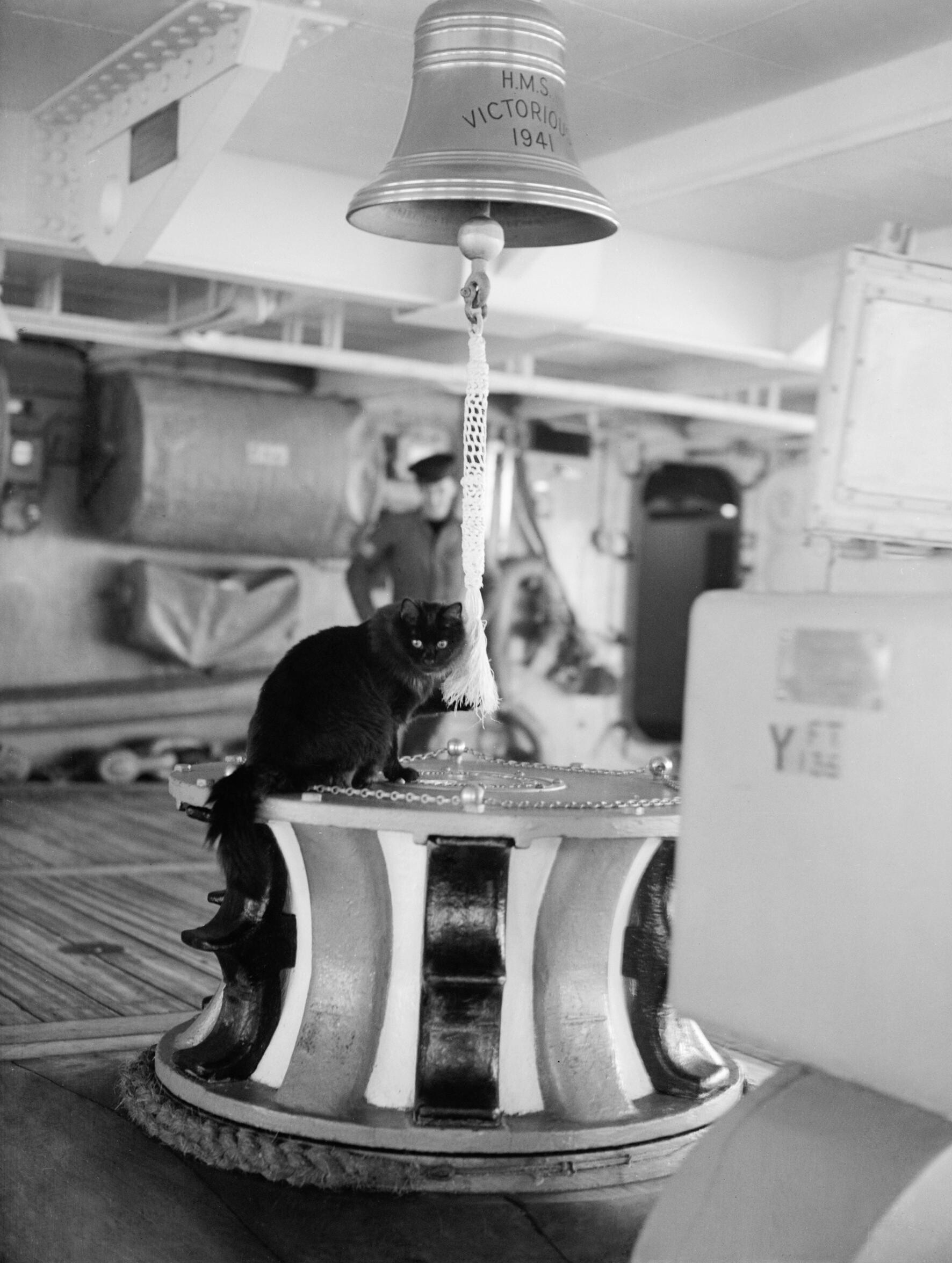
Tiddles, a black cat who gained fame as a Royal Navy ship's cat

While in many cultures, a black cat is considered unlucky, British and Irish sailors considered it good luck to adopt a black "ship's cat". A high level of care was directed toward them to keep them happy. There is some logic to this belief: cats hunt rodents, which can damage ropes and stores of grain on board, as well as spread disease among passengers and crew. Research has backed up this superstition. Evidence published in 2017 by a geneticist the University of Leuven shows that Egyptian cats spread their mitochondrial DNA through shipping lanes to medieval northern Europe. Preliminary results of that genetic study concluded that cats were also carried on trading ships to control rodents, and that practice was adopted by traders from other nations, including Vikings in northern Germany around the 8th to 11th centuries.

Some sailors believed that polydactyl cats were better at catching pests, possibly connected with the suggestion that extra digits give a polydactyl cat better balance, important when at sea. Cats were believed to have miraculous powers that could protect ships from dangerous weather. Another popular belief was that cats could start storms through magic stored in their tails. If a ship's cat fell or was thrown overboard, it was thought that it would summon a terrible storm to sink the ship and that if the ship was able to survive, it would be cursed with nine years of bad luck. Other beliefs included: if a cat licked its fur against the grain, it meant a hailstorm was coming; if it sneezed it meant rain; and if it was frisky it meant wind.

=== Cormorants ===
Cormorants, in some Scandinavian areas, are considered a good omen; in particular, in Norwegian tradition spirits of those lost at sea come to visit their loved ones disguised as cormorants.

=== Whistling ===
Whistling on board a sailing ship is thought to encourage the wind strength to increase. This is regularly alluded to in the Aubrey–Maturin books by Patrick O'Brian.

On boats and ships whistling was taboo as it was associated with coded communications between mutineers. The cook was usually excused, because as long as he was whistling, he was not stealing the food.

=== Klabautermann ===
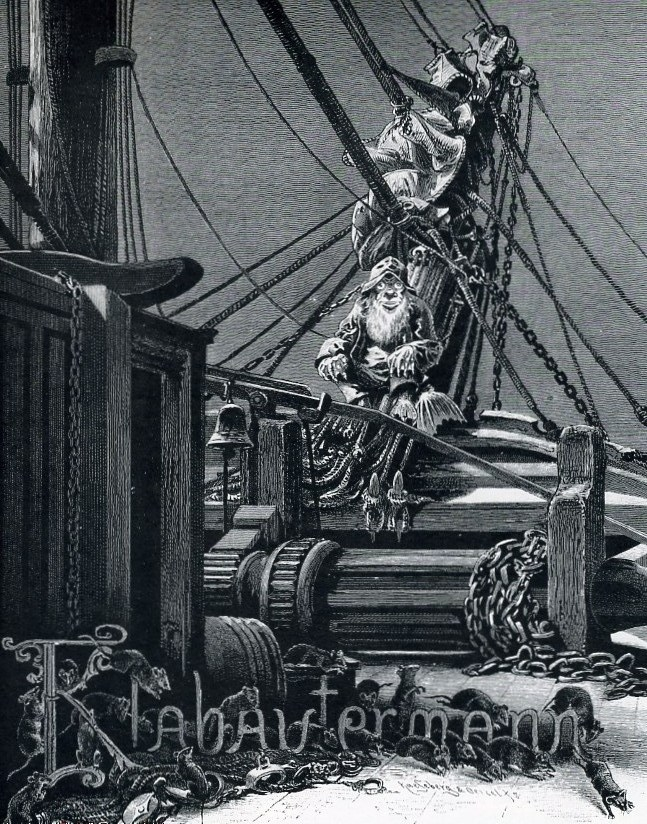
A Klabautermann on a ship, from Buch Zur See, 1885

Traditionally, a type of kobold or mythical sprite, called a Klabautermann, lives aboard ships and helps sailors and fishermen on the Baltic and North Sea in their duties. He is a merry and diligent creature, with an expert understanding of most watercraft, and an irrepressible musical talent. He also rescues sailors washed overboard. The name comes from the Low German verb klabastern meaning "rumble" or "make a noise". An etymology deriving the name from the verb kalfatern ("to caulk") has also been suggested. A carved klabautermann image, of a small sailor dressed in yellow with a tobacco pipe and woollen sailor's cap, often carrying a caulking hammer, is attached to the mast as a symbol of good luck. However, despite the positive attributes, there is one omen associated with his presence: no member of a ship blessed by his presence shall ever set eyes on him; he only ever becomes visible to the crew of a doomed ship. The belief in Klabautermänner dates to at least the 1770s.

=== Patron saints ===
Patron saints
St. Clement's Cross

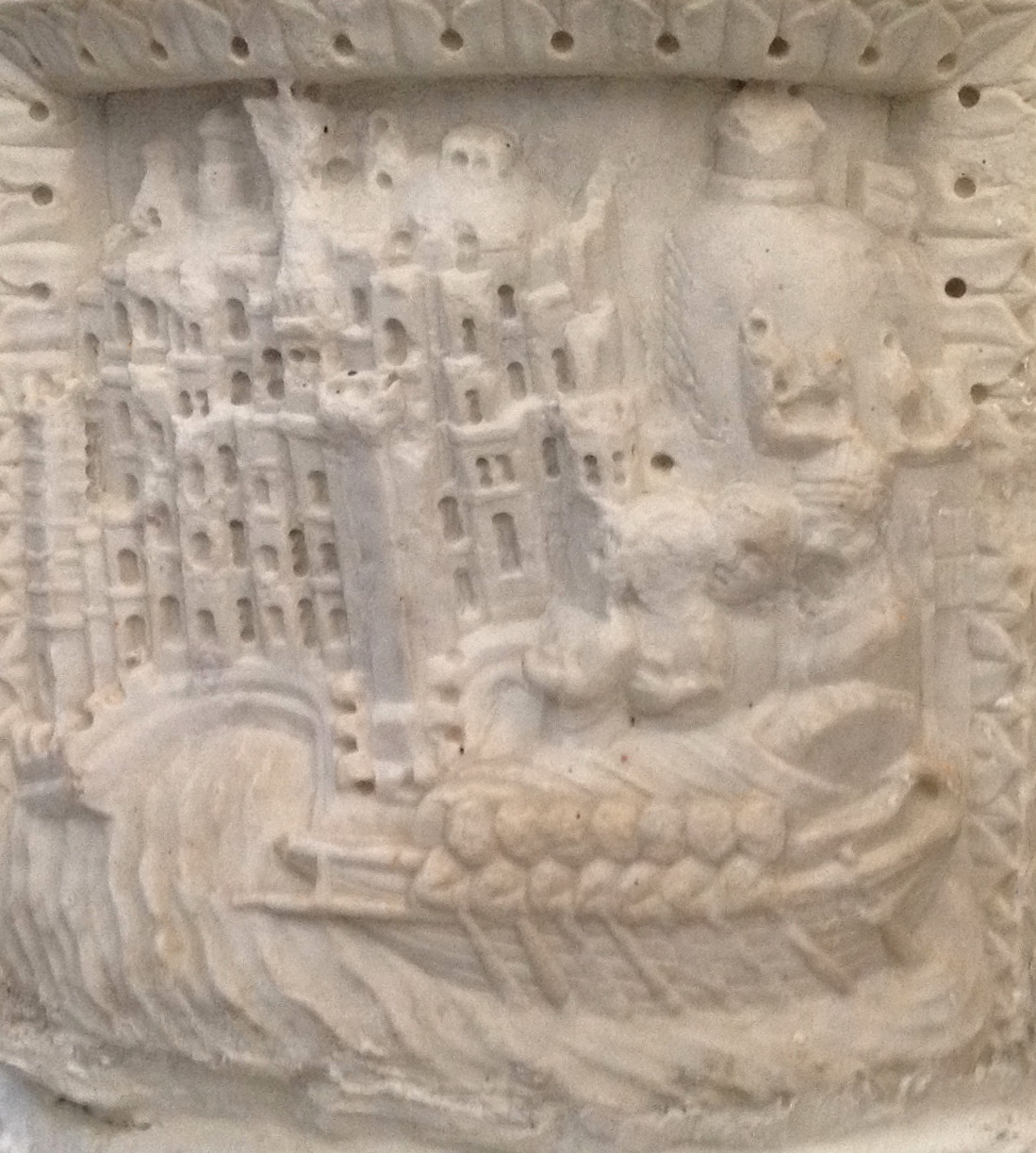
Saint Elmo

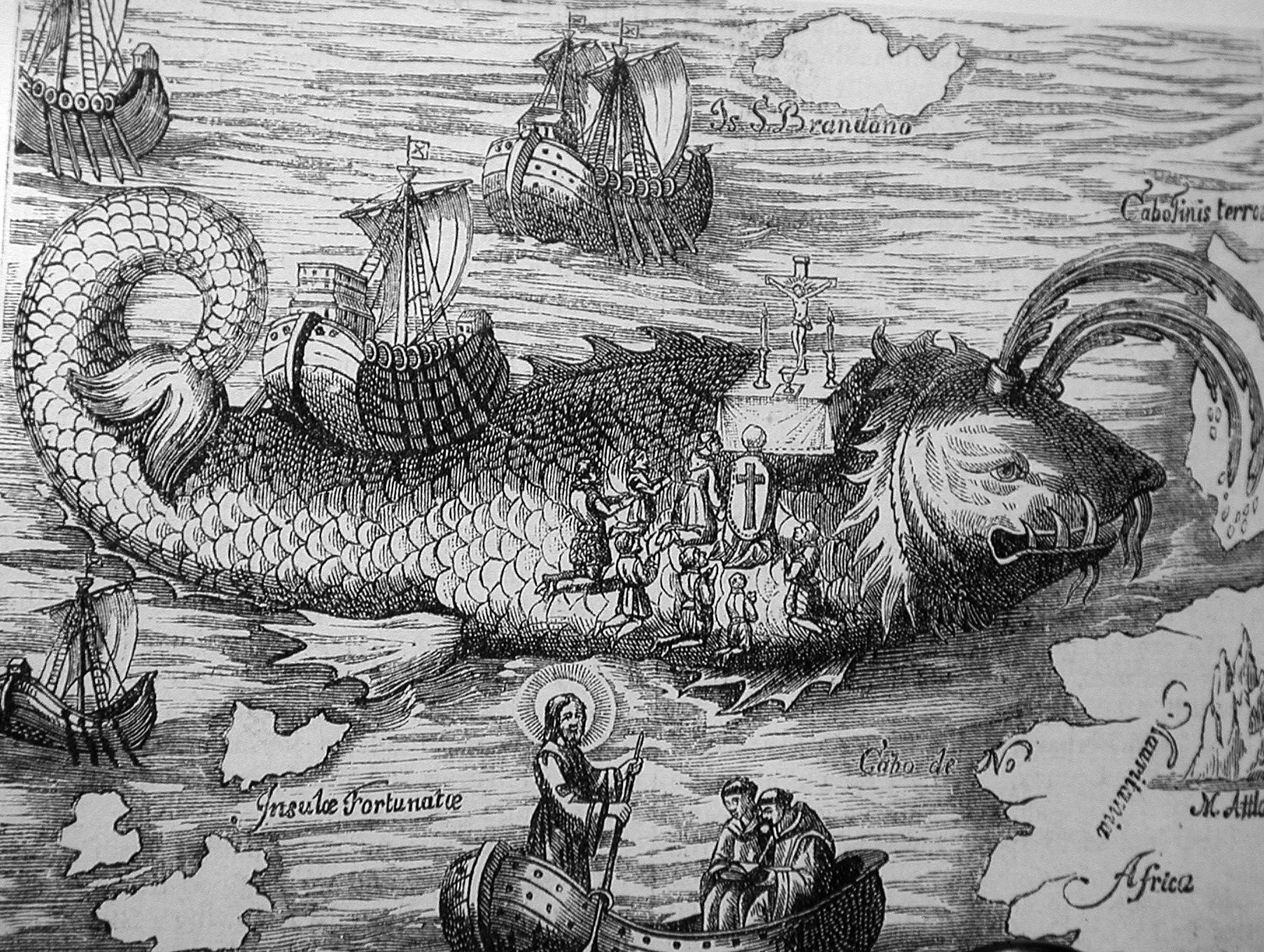
St. Brendan's Island

Sailors have had several patron saints. According to his hagiography, Saint Nicholas calmed a storm by prayer. Brendan the Navigator is also considered a patron saint of sailors and navigators, due to his mythical voyage to St. Brendan's Island. Erasmus of Formiae, also known as Saint Elmo, may have become the patron of sailors because he is said to have continued preaching even after a thunderbolt struck the ground beside him. This prompted sailors, who were in danger from sudden storms and lightning, to claim his prayers. The electrical discharges at the mastheads of ships were read as a sign of his protection and came to be called "Saint Elmo's Fire". Thus, Saint Elmo's Fire was usually good luck in traditional sailor's lore, but because it is a sign of electricity in the air and interferes with compass readings, sailors sometimes regarded it as an omen of bad luck and stormy weather. The mariner's cross, also referred to as St. Clement's Cross, is worn by many sailors to bring blessings.

=== Good luck deities ===
There are many deities associated with protection of sailors and good luck for them.

For example, a sculpture of "Tian Hou (or Mazu), queen of heaven and protector of seafarers", is held at the Yueh Hai Ching temple on Philip Street, off of the Singapore River in Singapore.

=== Lucky actions ===
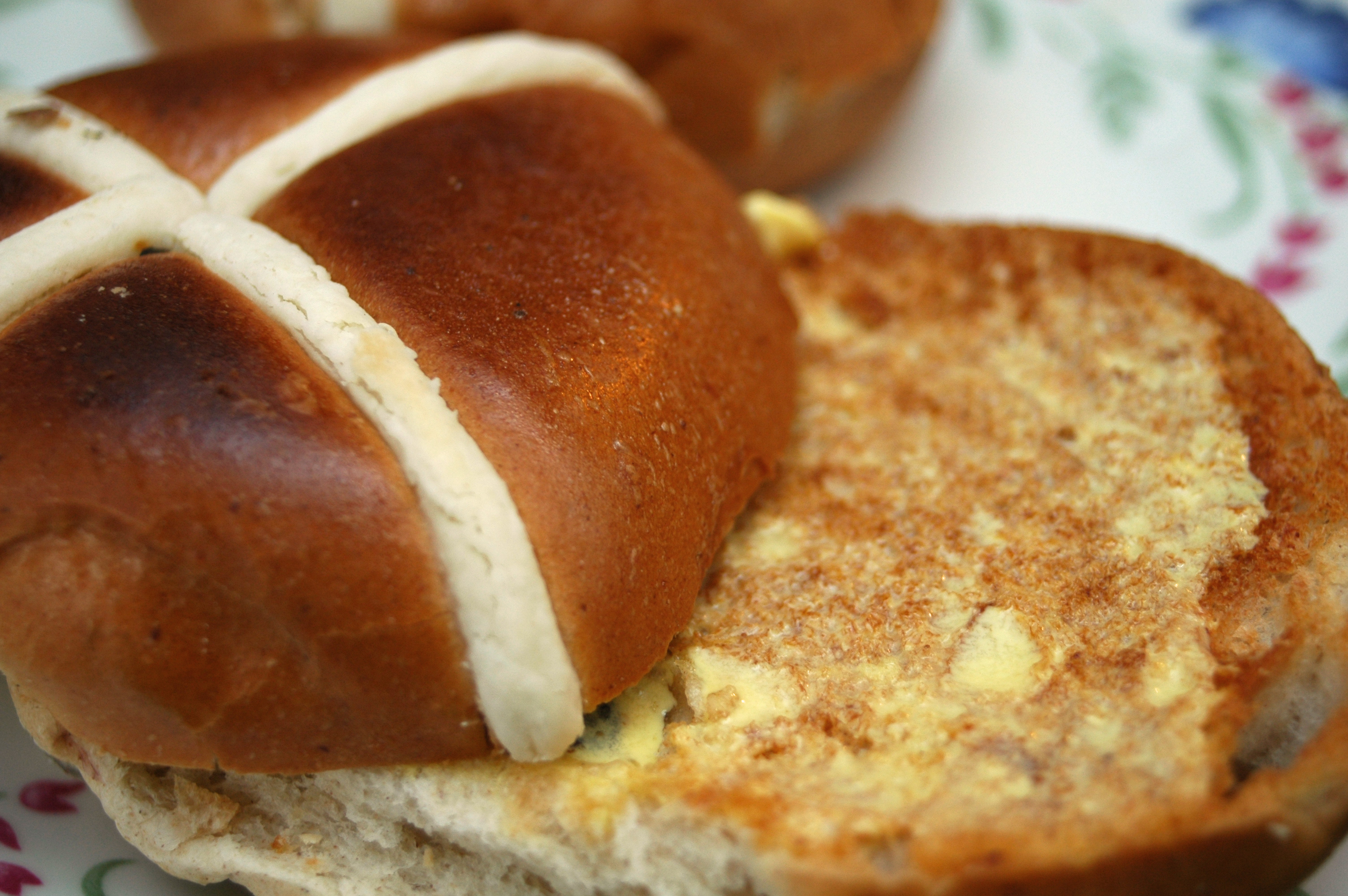
Hot cross bun, with a piped cross made from flour paste, cut in two and toasted

English folklore includes many superstitions surrounding hot cross buns. If taken on a sea voyage, hot cross buns are said to protect against shipwreck. If hung in the galley, they are said to protect against fire and ensure that all breads turn out perfectly. The hanging bun is replaced each year.

It is often considered lucky to touch the collar of a sailor's suit.

Folklore developed suggesting that possession of a baby's caul would bring its bearer good luck and protect that person from death by drowning. Cauls were therefore highly prized by sailors. Medieval women often sold them to sailors for large sums of money; a caul was regarded as a valuable talisman.

According to Pliny the Elder, if a woman was on a ship, and she stripped herself naked, she could lull a storm at sea.

=== Mermaids and mermen ===
Mermaids usually are considered lucky, but not universally. In Trinidad and Tobago, sea-dwelling mer-men "were known to grant a wish, transform mediocrity into genius and confer wealth and power."

Mermaids appear in British folklore as unlucky omens, both foretelling disaster and provoking it. Several variants of the ballad Sir Patrick Spens depict a mermaid speaking to the doomed ships. In some versions, she tells them they will never see land again; in others, she claims they are near shore, which they are wise enough to know means the same thing. Mermaids can also be a sign of approaching rough weather, and some have been described as monstrous in size, up to 2,000 feet (610 m).

The Little Mermaid statue in Copenhagen, Denmark

Hans Christian Andersen's fairy tale "The Little Mermaid" was published in 1837. The story was adapted into a Disney film. In the original version, The Little Mermaid is the youngest daughter of a sea king who lives at the bottom of the sea. To pursue a prince with whom she has fallen in love, the mermaid gets a sea witch to give her legs and agrees to give up her tongue in return. Though she is found on the beach by the prince, he marries another. Told she must stab the prince in the heart to return to her sisters, she can't do it out of love for him. She then rises from the ocean and sees ethereal beings around her who explain that mermaids who do good deeds become daughters of the air, and after 300 years of good service they can earn a human soul. A world-famous statue of the Little Mermaid, based on Andersen's fairy tale, has been in Copenhagen, Denmark since August 1913, with copies in 13 other locations around the world.

Sailors would look for mermaid's purses on beaches for signs of mermaids in the area.

== Lore, mythology, and stories ==
=== Kraken ===
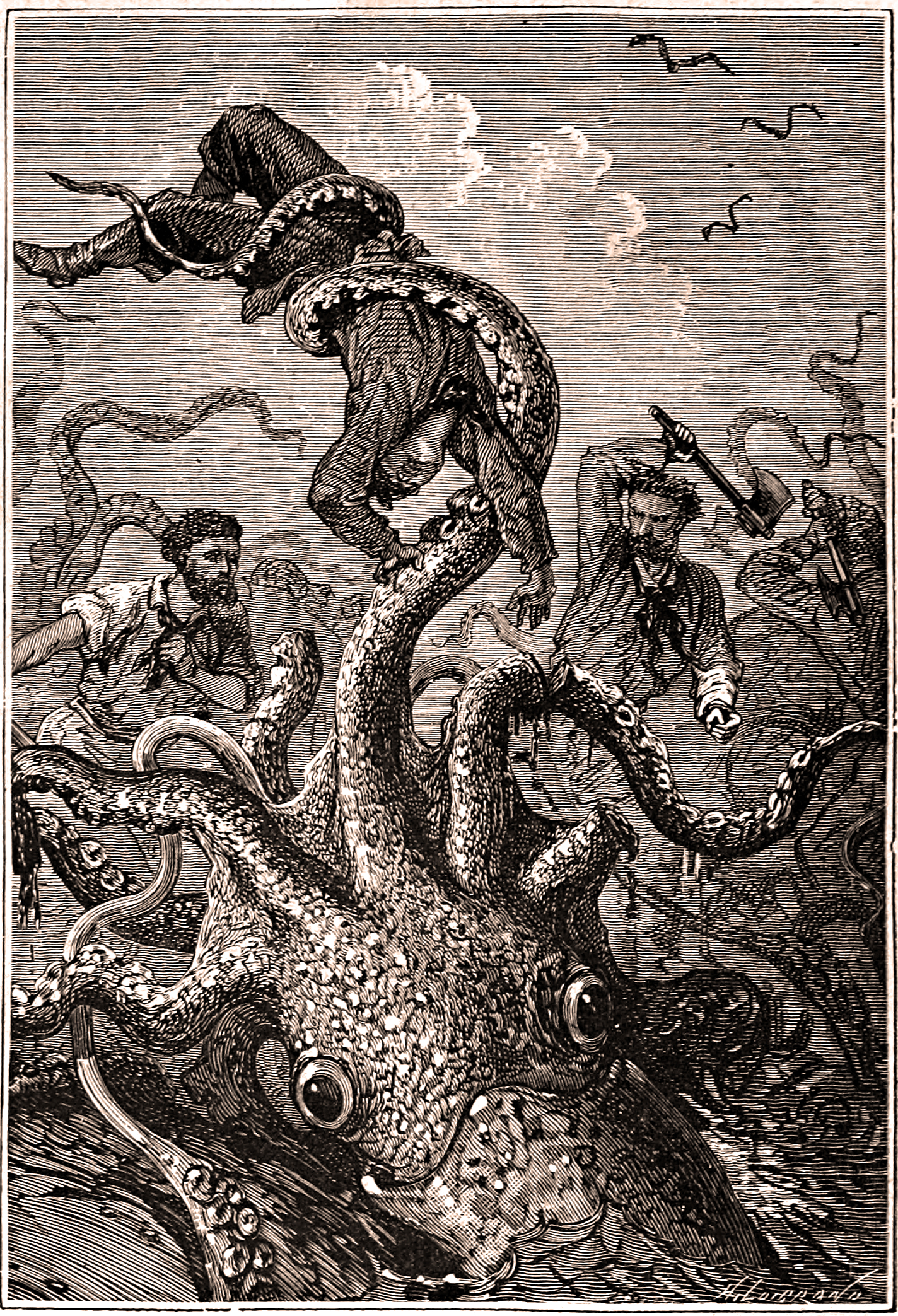
An illustration from the original 1870 edition of Twenty Thousand Leagues Under the Seas by author Jules Verne.

Davy Jones is a popular character in sailor's lore, especially of the gothic fictional variety. Davy Jones' Locker is an idiom for the bottom of the sea: the state of death among drowned sailors. It is used as a euphemism for death or burial at sea (to be sent to Davy Jones' Locker). The origins of the name are unclear, and many theories have been put forth, including an actual David Jones, who was a pirate on the Indian Ocean in the 1630s; a pub owner who kidnapped sailors and then dumped them onto any passing ship; the incompetent Duffer Jones, a notoriously myopic sailor who often found himself over-board; or that Davy Jones is another name for Satan; or "Devil Jonah", the biblical Jonah who became the "evil angel" of all sailors, who would identify more with the beset-upon ship-mates of Jonah than with the unfortunate man himself. Upon death, a wicked sailor's body supposedly went to Davy Jones' locker (a chest, as lockers were back then), but a pious sailor's soul went to Fiddler's Green. This nautical superstition was popularized in the 19th century.

Kraken were legendary sea monsters that may have been based on sightings of giant squids.

=== Finns and wind ===
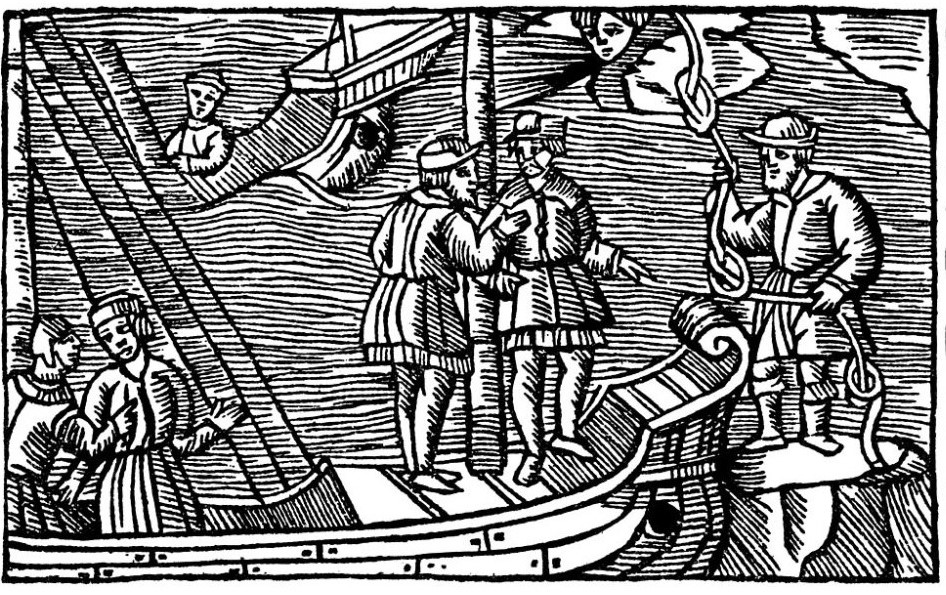
A Finnish wizard selling wind.

In the early 1800s, some sailors believed that Finns could control the wind. Finnish wizards were known to make wind, and they sold ropes with knots: open one knot, it would cause mild wind; open the second, strong winds would blow; open the third, and "a full gale wind" could crash upon the ship.

== Practices and semiotics ==
In relation to language and cultural practices, such sailors' superstitions are the consequence of folkloric practices or traditions whose meanings were once important signifiers, but now are lost to most modern sailors and laypersons alike.

=== Sailor tattoos ===
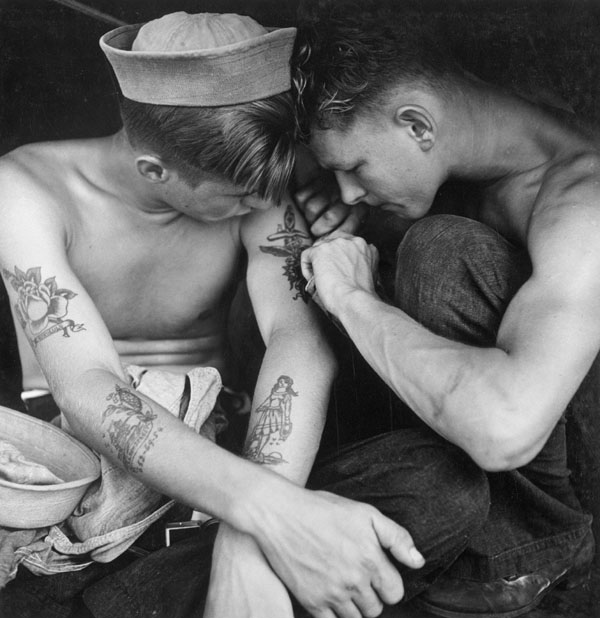
Tattooed sailor aboard the USS New Jersey, 1944

Sailor tattoos are a visual way to preserve the culture of the maritime superstitions. Sailors believed that certain symbols and talismans would help them in facing certain events in life; they thought that those symbols would attract good luck or bad luck in the worst of the cases:

Sailors, at the constant mercy of the elements, often feel the need for religious images on their bodies to appease the angry powers that caused storms and drowning far from home.

— Tattoo Archives

For example, the images of a pig and a hen were good luck; most of the smaller livestock aboard ships would float in their wooden crates and would be among the only survivors of wrecks, so these images were believed to help them survive a wreck. Another example of superstitions is the North Star (nautical star or compass rose); sailors had the belief that by wearing this symbol it would help them to find their way home.

The anchor is commonly used in sailor tattoos, which were supposed to prevent a sailor from floating away from the ship, should he fall overboard. The words 'HOLD FAST' tattooed on the knuckles would prevent a sailor from falling from aloft.

=== Line-crossing ===
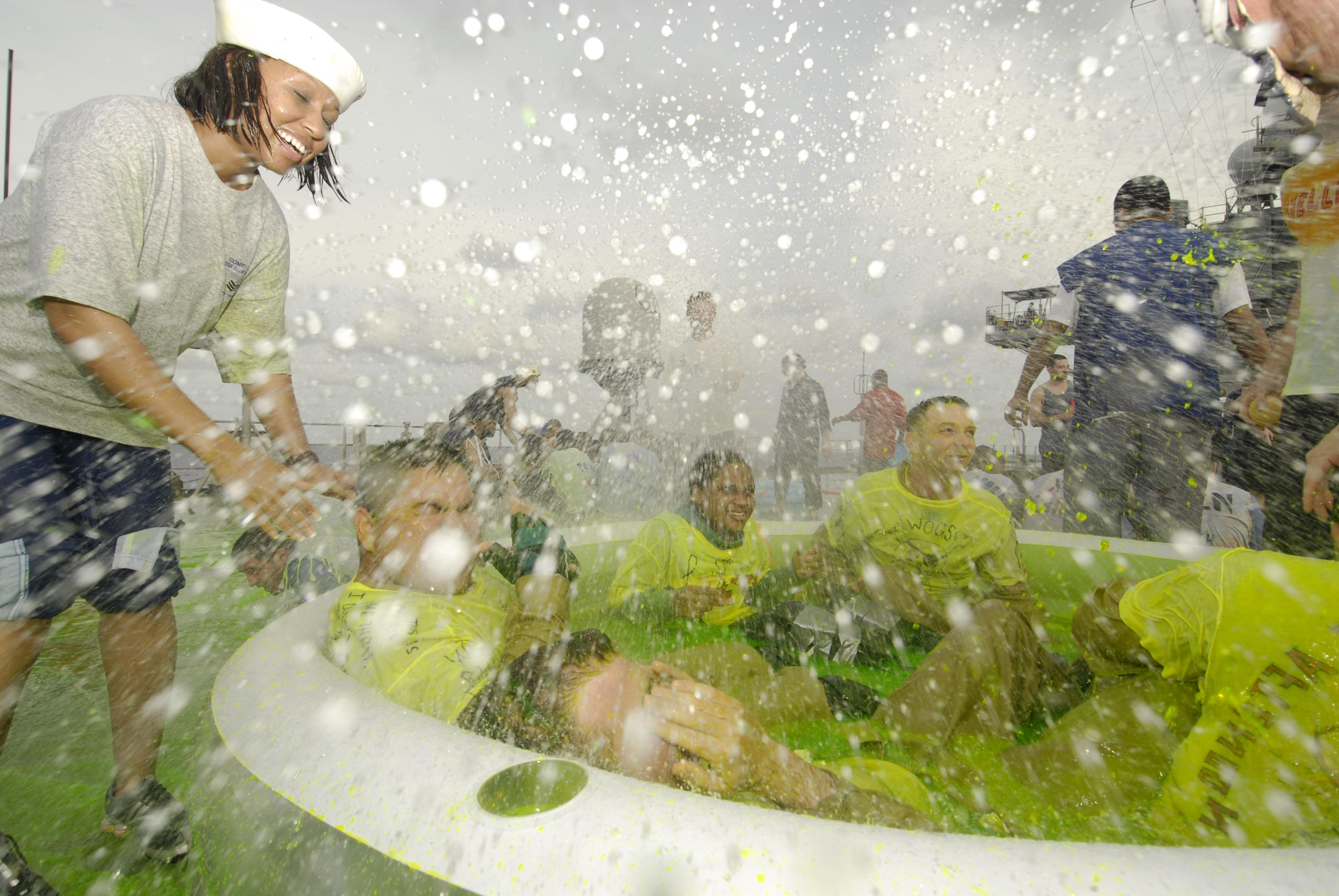
U.S. Sailors and Marines are initiated into the Kingdom of Neptune, in a line-crossing ceremony aboard USS Blue Ridge (LCC-19) as the ship passes the Equator, in 2008.

The Line-crossing ceremony commemorates a sailor's first crossing of the Equator. Its practices invoke good luck on the new sailor. The ceremony of Crossing the Line is an initiation rite in the Royal Navy, Royal Canadian Navy, U.S. Navy, U.S. Coast Guard, U.S. Marine Corps, and other navies that commemorates a sailor's first crossing of the Equator. The tradition may have originated with ceremonies when passing headlands, and become a "folly" sanctioned as a boost to morale, or have been created as a test for seasoned sailors to ensure their new shipmates were capable of handling long rough times at sea. Sailors who have already crossed the Equator are nicknamed (Trusty) Shellbacks, often referred to as Sons of Neptune; those who have not are nicknamed (Slimy) Pollywogs (in 1832 the nickname griffins was noted).

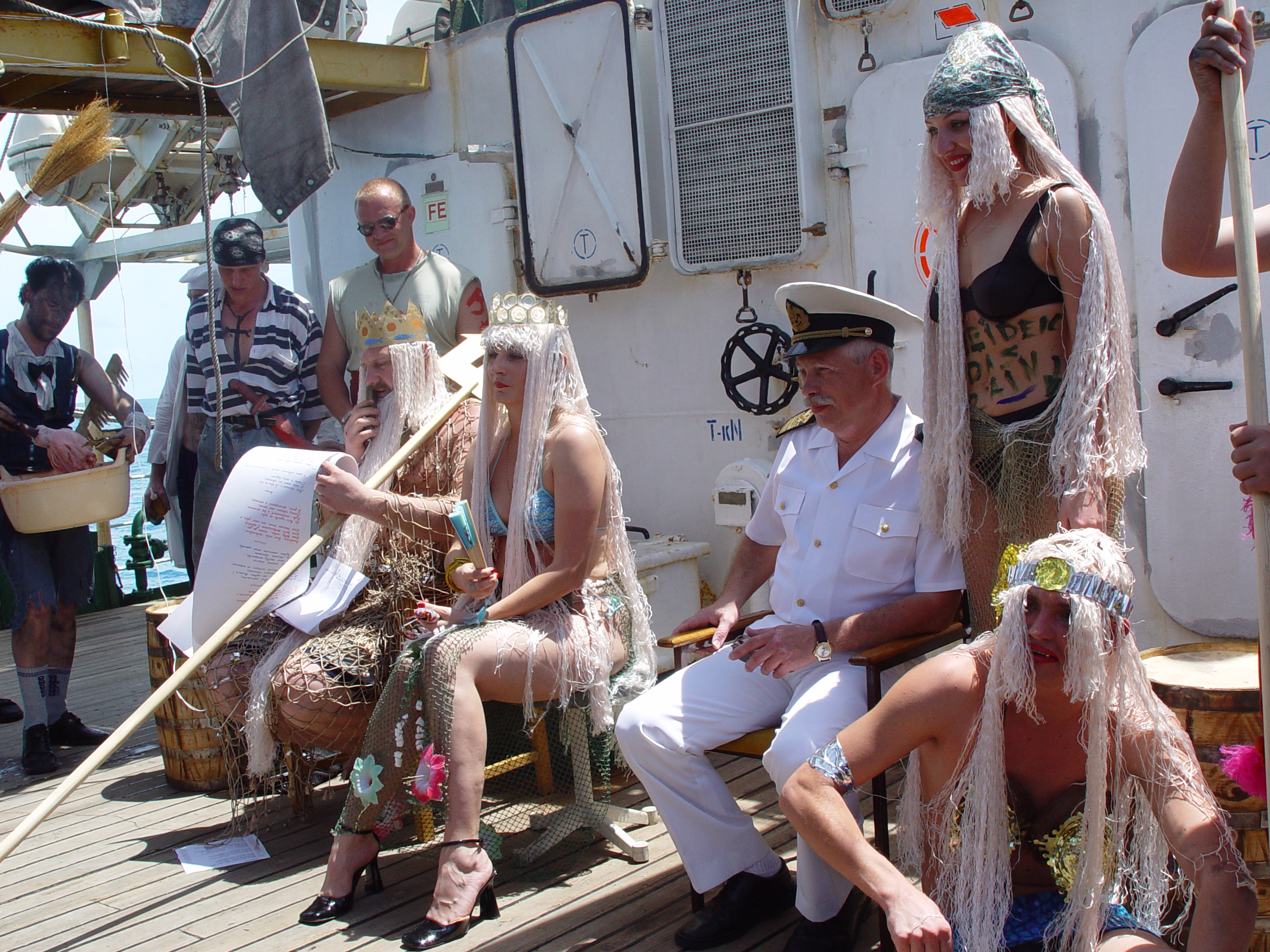
Neptune and his entourage during a Polish line-crossing ceremony (Chrzest równikowy)

After crossing the line, Pollywogs receive subpoenas to appear before King Neptune and his court (usually including his first assistant Davy Jones and her Highness Amphitrite and often various dignitaries, who are all represented by the highest ranking seamen), who officiate at the ceremony, which is often preceded by a beauty contest of men dressing up as women. Afterwards, some wogs may be "interrogated" by King Neptune and his entourage. During the ceremony, the Pollywogs undergo a number of increasingly embarrassing ordeals (such as wearing clothing inside out and backward; crawling on hands and knees; being swatted with short lengths of firehose; kissing the Royal Baby's belly coated with axle grease, etc.), largely for the entertainment of the Shellbacks. Once the ceremony is complete, a Pollywog receives a certificate declaring his new status.

U.S. President Franklin D. Roosevelt described his Crossing the Line ceremony aboard the "Happy Ship" USS Indianapolis with his "Jolly Companions" in a letter to his wife Eleanor Roosevelt on 26 November 1936:

Marvelous costumes in which King Neptune and Queen Aphrodite [sic.] and their court appeared. The Pollywogs were given an intensive initiation lasting two days, but we have all survived and are now full-fledged Shellbacks"

— FDR

Some cruise ships also have a line-crossing ceremony for their passengers.

=== Over a barrel ===
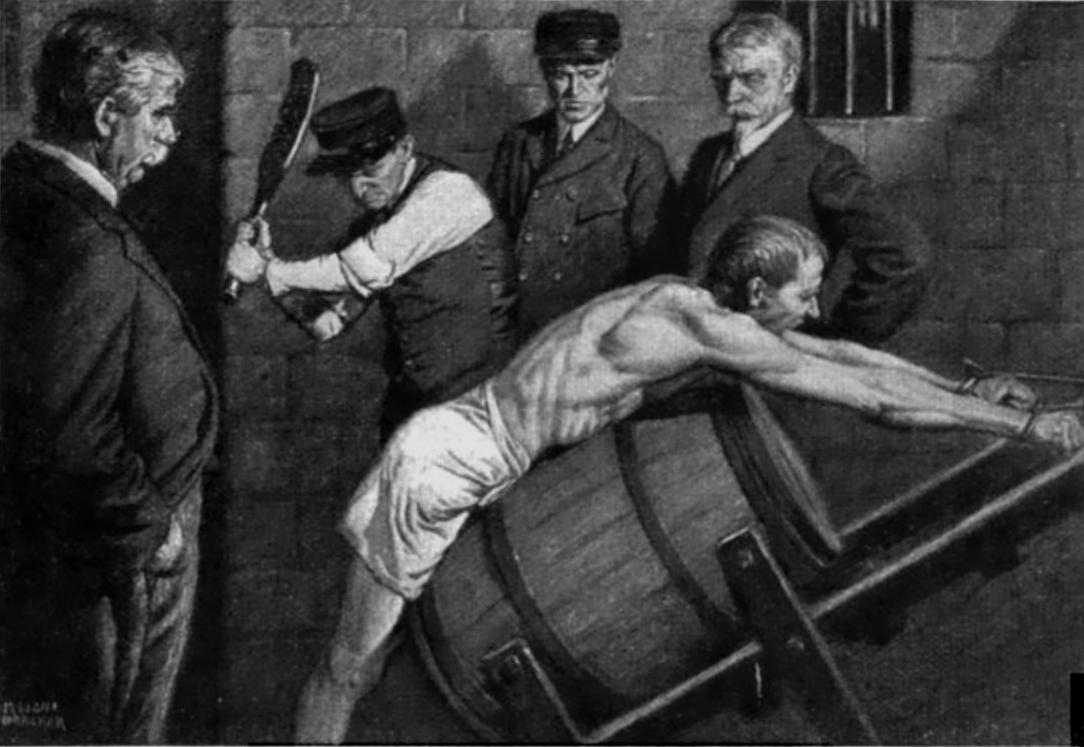
Punishment of the Paddle, 1912

The phrase over a barrel, meaning to be in a dilemma or "a weak or difficult position", may refer to the first aid practice among sailors of placing a drowning victim's head over a barrel, and rolling his body over it, in an attempt to remove aspirated water from the person's lungs. However, this etymology is challenged, and may come instead from the custom of punishing a prisoner by flogging or paddling him while he is strapped to a barrel; there is no documentary evidence it was actually used specifically as a nautical phrase. Either way, the image created in the mind is that of total helplessness and loss of control, which is a common anxiety of sailors in fear of corporal punishment.

== Theories as to origins ==
Many theories have formed as to explain these phenomena and why they exist. Jakob Jakobsen theorised that such practices existed with the intent to confuse and ward off fairies and protect the sailors. Lockwood concurred as well with the general line of thought and concluded it was also done so as to not summon dangerous animals such as whales or ravens. Solheim follows this same line of thought and considers it also be done to protect loved ones back on land from such animals and spirits.

Bairbre Ní Fhloinn critiques this line of thought concluding it to be reductionist and insulting to the intelligence of fishermen; however, she does admit it may be a factor. Sailors are well aware of the inherent risks of sailing, and even in the 21st century, "fishers and related fishing workers" in the U.S. have the second most dangerous occupation.

A sailor's life is inherently difficult, wrote one sailor in 1840:

Yet a sailor's life is at best, but a mixture of a little good with much evil, and a little pleasure with much pain. The beautiful is linked with the revolting, the sublime with the commonplace, and the solemn with the ludicrous.

From ancient times to the 20th Century, sailing has been seen as a risky activity; in Psalm 107 (106 in the Latin Vulgate version):

the singing of Psalm 107, is still used today, and holds a special meaning to mariners:

‘They that go down to the sea in ships;
That do business in great waters;

These see the works of the Lord, and His wonders in the deep.’

— Psalm 107:23-24, cited by Queen Alexandra

The next few verses explain further:

For he commandeth, and raiseth the stormy wind, which lifteth up the waves thereof.
They mount up to the heaven, they go down again to the depths: their soul is melted because of trouble.
They reel to and fro, and stagger like a drunken man, and are at their wit's end.
Then they cry unto the Lord in their trouble, and he bringeth them out of their distresses.
He maketh the storm a calm, so that the waves thereof are still.

Then are they glad because they be quiet; so he bringeth them unto their desired haven.

— Psalm 107:25-30

The hymn, Eternal Father, Strong to Save was inspired by Psalm 107.

== See also ==
- Baseball superstition
- The Colossus of Rhodes (novel)
- Distress signal
- Fata Morgana (mirage)
- Flying Dutchman
- Superstition in India
- Jesus walking on water
- Lady Lovibond
- List of bad luck signs
- List of lucky symbols
- List of occult terms
- Piracy in the Atlantic World
- Rabbits on the Isle of Portland
- Russian traditions and superstitions
  - Soyuz TMA-11
- Sailor tattoo
- Sailor's Luck
- Shen (clam-monster)
- Storm petrel
- Theatrical superstitions
- Tide jewels
- Utsuro-bune
- Unknown Sailor
