= Nacioun Gardiano =

The Nacioun gardiano is a maintenance association founded in 1904 in France. Its goal is to "maintain and glorify the costume, customs, and traditions of the country of Arles, the Camargue and the bullfighting countries".

== History ==
=== The foundation of the Virginian Coumitat ===
Folco de Baroncelli-Javon, at the request of Frédéric Mistral, decided to involve the herdsmen in the Camargue festivities such as the abrivade, the ferrade, the Camargue race, etc. Faced with success, on 24 June 1904 at the mas de l'Amarèu, the Marquis and some of his friends founded the Coumitat Virginien. The ten founders were: Jules Grand de Marsillargues, captain, Jean Grand de Gallargues, secretary, Jean Bérard de Gallargues, treasurer, Folco de Baroncelli, Marcel Grand, Jules Arnaud, Émile Marignan, Henri Bérard, Alphonse Hébrard and Yvan Pranishnikoff.

=== Tradition and tourism ===
The tourist office of Provence, having organized a special trip from Marseille to Saintes-Maries-de-la-Mer for some two hundred tourists on 17 May 1908, the Marquis de Baroncelli took the initiative to welcome them at the station, on horseback with his guardians, then accompanied them to the village. This caused a lot of noise and therefore “tradition” became one of the major assets of Saintain tourism.

=== Creation of Nacioun Gardiano ===
On 24 May 1935 the herdsmen welcomed the Saintes and Sara for the sea bath.

The association was declared in the official journal on 16 September 1909 under its name Nacioun Gardiano and its registered office in Saintes-Maries-de-la-Mer. They chose a banner on which appears on one side the barque des Saintes, surmounted by the star with the seven rays of Félibrige, on the other side the blood and gold cross of Languedoc flanked by the war cry of the Albigensians "Toulouso, ( Prouvenço) e Avignoun ”. During the ceremonies it was tied to the shaft of the Camargue trident (lou ferri).

== See also ==
- Cross of Camargue
