= Luke 8 =

- ← chapter 7 chapter 9 →
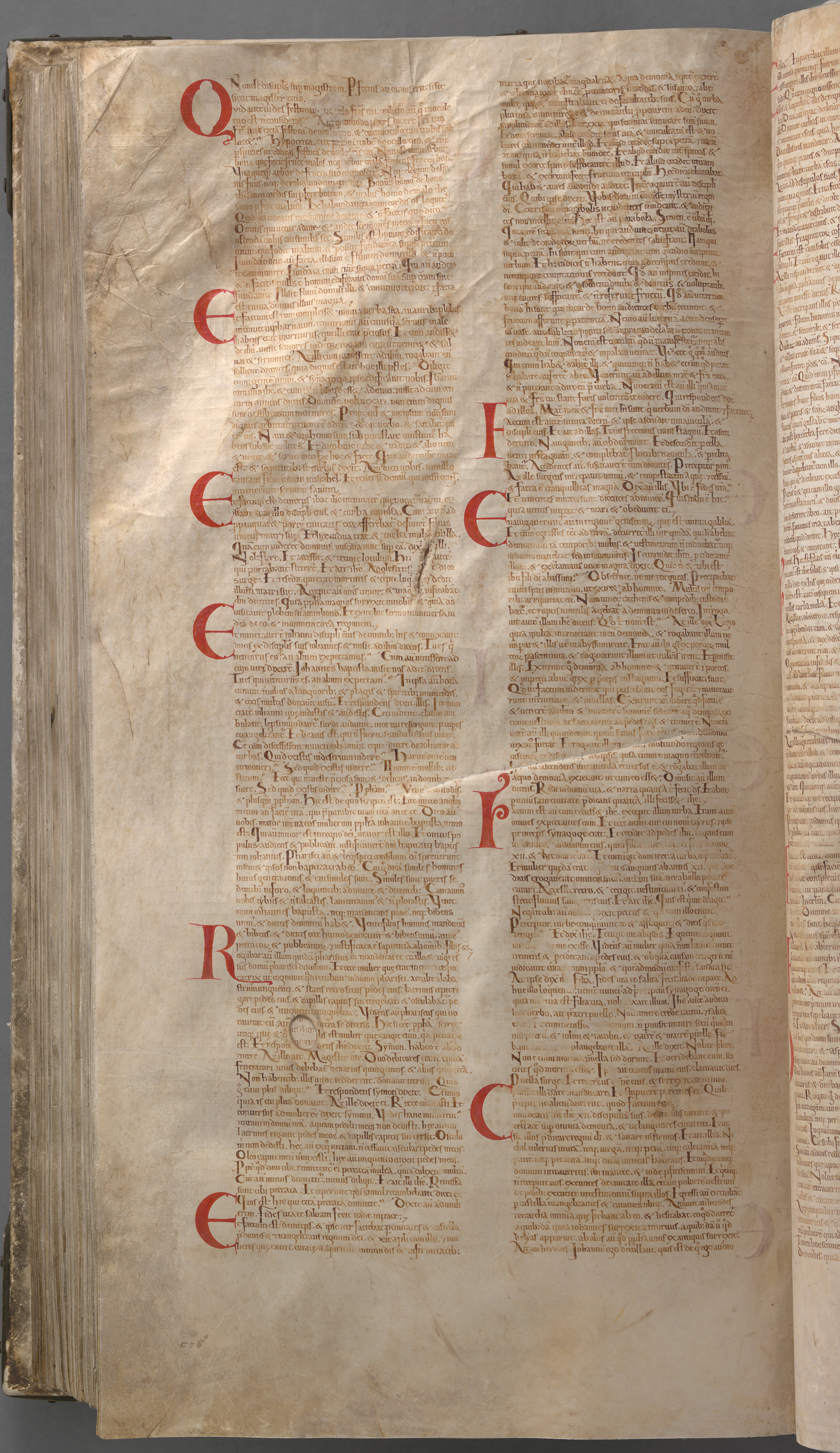
- The Latin text of Luke 6:40–9:9 in Codex Gigas (13th century)
- Book: Gospel of Luke
- Category: Gospel
- Christian Bible part: New Testament
- Order in the Christian part: 3

Luke 8 is the eighth chapter of the Gospel of Luke in the New Testament of the Christian Bible. Early Christian tradition uniformly affirmed that Luke the Evangelist, a companion of Paul the Apostle on his missionary journeys, composed both this Gospel and the Acts of the Apostles., but critical opinion on the tradition was evenly divided at the end of the 20th century. This chapter mentions the women who supported Jesus and records some of the great miracles he performed, as well as several parables told by him.

== Text ==
The original text was written in Koine Greek. This chapter is divided into 56 verses. Some early manuscripts containing the text of this chapter are:

- Papyrus 75 (175–225)
- Codex Vaticanus (325–350)
- Codex Sinaiticus (330–360)
- Codex Bezae (~400)
- Codex Washingtonianus (~400)
- Codex Alexandrinus (400–440)
- Codex Ephraemi Rescriptus (~450; extant verses 29–56).

== The women who sustained Jesus (verses 1–3) ==
Now it came to pass, afterward, that He went through every city and village, preaching and bringing the glad tidings of the kingdom of God. And the twelve were with Him, ²and certain women who had been healed of evil spirits and infirmities—Mary called Magdalene, out of whom had come seven demons, ³and Joanna the wife of Chuza, Herod’s steward, and Susanna, and many others who provided for Him from their substance.

— Luke 8:1–3

Following a "fairly static period", Jesus continues his itinerant ministry within "every city and village" within Galilee.

In verses 2 and 3, Mary called Magdalene, Joanna the wife of Chuza, and Susanna are named as women who provided material sustenance to Jesus during his travels, along with other unnamed women. While Matthew, Mark and John mentioned the names of the women present at the cross, Luke only refers them as "the women that followed him [Jesus] from Galilee" (Luke 23:49), but he names them at the end in the story of the women's visit to the empty tomb ("It was Mary Magdalene and Joanna, and Mary the mother of James, and other women that were with them, which told these things unto the apostles." Luke 24:10). The two passages with the names of some women alongside the mention of the "twelve" and "apostles", respectively (Luke 8:1–3 and Luke 24:10), "form a literary inclusio" which brackets the major part of Jesus' ministry (leaving out only the earliest part of it). (Note: Luke has another bigger inclusio using Simon Peter as "both the first and the last disciple to be named in his Gospel" (Luke 4:38; Luke 24:34), similar to Mark.) Henry Alford notes that this material is "peculiar to Luke", and according to Richard Bauckham, this surely implies that Luke receives his special information from "one (most likely Joanna) or more than one of" the women. Eric Franklin notes that the "seven demons" from which Mary had been liberated reflected "the severe nature of her illness", not an earlier life of immorality.

Irish archbishop John McEvilly notes that for "ministered unto him" (verse 3), some versions read "unto them", but "the Vulgate reading (ministrabant ei: they served him) is the best supported by critical evidence".

== The parable of the sower and the purpose of the parables (verses 4–15) ==
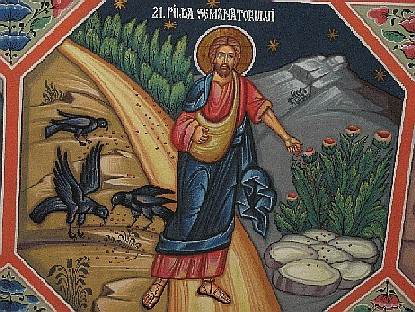
An icon depicting the Sower (Biserica Ortodoxă din Deal, Cluj-Napoca, Romania)

The words of verse 4, a great crowd was gathered, and people were coming to Jesus from every town, suggest that in each city or village those who lived there were joined by a multitude who travelled with Jesus to hear him preach. Protestant writer Heinrich Meyer interprets καὶ τῶν κατὰ πόλιν, kai tōn kata polin as meaning also those coming city by city. Jesus tells a story to the crowd. In the story, a sower sowed seed on the path, on rocky ground and among thorns, locations which offered "no hope of a harvest", and the seed was lost; but when seed fell on good earth it grew a hundredfold (verse 8).

This parable, sometimes called the "Parable of the Soils", is also found in the Matthew 13:1–23 and Mark 4:1–20. In Luke's account, Jesus tells this parable to the large crowd assembled "from every city" (verse 4), whereas in Matthew and Mark's accounts it is one of the parables Jesus taught from a boat off the shore of the Sea of Galilee (Matthew 13:2, Mark 4:1). Luke has Jesus teach from a boat in the lake in chapter 5 but he does not detail there the content of Jesus's teaching. Non-conformist minister Alexander Maclaren pictures such crowds assembling to listen to Jesus that "the cities of Galilee seemed emptied out to hear Him", and thus the reader can see many who would hear the word and bear fruit "a hundredfold", as well as how many who would "fall away". In verse 14, on those who hear the word without bearing fruit to maturity, Alford notes that the "cares of life", the "riches of life" and the "pleasures of life" should all be inferred.

== Parable of the lamp (verses 16–18) ==
In this parable, Jesus notes that no-one lights a lamp and then hides it: the lamp is put on a stand, so that people may see it. Use of the light, to see by it, is highlighted in paraphrase versions. Verse 16 is repeated at Luke 11:33. Verses 16 and 17 point to the future that the word of the Lord would grow 'mightily and prevailed' (Acts 19:20), with verse 18 giving warning to listen to it 'with patient endurance' and discrimination.

== Mother and brothers of Jesus (verses 19–21) ==
This passage records that Jesus' mother and brothers came seeking him. When Jesus was informed of their presence, he answered by extending the family relationship to all those who "hear the word of God and do it". Mary and Jesus' brothers would later be counted among the earliest disciples waiting for the gift of the Spirit (Acts 1:14).

== The storm calmed (verses 22–25) ==
Jesus and his disciples were crossing the Sea of Galilee one evening in a boat when a furious storm came up, with the waves breaking over the boat, so that it was nearly swamped. Jesus was in the stern, sleeping on a cushion, but the disciples woke him and said to him, "Teacher, don't you care if we drown?" Jesus got up, rebuked the wind and said to the waves, "Quiet! Be still!" Then the wind died down and it was completely calm. This account is also recorded in the Gospel of Matthew (8:23–27) and Gospel of Mark 4:35–41). As Genesis 1:2 states how the Spirit of God tamed the waters at creation, Moses with the command over the Red Sea (Exodus 14; cf. Isaiah 51:9 of God's victory over the sea at the Exodus) and Elijah with command over the Jordan River (2 Kings 2:8), thus Jesus, as 'God's final act of redemption', here revealed his total power over "the deep".

== The Gerasene demoniac (verses 28–39) ==
The miracle took place when Jesus went across the lake to the land of the Gerasenes (or Gadarenes), the modern Jerash in Jordan. There a man possessed by an evil spirit came from the caves to meet him. No one could bind this man anymore, not even with a chain, for no one was strong enough to subdue him. Night and day among the tombs and in the hills he would cry out and cut himself with stones. When he saw Jesus from a distance, he ran and fell on his knees in front of him. He shouted at the top of his voice, "What do you want with me, Jesus, Son of the Most High God? In God's name don't torture me!" For Jesus had said to him, "Come out of this man, you evil spirit!"

Then Jesus asked him, "What is your name?" "My name is Legion," he replied, "for we are many". And he begged Jesus again and again not to send them out of the area.

A large herd of pigs was feeding on the nearby hillside. The demons begged Jesus, "Send us among the pigs; allow us to go into them." He gave them permission, and the evil spirits came out and went into the pigs. The herd rushed down the steep bank into the lake and were drowned.

The term 'the Most High God' used to call Jesus's father by the tormented man, was also used by the spirit-possessed slave girl at Philippi who was later healed by Paul (Acts 16:17).

== Raising of Jairus' daughter and healing the bleeding woman (verses 40–56) ==
The story immediately follows the exorcism at Gerasa. Back in Galilee, Jairus, a patron or ruler of a Galilee synagogue, had asked Jesus to heal his 12-year-old daughter, who was dying (in Matthew's account, Jairus used hyperbolic expressions in his anxiety: ‘My daughter is even now dead’). As they were travelling to Jairus' house, a sick woman in the crowd touched the border (or possibly the fringe) of Jesus' cloak and was healed of her sickness. Jairus' daughter was then reported as having died, and Jairus was therefore advised not to trouble Jesus, 'the teacher', any further. Jesus, however, continued to the house, stating that the girl was not dead but asleep, and restored her to health. The chapter ends with Jesus' commands that the girl should be fed and that Jairus and his wife should tell no-one what had happened.

=== Tzitzit ===
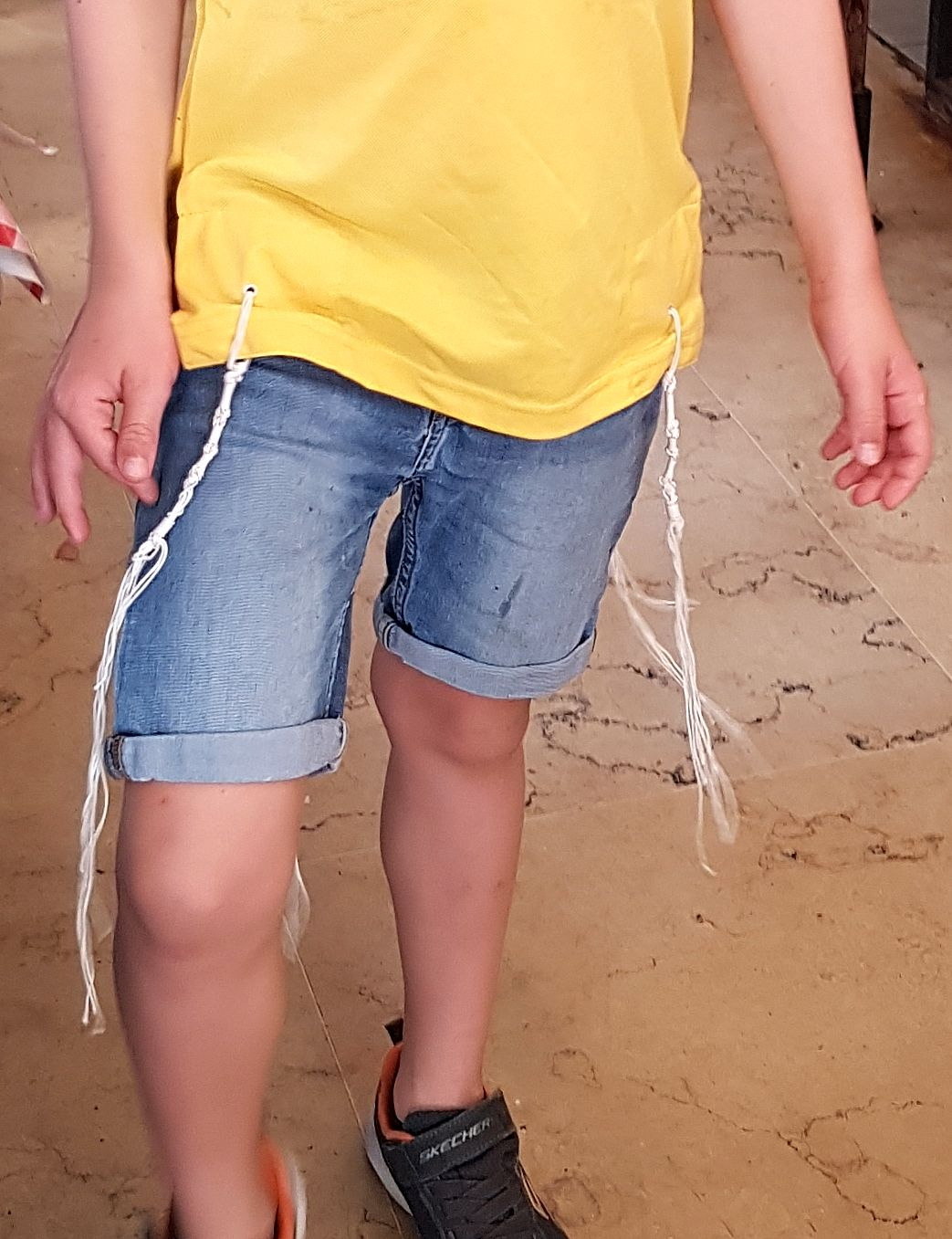
A child's tzitzit attached to school shirt

Luke's and Matthew's accounts specify that the bleeding woman touched the "fringe" of his cloak, using the Greek word kraspedon, which also appears in Mark 6. The Pharisees (one of the sects of Second Temple Judaism), who were the progenitors of modern Rabbinic Judaism, were in the habit of wearing extra-long fringes or tassels (Matthew 23:5), a reference to the formative çîçîth (tzitzit). Because of the Pharisees' authority, people regarded the fringe as having a mystical quality.

== See also ==
- Joanna, wife of Chuza
- Mary of Magdalene
- Ministry of Jesus
- Miracles of Jesus
- Parables of Jesus
- Susanna (disciple)
- Related Bible parts: Numbers 15; Deuteronomy 22; Joshua 10; Matthew 8, 11, 12, 13 , 14; Mark 4, 5, 6, 15; Luke 7, 23 , and 24

== Sources ==
- Bauckham, Richard (2017). Jesus and the Eyewitnesses (2nd ed.). Wm. B. Eerdmans. ISBN 978-0-80287431-3.
- Franklin, Eric (2007). "59. Luke". In Barton, John; Muddiman, John (eds.). The Oxford Bible Commentary (paperback) (1st ed.). Oxford University Press. pp. 922–59. ISBN 978-0-19927718-6.

Preceded by Luke 7	Chapters of the Bible; Gospel of Luke	Succeeded by Luke 9
