= Luke 24 =

- ← chapter 23 John 1 →
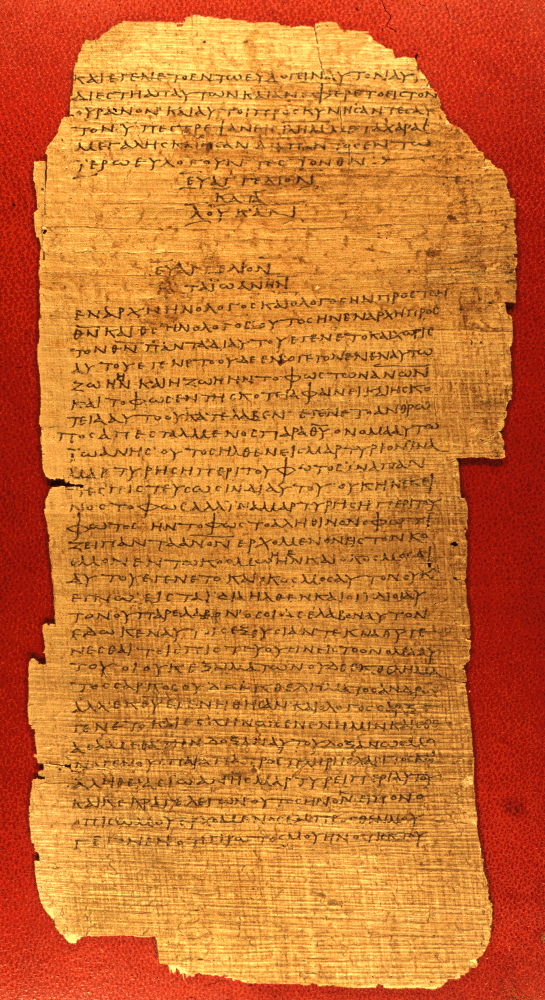
- Luke 24:51–53, continued with John 1:1–16, on Papyrus 75, written about AD 175–225
- Book: Gospel of Luke
- Category: Gospel
- Christian Bible part: New Testament
- Order in the Christian part: 3

Luke 24 is the twenty-fourth and final chapter of the Gospel of Luke in the New Testament of the Christian Bible. Early Christian tradition uniformly affirmed that Luke the Evangelist composed this Gospel as well as the Acts of the Apostles. Scholarly opinion on the tradition was evenly divided at the end of the 20th century. This chapter records the discovery of the resurrection of Jesus Christ, his appearances to his disciples and his ascension into heaven.

== Text ==
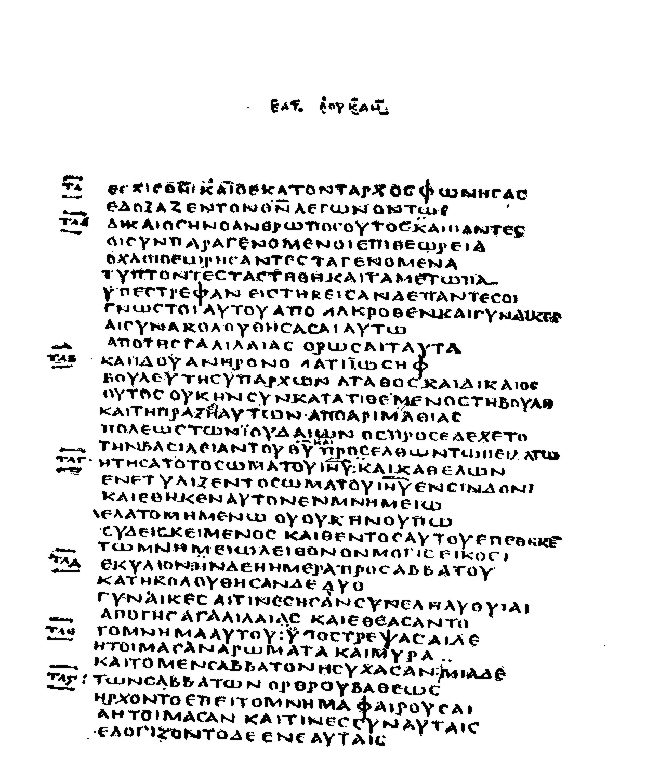
Greek text

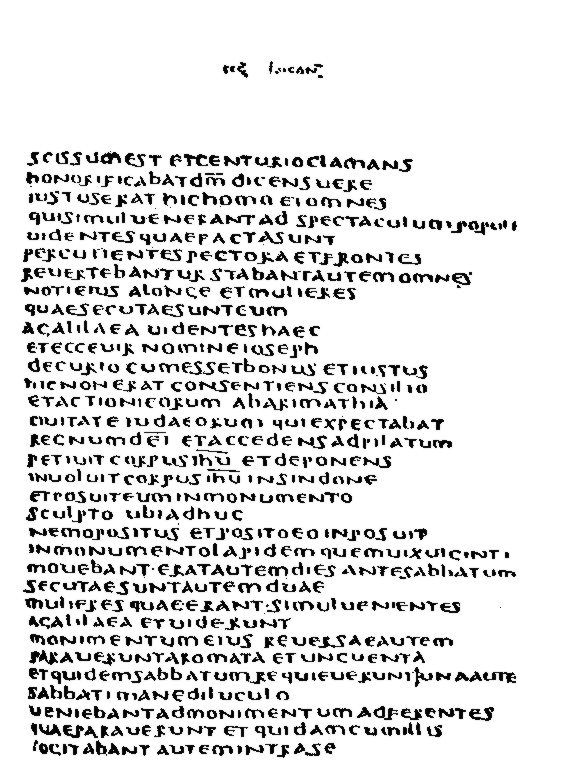
Latin text

Luke 23:47–24:1 in Codex Bezae (Cambridge University Library MS. Nn.2.41; AD ~400)

The original text was written in Koine Greek. Some early manuscripts containing the text of this chapter are:

- Papyrus 75 (AD 175–225)
- Codex Vaticanus (325–350)
- Codex Sinaiticus (330–360)
- Codex Bezae (~400)
- Codex Washingtonianus (~400)
- Codex Alexandrinus (400–440)
- Codex Ephraemi Rescriptus (~450; extant verses 1–6, 46–53).

This chapter is divided into 53 verses.

== Resurrection morning (verses 1–12) ==
=== Context ===
The narrative in chapter 24 continues the events concluding chapter 23 without a break:

It was the day of Preparation, and the sabbath was beginning. The women who had come with him from Galilee followed, and they saw the tomb and how his body was laid. Then they returned, and prepared spices and ointments ... But on the first day of the week, at early dawn, they came to the tomb, taking the spices that they had prepared. They found the stone rolled away from the tomb

— Luke 23:54–24:2 (New Revised Standard Version)

=== Verse 1 ===
Now upon the first day of the week, very early in the morning, they came unto the sepulchre, bringing the spices which they had prepared, and certain others with them.

Frederic Farrar, in the Cambridge Bible for Schools and Colleges, suggests that the words "certain others" are "probably spurious", not being part of the text in the Codex Sinaiticus, Codex Vaticanus, Codex Ephraemi Rescriptus or Codex Regius manuscripts.

Traditional sites of Jesus' tomb
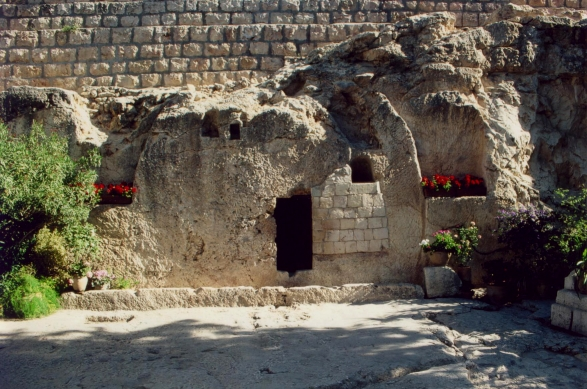
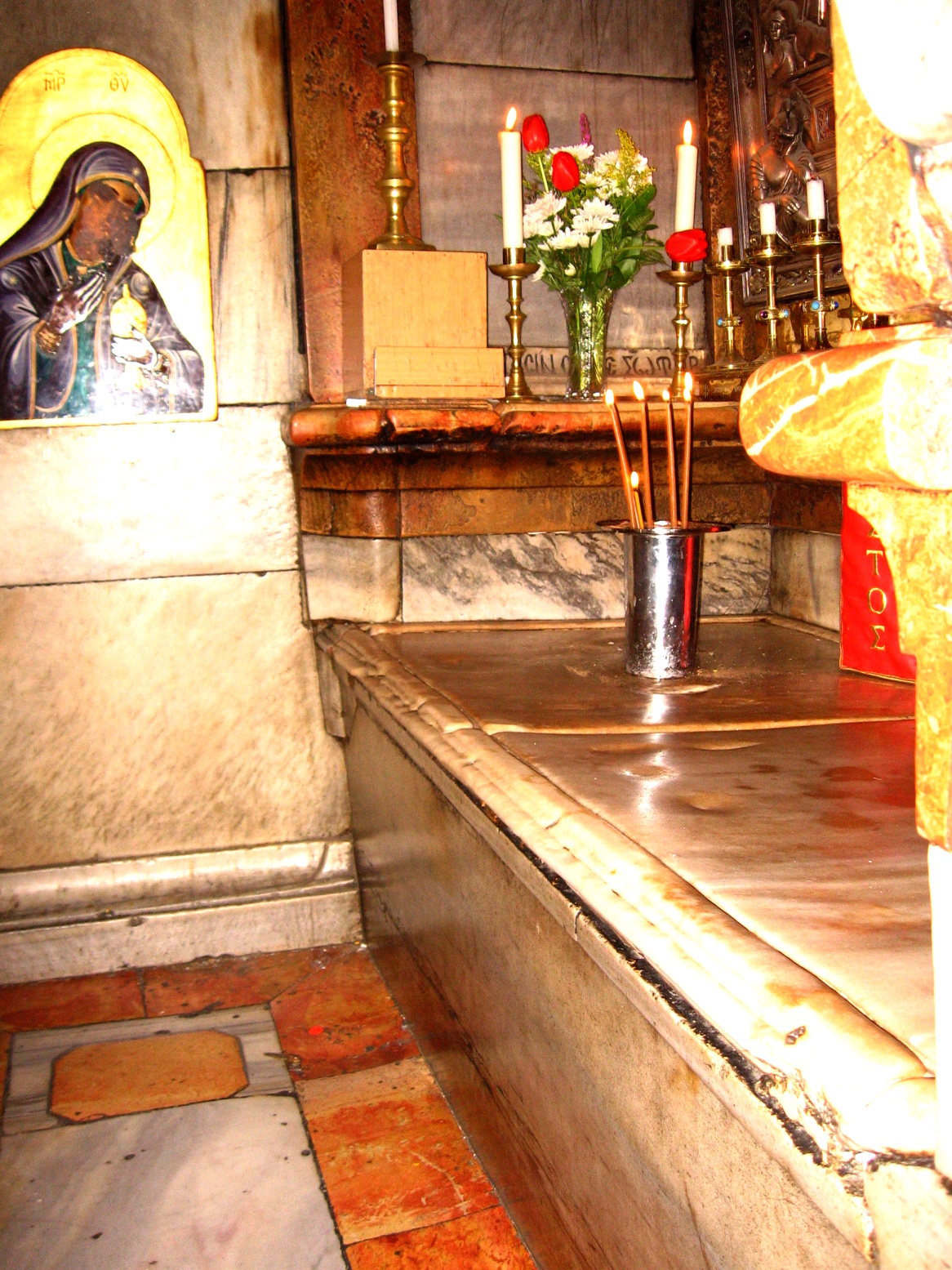
Left: outside of Garden Tomb; right: inside of the Church of the Holy Sepulchre

=== Verse 2 ===
They found the stone rolled away from the tomb,

The positioning of a stone outside the tomb is mentioned in the accounts of Jesus' burial in Matthew and Mark, but not in Luke.

=== Verse 3 ===
but when they went in they did not find the body.

Some ancient authorities add "of the Lord Jesus"; these words are included in many English translations.

=== Verse 10 ===
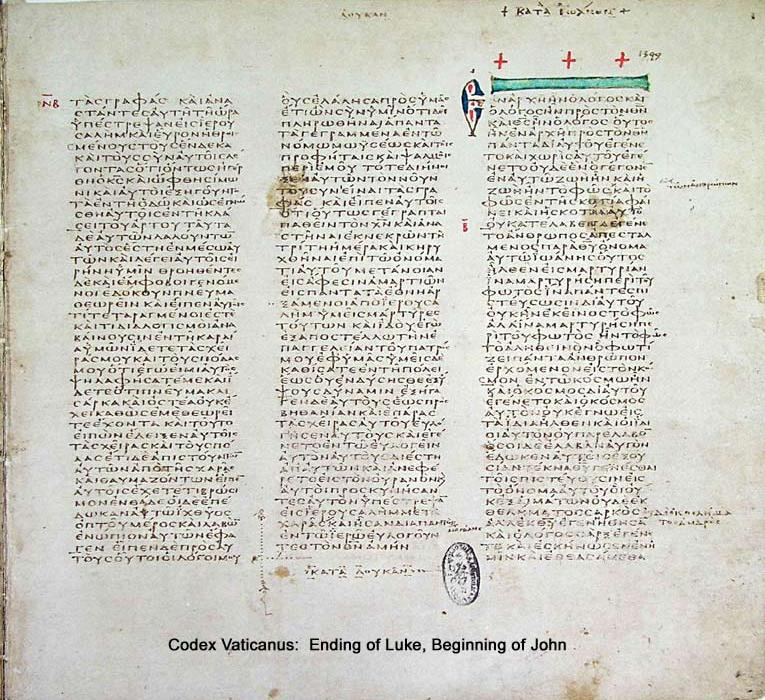
Ending of Luke and Beginning of John on the same page of Codex Vaticanus (c. 300–325)

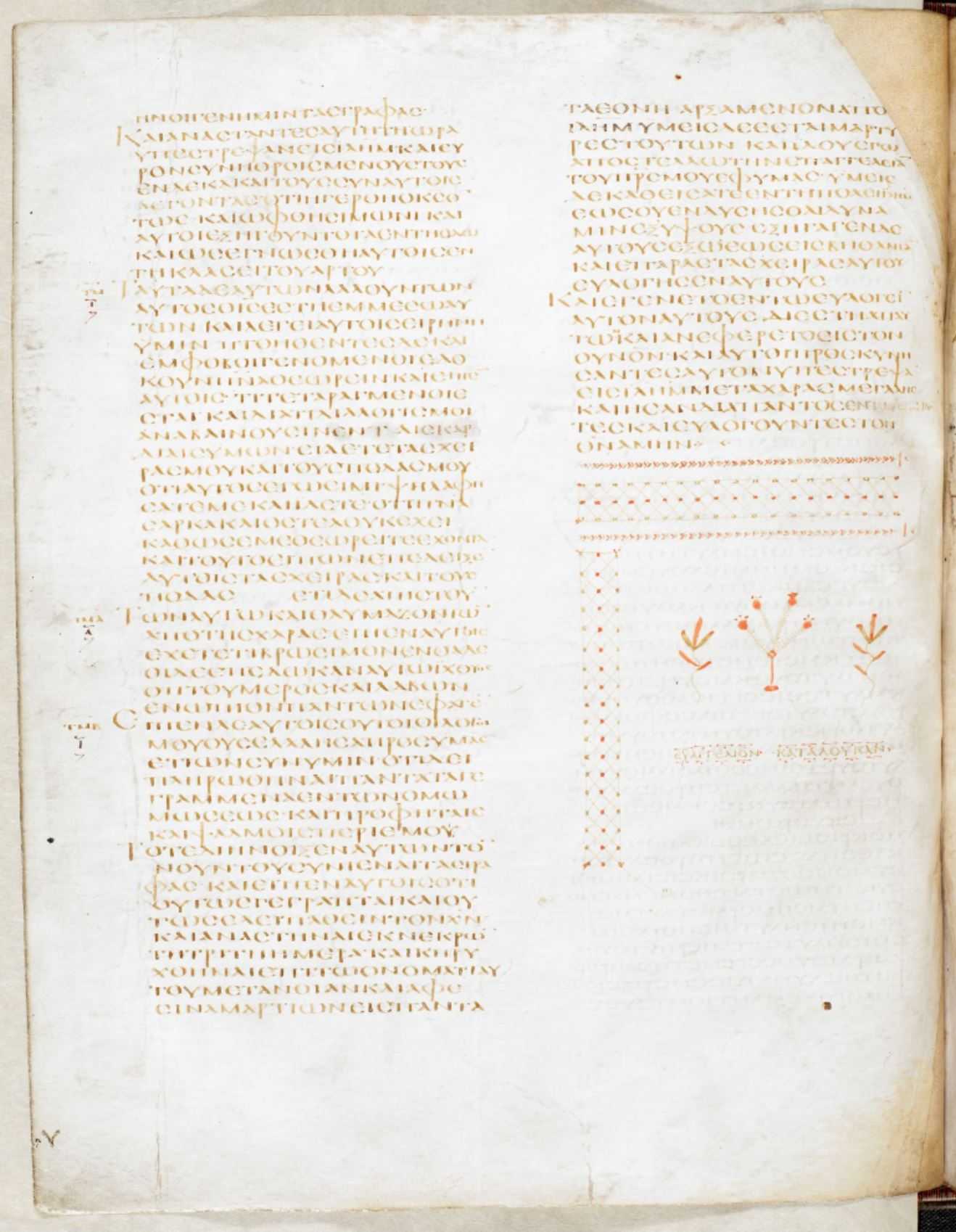
Folio 41v of Codex Alexandrinus (c. 400–440) containing the ending of the Gospel of Luke

Now it was Mary Magdalene, Joanna, Mary the mother of James, and the other women with them, who told these things to the apostles.

The women who had come with Jesus from Galilee, as listed in Luke 8:2-3, included "Mary Magdalene, Joanna, Mary the mother of James, and many others: these who provided material sustenance to Jesus during his travels. The names of some women are mentioned in the other gospels, but only Luke's gospel mentions Joanna, implying that Luke receives his special information from "one (most likely Joanna) or more than one of" the women. In Luke 8:1–3 Mary called Magdalene, Joanna the wife of Chuza, and Susanna are named as women, along with other unnamed women.

While Matthew, Mark and John mentioned the names of the women present at the cross, Luke only refers them as "the women who had followed him from Galilee" (Luke 23:49), but he names the women at the end in the story of the women's visit to the empty tomb (Luke 24:10). The two passages with the names of some women alongside the mention of the "twelve" and "apostles", respectively (Luke 8:1–3 and Luke 24:10), "form a literary inclusio" which brackets the major part of Jesus' ministry (leaving out only the earliest part of it). (Note: Luke has another bigger inclusio using Simon Peter as "both the first and the last disciple to be named in his Gospel" (Luke 4:38; Luke 24:34), similar to Mark.)

=== Verse 12 ===
But Peter arose and ran to the tomb; and stooping down, he saw the linen cloths lying by themselves; and he departed, marveling to himself at what had happened.

This verse and verse 34, "The Lord is risen indeed, and has appeared to Simon!", suggest that Peter (alone) went to the tomb, whereas verse 24, And certain of those who were with us went to the tomb and found it just as the women had said, implies more than one person.

American biblical scholar Kim Dreisbach states that Greek: οθονια (othonia), translated here as "linen cloths", is "a word of uncertain meaning ... probably best translated as a generic plural for grave clothes". The same word is used in John 19:40.

== The road to Emmaus (verses 13–35) ==
Luke 24:13–35 describes Jesus' appearance to two disciples who are walking from Jerusalem to Emmaus, which is said to be 60 stadia (10.4 to 12 km, depending on the definition of stadion is used) from Jerusalem. One of the disciples is named Cleopas (verse 18), while his companion remains unnamed.

=== Verse 24 ===
Some of those who were with us went to the tomb and found it just as the women had said, but him they did not see.

This verse shares words and language with John 20:3-4. A note in the Jerusalem Bible suggests that this verse may allude to the visit which Peter and the Beloved Disciple made to the tomb as reported in John.

== Jesus appears to the apostles (verses 36–49) ==
=== Verse 36 ===
Now as they said these things, Jesus Himself stood in the midst of them, and said to them, "Peace to you."

- "Peace to you" (KJV: "Peace be unto you"): rendering the Greek phrase εἰρήνη ὑμῖν, eirēnē hymin, which is a literal translation of the customary Jewish salutation שָׁלוֹם לָכֶם, shalom lekom (cf. Matthew 10:12; Luke 10:5). This account agrees with John 20:19, which notes that "the doors of the room had been closed for fear of the Jews".

== The ascension of Jesus (verses 50–53) ==
=== Verse 51 ===
Now it came to pass, while He blessed them, that He was parted from them and carried up into heaven.

The words "and carried up into heaven" are not included in some ancient texts of the gospel.

=== Verse 53 ===
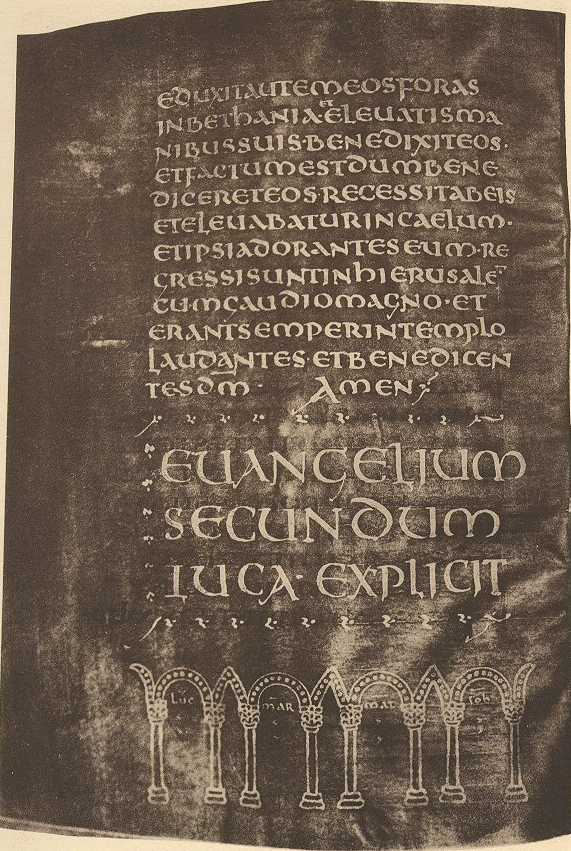
The end (explicit) of the Gospel of Luke in Codex Brixianus from 6th century

and were continually in the temple praising and blessing God. Amen.

Luke's gospel ends where it began, in the temple.

The King James Version ends with the word "Amen", following the Textus Receptus, but modern critical editions of the New Testament exclude this word, as do many modern English translations. In a manuscript copy of Beza's, there are the added words:

The Gospel according to Saint Luke was published fifteen years after the ascension of Christ.

This tradition also known to the 11th-century Byzantine bishop Theophylact of Ohrid.

== See also ==
- Ascension of Jesus
- Emmaus
- Holy Week
- Jerusalem
- Ministry of Jesus
- Overview of resurrection appearances in the Gospels and Paul
- Relics associated with Jesus
- Shroud of Turin
- Sudarium of Oviedo
- Related Bible parts: Matthew 28, Mark 16, Luke 8, Luke 23, John 20, Acts 1, Acts 2, 1 Corinthians 15

== Bibliography ==
- Bauckham, Richard (2017). Jesus and the Eyewitnesses (2nd ed.). Wm. B. Eerdmans Publishing. ISBN 9780802874313.

Preceded by Luke 23	Chapters of the Bible; Gospel of Luke	Succeeded by John 1
