= Myrrhbearers =

Women with myrrh who came to the tomb of Christ

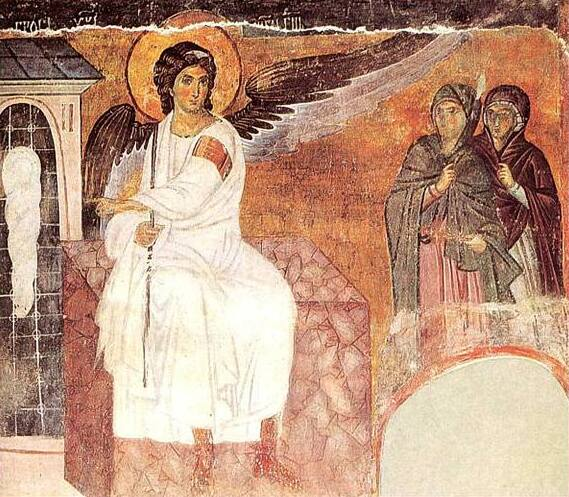
White Angel, depicting myrrhbearers at Christ's grave, c. 1235 AD, Mileševa monastery in Serbia

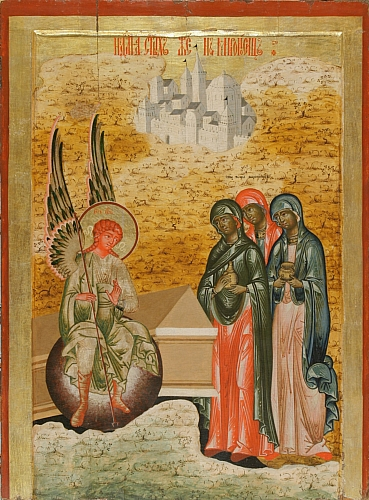
Eastern Orthodox icon of the Myrrhbearing Women at the Tomb of Christ (Kizhi, Russia, 18th century)

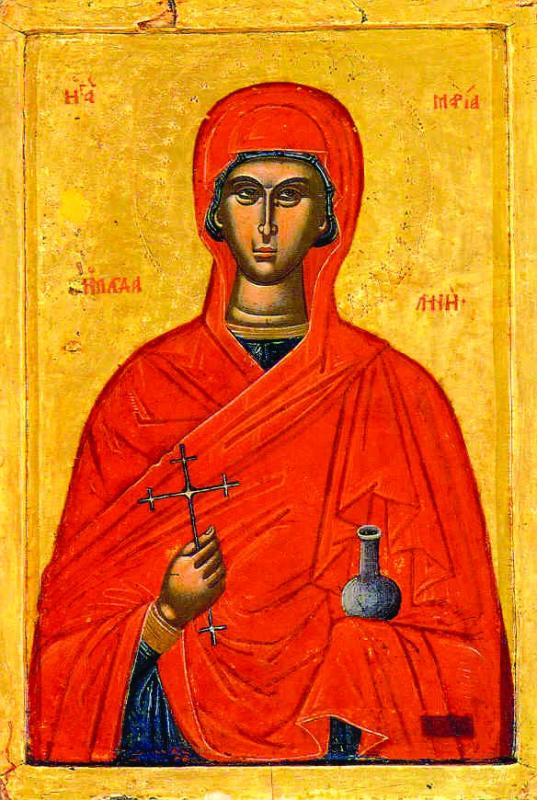
Icon of Mary Magdalene as a Myrrhbearer

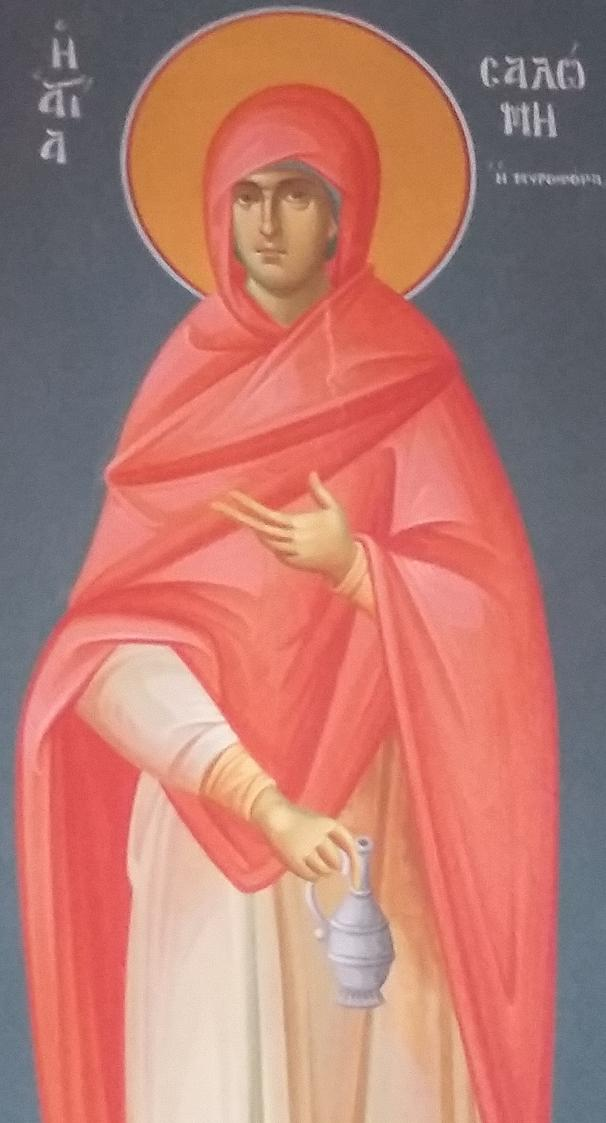
Hagiography, fresco, of Saint Salome the Myrrhbearer in Greek Orthodox Church

In Eastern Orthodox Christian tradition the Myrrhbearers (Greek: Μυροφόροι; Latin: Myrophora; Serbian: мироноснице; Church Slavonic: Жены́-мѷроно́сицы; Romanian: mironosițe) are the individuals mentioned in the New Testament who were directly involved in the burial or who discovered the empty tomb following the resurrection of Jesus. The term traditionally refers to the women who came with myrrh to the tomb of Christ early in the morning to find it empty. Also included are Joseph of Arimathea and Nicodemus, who took the body of Jesus down from the cross, anointed it with myrrh and aloes, wrapped it in clean linen, and placed it in a new tomb. (Note: See Bible verses: Matthew 27:55–61; Matthew 28:1–10; Mark 15:40–16:11; Luke 23:50–24:10; John 19:38–20:18) In Western Christianity, the women at the tomb, the Three Marys or other variants are the terms normally used.

== Narrative and tradition ==
The women followed Jesus during his earthly ministry in Galilee, providing for him and his followers out of their own means. (Note: Mark 15:41) They remained faithful to him even during the most dangerous time of his arrest and execution, and not only stood by the cross, but accompanied him to his burial, noticing where the tomb was located. Because of the impending Shabbat (Sabbath), it was necessary for the burial preparations to be brief. Jewish custom at the time dictated that mourners return to the tomb every day for three days. Once the Sabbath had passed, the women returned at the earliest possible moment, bringing myrrh to anoint the body. It was at this point that the Resurrection was revealed to them, and they were commissioned to go and tell the Apostles. They were, in effect, the apostles to the Apostles. For this reason, the myrrhbearing women, especially Mary Magdalene, are sometimes referred to as "equal to the Apostles."

Joseph of Arimathea was a disciple of Jesus, but secretly. (Note: John 19:38) He went to Pontius Pilate and asked for the body of Jesus and, together with Nicodemus, hurriedly prepared the body for burial. He donated his own new tomb for the burial. A native of Arimathea, he was apparently a man of wealth, and probably a member of the Sanhedrin. Sanhedrin is the way the New Testament Greek: bouleutēs, lit. 'counselor', is often interpreted in Matthew 27:57. (Note: Matthew 27:57) and Luke 23:50. (Note: Luke 23:50) Joseph was an "honourable counselor, who waited" (or "was searching") for the kingdom of God. (Note: Mark 15:43) Luke describes him as "a good man, and just". (Note: Luke 23:50)

Nicodemus (Greek: Νικόδημος) was a Pharisee, first mentioned early in the Gospel of John when he visits Jesus to listen to his teachings; he comes by night out of fear. (Note: John 3:1–21) He is mentioned again when he states the teaching of the Law of Moses concerning the arrest of Jesus during the Feast of Tabernacles. (Note: John 7:45–51) He is last mentioned following the Crucifixion, when he and Joseph of Arimathea prepare the body of Jesus for burial. (Note: John 19:39–42) There is an apocryphal Gospel of Nicodemus that purports to be written by him.

== Names of the Myrrhbearers ==
The Myrrhbearers are traditionally listed as:

- Mary Magdalene
- Mary, the mother of James and Joses
- Mary, the wife of Cleopas
- Martha of Bethany, Sister of Lazarus
- Mary of Bethany, Sister of Lazarus
- Joanna the wife of Chuza, the steward of Herod Antipas
- Salome, the mother of James and John, the sons of Zebedee
- Susanna
- Joseph of Arimathea
- Nicodemus

There are also generally accepted to be other Myrrhbearers, whose names are not known.

== Liturgical references ==
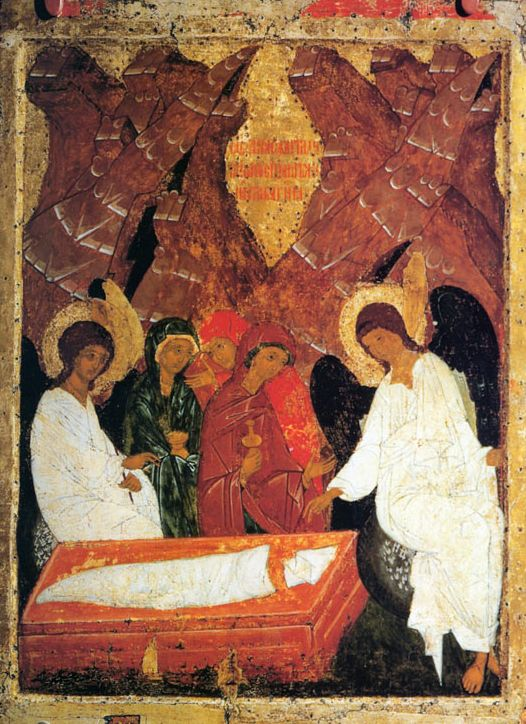
Icon used on the Sunday of the Myrrhbearers. The three Marys are in the center with the two angels at either side, in the foreground is the Holy Sepulchre with the winding sheet and napkin.

In the Eastern Orthodox and Greek Catholic Churches, the Third Sunday of Pascha (i.e. the second Sunday after Easter) is called the 'Sunday of the Myrrhbearers'. The Scripture readings appointed for the services on this day emphasize the role of these individuals in the Death and Resurrection of Jesus: Matins Gospel, Divine Liturgy, Epistle and Gospel. (Note: Scripture readings: Mark 16:9–20 (Matins Gospel); Acts 6:1–7 (Divine Liturgy Epistle); Mark 15:43–16:8 (Gospel))

Since this day commemorates events surrounding not only the Resurrection, but also the entombment of Christ, some of the hymns from Holy Saturday are repeated. These include the Troparion of the Day: "The noble Joseph ..." (but with a new line added at the end, commemorating the Resurrection), and the Doxastikhon at the Vespers Aposticha: "Joseph together with Nicodemus ..."

The week that follows is called the Week of the Myrrhbearers and the Troparion mentioned above is used every day at the Canonical Hours and the Divine Liturgy. The Doxastikhon is repeated again at Vespers on Wednesday and Friday evenings.

Many of the Myrrhbearers also have separate feast days on which they are commemorated individually in the Menaion.

There are numerous liturgical hymns which speak of the Myrrhbearers, especially in the Sunday Octoechos and in the Pentecostarion. Every Sunday, there is a special hymn that is chanted at Matins and the Midnight Office, called the Hypakoë, (Greek: Ύπακοί, Church Slavonic: Ўпаκои), which means 'sent', in reference to the Myrrhbearing women being sent to announce the Resurrection to the Apostles.

There are several prominent Orthodox cathedrals and churches named after the Myrrhbearers. They celebrate their patronal feast day on the Sunday of the Myrrhbearers.

In 2022, Joanna, Mary, and Salome were officially added to the Episcopal Church liturgical calendar with a feast day as the "myrrh-bearing women" on 3 August.

== Role ==
In the Gospels, especially the synoptics, women play a central role as eyewitness at Jesus' death, entombment, and in the discovery of the empty tomb. All three synoptics repeatedly make women the grammatical subject of verbs of seeing, clearly presenting them as eyewitnesses. The presence of women as the key witnesses who discover the empty tomb has been seen as increasing the credibility of the testimony, since, in the contemporary culture (Jewish and Greco-Roman), one might expect a fabrication to place men, and especially numerous and important men, at this critical place, rather than "just some grieving women." C. H. Dodd considered the narrative in John to be "self-authenticating", arguing that no one would make up the notion that Jesus had appeared to the "little known woman", Mary Magdalene. However, some passages in the Mishnah (Yebamoth 16:7; Ketubot 2:5; Eduyot 3:6) indicate that women could give testimony if there was no male witness available. Also, Josephus used women as witnesses to his claims. In addition, Paul does not mention the women. Bart D. Ehrman argues:

One of Mark's overarching themes is that virtually no one during the ministry of Jesus could understand who he was. His family didn't understand. His townspeople didn't understand. The leaders of his own people didn't understand. Not even the disciples understood in Mark—especially not the disciples! For Mark, only outsiders have an inkling of who Jesus was: the unnamed woman who anointed him, the centurion at the cross. Who understands at the end? Not the family of Jesus! Not the disciples! It's a group of previously unknown women ... the women at the tomb ...

All three Synoptics name two or three women on each occasion in the passion-resurrection narratives where they are cited as eyewitnesses: the Torah's required two or three witnesses (Note: Deuteronomy 19:15) in a statute that had exerted influence beyond legal courts and into situations in everyday life where accurate evidence was needed. Among the named women (and some are left anonymous), Mary Magdalene is present in all four Gospel accounts, and Mary the mother of James is present in all three synoptics; however, variations exist in the lists of each Gospel concerning the women present at the death, entombment, and discovery. For example, Mark names three women at the cross and the same three who go to the tomb, but only two are observed to be witnesses at the burial. Based on this, and similar examples in Matthew and Luke, Richard Bauckham argued that the evangelists showed "scrupulous care" and "were careful to name precisely the women who were known to them as witnesses to these crucial events" since there would be no other reason, besides interest in historical accuracy, not to simply use the same set of characters from one scene to another.

Mark's account (which is the earliest of the extant manuscripts) ends abruptly and claims that the women told no one. (Note: What happens once the Marys have seen the occupiers or the empty tomb is again a part of this narrative where there are variations: According to Mark, even though the man in the tomb instructs Mary Magdalene and Mary, mother of James and Joses, to inform the disciples and Peter, they flee in fear and do not tell anything to any man. Like Mark, Matthew presents the two Marys as being instructed by the tomb's occupant to inform the disciples, but unlike Mark's account they happily do so, and Peter has no special status amongst the others. Luke, again, merely presents Magdalene, Joanna, and Mary, mother of James and Joses—and other women that were with them—as telling the eleven and the rest, but presents them as doing so apparently without being instructed. John's account is quite different: John only describes Mary (Magdalene) as informing two people—Peter and the Beloved Disciple, an individual that is usually considered to be a self-reference by the author of the gospel John.) The Gospels of Matthew and Mark do not present any further involvement at the tomb. Luke describes Peter as running to the tomb to check for himself, and John adds that the Beloved Disciple did so too, the beloved disciple outrunning Peter. (Note: To answer the question of running speed: It is never explained why the disciples moved from merely traveling to running, and it has often been speculated that running only occurred on the last stretch once the tomb had come within sight. John Calvin instead speculated that the rush was due to religious zeal. In particular, John describes the Beloved Disciple as outracing Peter, though waiting for Peter to arrive before entering the tomb, with some scholars seeing the out-racing as a metaphoric elevation of the Beloved Disciple above Peter. However, many Christian scholars object to this interpretation, instead arguing that since the Beloved Disciple is usually interpreted as a reference to the author of John, it would be necessary for him to be considerably younger than Peter, and hence his speed could be due simply to youthful vigour. Another question is why John the Beloved Disciple pauses outside the tomb. While many view it as being due to his not wanting to violate death ritual by entering a tomb, in contrast to Peter who has no such qualm and instead enters immediately, most scholars believe John is simply deferring to Peter, particularly since the Beloved Disciple enters the tomb once Peter is inside. There is some scriptural variation as to whom the women told and in what order.)

== See also ==
- Life of Jesus in the New Testament
- Saintes-Maries-de-la-Mer
- The Three Marys
- Bereavement in Judaism
- Holy anointing oil
