= Susanna (disciple) =

Follower of Jesus

Saint Susanna
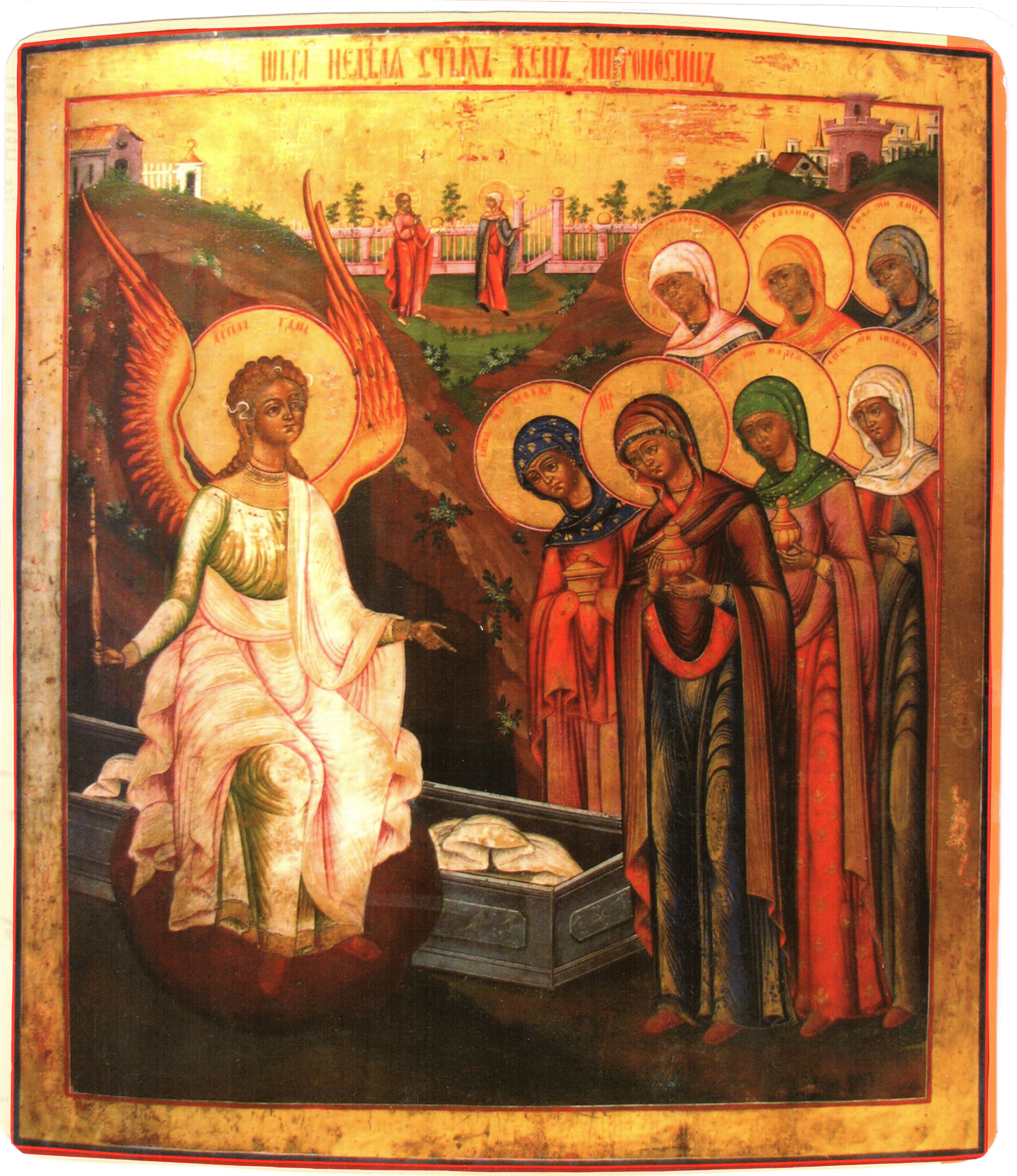
- Women in the Resurrection, icon Russian 17th or 18th century

Myrrhbearer
- Venerated in: Catholic church and Eastern Christianity
- Canonized: Pre-congregation
- Feast: on 'Sunday of the Myrrh-bearers', the 3rd Sunday of Pascha (Orthodox and Eastern Catholic)

Susanna (/suːˈzænə/ soo-ZAN-ə; Ancient Greek: Σουσάννα, romanized: Sousánna, originated from Hebrew שושנה "Shoshana") is one of the women associated with the ministry of Jesus of Nazareth. The name Susanna means "Lily".

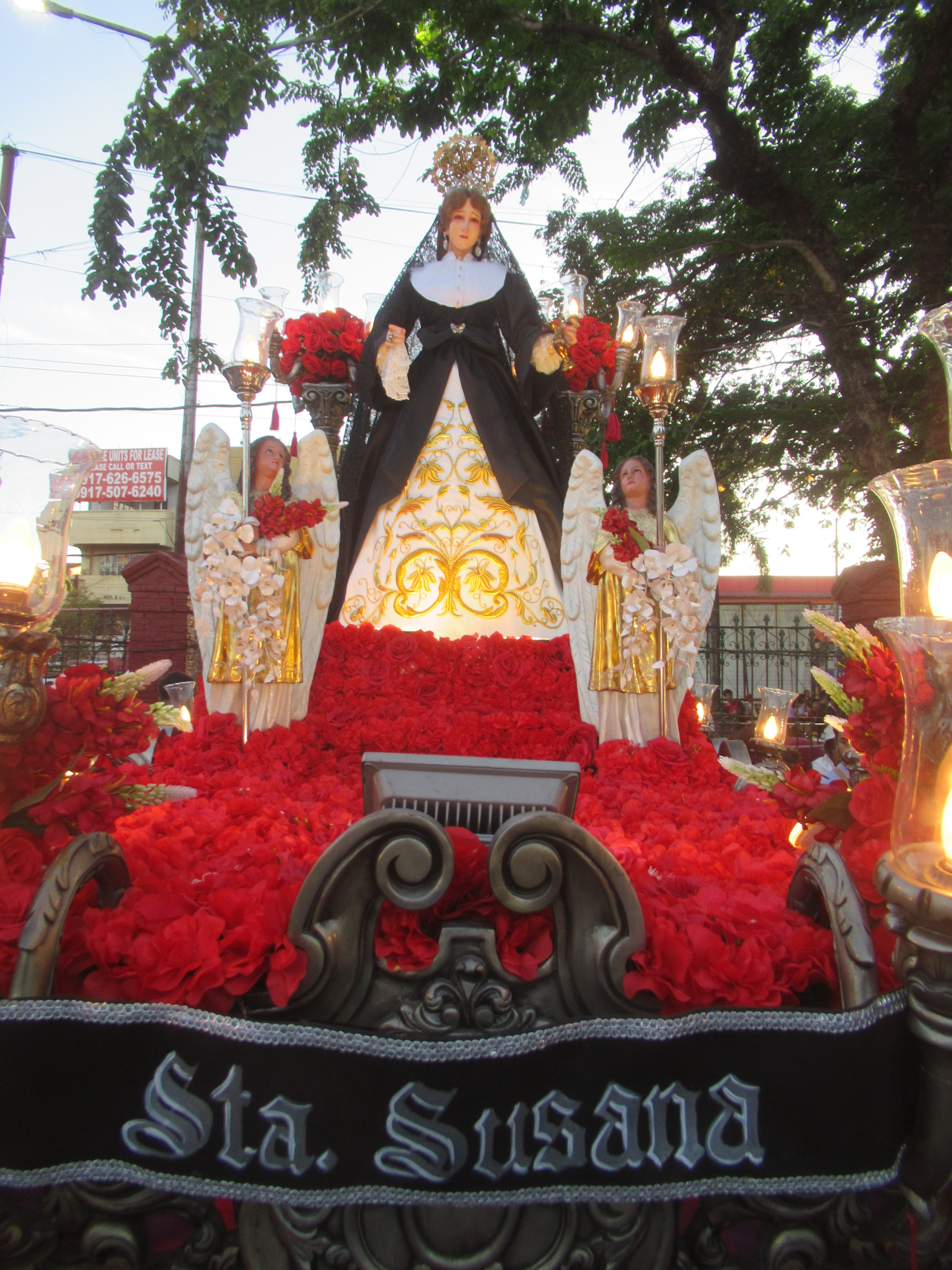
Saint Susanna, Myrrhbearer

== Susanna in the Gospels ==
Susanna is among the women listed in Luke 8 (8:1–3) as being one of the women who has been "cured of evil spirits and diseases" and provided for Jesus out of their resources.

And Joanna the wife of Chuza, Herod's steward; and Susanna, and many others, which ministered unto him of their substance.

— Luke 8:3

== Holy Myrrhbearer traditions ==
The Eastern Orthodox Church include Susanna in the List of Myrrhbearers the female disciples of Jesus who came to his tomb to anoint his body with myrrh oils but found the tomb empty.

Although Susanna is not included in the Old and Revised Roman Martyrology, she is still venerated as a Saint by the Eastern Rites of the Catholic Church. She is often confused with Saint Susanna, a third century Christian martyr.

== See also ==
- The Three Marys
- Women in the Bible
