= Uncial 0184 =

- New Testament manuscript
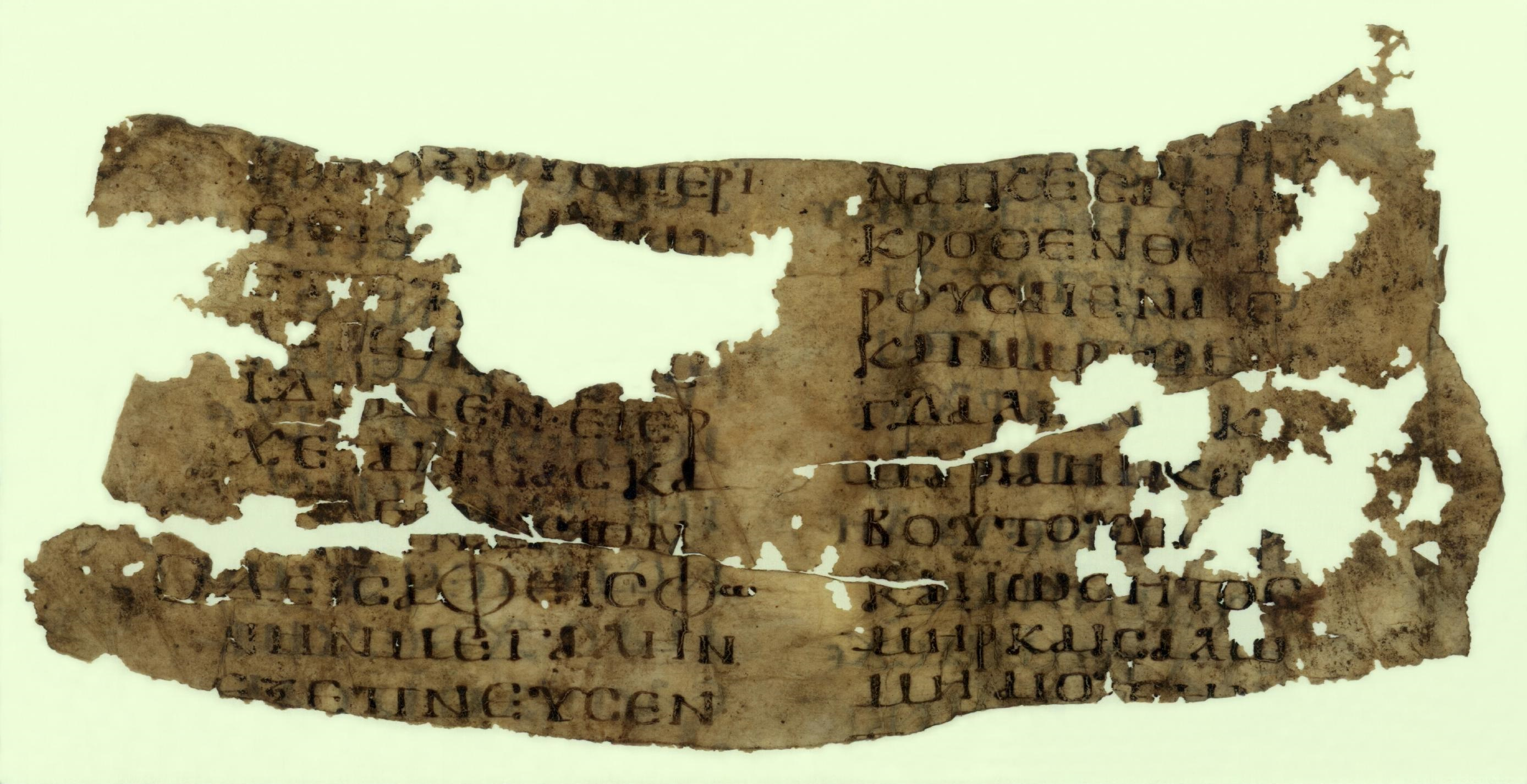
- Mark 15:36–37.40-41
- Name: Vindobonensis Pap. K. 8662
- Text: Mark 15:36-37,40-41
- Date: 6th century
- Script: Greek-Coptic
- Now at: Papyrus Collection of the Austrian National Library
- Size: 29 x 23 cm
- Type: Alexandrian text-type
- Category: II

Uncial 0184 (in the Gregory-Aland numbering) is a Greek-Coptic diglot uncial manuscript of the New Testament, dated paleographically to the 6th century.

== Description ==
The codex contains segments of the Gospel of Mark 15:36-37,40-41, on one parchment leaf (29 cm by 23 cm). It is written in two columns per page, 23 lines per page, in uncial letters.

The Greek text of this codex is a representative of the Alexandrian text-type, with many singular omissions. Aland placed it in Category II.

Currently it is dated by the INTF to the 6th century.

The codex currently is housed at the Papyrus Collection of the Austrian National Library (Pap. K. 8662) in Vienna.

== See also ==
- List of New Testament uncials
- Coptic versions of the Bible
- Mark 15
