= Luke 23 =

- ← chapter 22 chapter 24 →
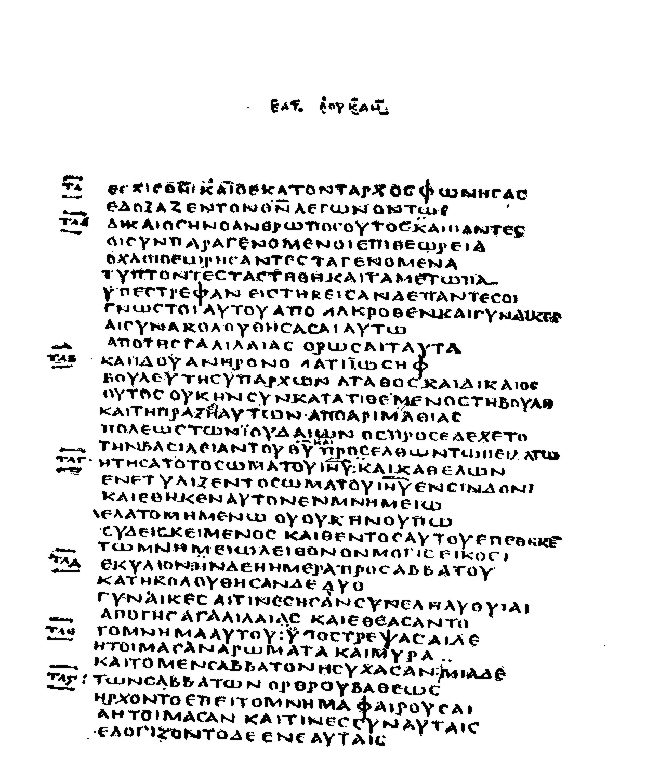
- The Greek text of Luke 23:47–24:1 on Codex Bezae (Cambridge University Library MS. Nn.2.41), written about AD 400
- Book: Gospel of Luke
- Category: Gospel
- Christian Bible part: New Testament
- Order in the Christian part: 3

Luke 23 is the twenty-third chapter of the Gospel of Luke in the New Testament of the Christian Bible. Early Christian tradition uniformly affirmed that Luke the Evangelist composed this Gospel as well as the Acts of the Apostles. Scholarly opinion on the tradition was evenly divided at the end of the 20th century.This chapter records the trial of Jesus Christ before Pontius Pilate, Jesus' meeting with Herod Antipas, and his crucifixion, death and burial.

== Text ==
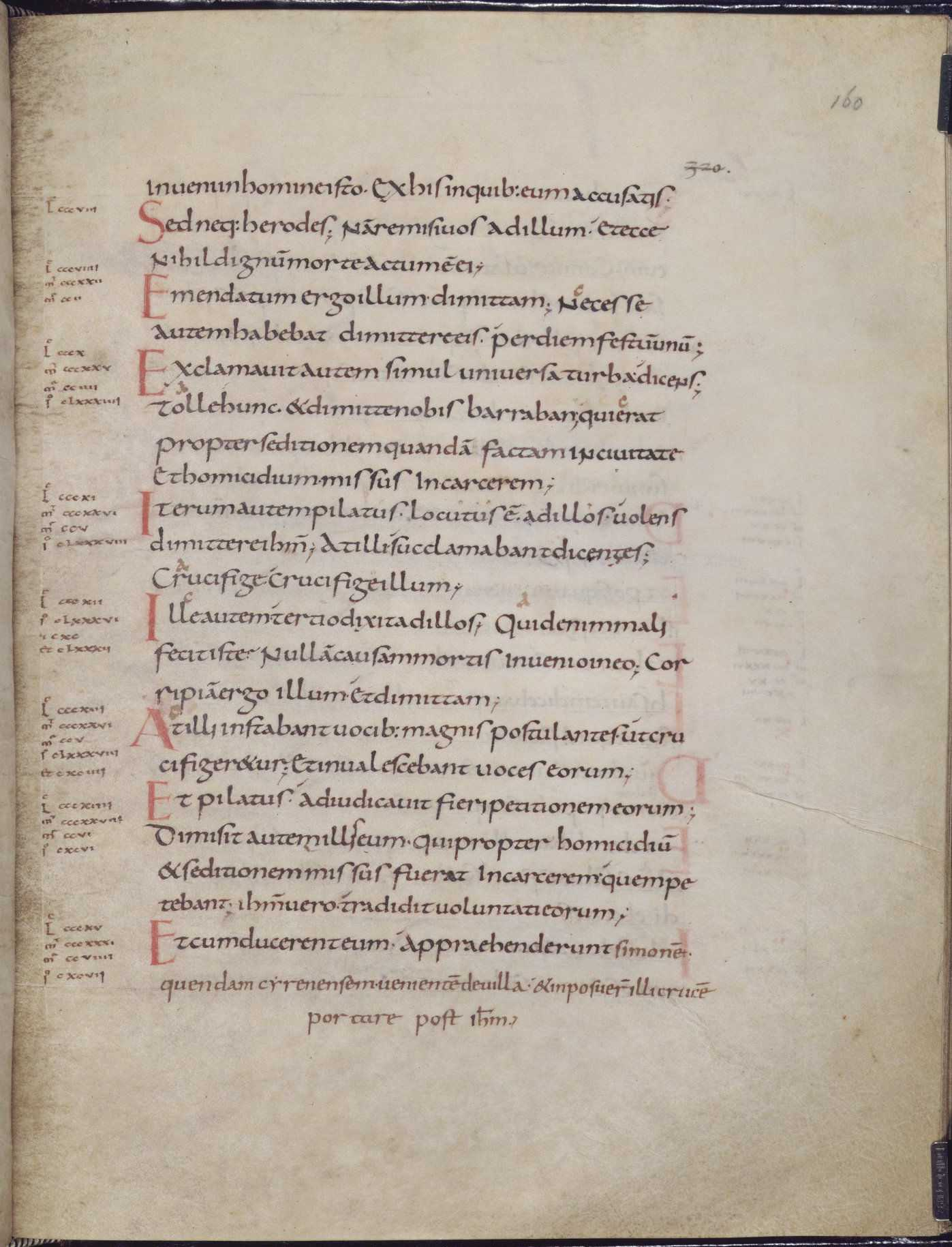
Luke 23:14–26 from a Gospel Book (folio 160v; British Library, MS Add. 11848) written in Carolingian minuscule

The original text was written in Koine Greek. Some early manuscripts containing the text of this chapter are:

- Papyrus 75 (AD 175–225)
- Codex Vaticanus (325–350)
- Codex Sinaiticus (330–360)
- Codex Bezae (c. 400)
- Codex Washingtonianus (c. 400)
- Codex Alexandrinus (400–440)
- Codex Ephraemi Rescriptus (c. 450; extant verses 26–56).

This chapter is divided into 56 verses.

=== Old Testament references ===
- Luke 23:34: Psalm 22:18
- Luke 23:36: Psalm 69:21
- Luke 23:46: Psalm 31:5a
- Luke 23:49: Psalm 38:11a; Psalm 88:8

=== New Testament parallels ===
- Luke 23:1–5,13–25: Matthew 27:1–2,11–26; Mark 15:1–15; John 18:28–19:16
- Luke 23:26,33–43: Matthew 27:32–44; Mark 15:20–32;John 19:17–24
- Luke 23:44–49: Matthew 27:45–56; Mark 15:33–41; John 19:28–30
- Luke 23:50–56: Matthew 27:57–61; Mark 15:42–47; John 19:38–42

== Jesus before Pilate (verses 1-5) ==
=== Verse 1 ===
And the whole multitude of them arose, and led him unto Pilate.

"The whole multitude of them" (Greek: ἅπαν τὸ πλῆθος, hapan to plēthos) may also be translated as "the whole assembly", or "the whole Council". Luke uses τὸ πλῆθος (rather than το ὄχλος, to ochlos) to signify a multitude in number. They led Jesus to Pontius Pilate, the provincial governor (prefect) of Judaea.

=== Verse 2: the charges against Jesus ===
Irish archbishop John McEvilly notes that Luke provides more specific details of the charges against Jesus than either Matthew or Mark, who refer to "many charges" brought against him. There are three specific charges:

We found this man subverting our nation, opposing payment of taxes to Caesar, and saying that He Himself is the Messiah, a King.

McEvilly refers to a fourth charge mentioned in Pilate's letter to Tiberius, "that He practised magic, in virtue of which, He performed some miraculous wonders". For F. W. Farrar, the first charge, translated in the King James Version as perverting the nation, "had the advantage of being perfectly vague".

=== Verse 3 ===
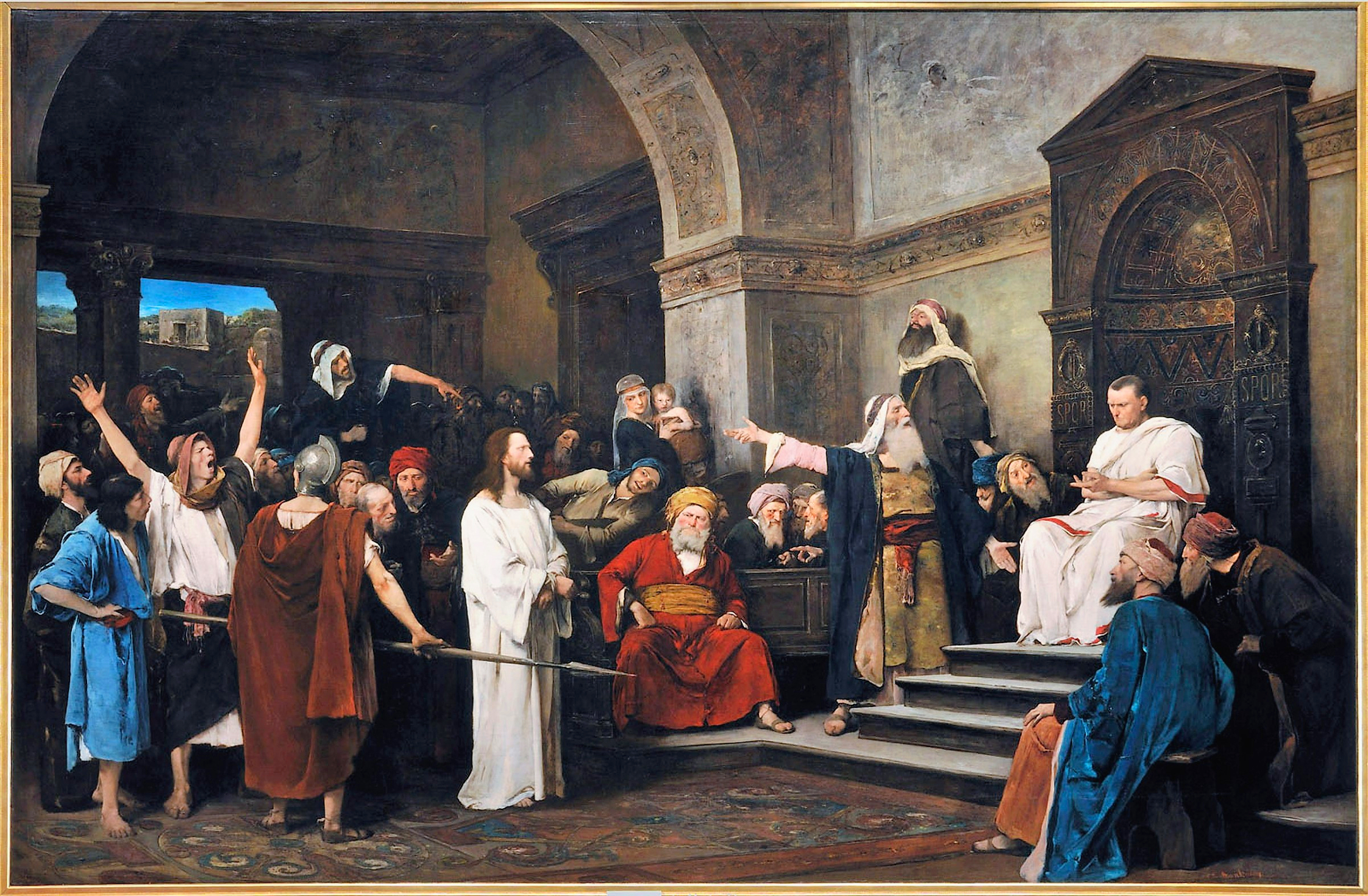
Christ before Pilate, Mihály Munkácsy, 1881

Then Pilate asked him, "Are you the king of the Jews?"
He answered, "You say so". (NRSV)

Cross reference: Matthew 27:11; Mark 15:2; John 18:37

==== Verse 3 in Greek ====
Textus Receptus/Majority Text:

ὁ δὲ Πιλάτος ἐπηρώτησεν αὐτόν, λέγων, Σὺ εἶ ὁ βασιλεὺς τῶν Ἰουδαίων;
ὁ δὲ ἀποκριθεὶς αὐτῷ ἔφη, Σὺ λέγεις.

Transliteration:

Ho de Pilatos epērōtēsen auton, legōn, "Su ei ho basileus tōn Ioudaiōn?":
Ho de apokritheis autō ephē, "Su legeis."

==== Verse 3 in Latin ====
Biblia Sacra Vulgata:

Pilatus autem interrogavit eum dicens tu es rex Iudaeorum
at ille respondens ait tu dicis.

The style of response is the same as in Luke 22:70, where Jesus answers the Sanhedrin's question, "Are you the Son of God?"

=== Verse 5 ===
But they were the more fierce, saying, “He stirs up the people, teaching throughout all Judea, beginning from Galilee to this place.”

Traditionally, "throughout all Judea" has been rendered as "throughout all Jewry". Farrar suggests that these words imply a "Judean ministry" which the synoptic gospels do not narrate, as the only journey of Jesus in Judea which is recorded is that from Jericho to Jerusalem, and William Robertson Nicoll also suggests that there might have been "more work done by Jesus in the south than is recorded in the Synoptists", although he counsels against basing any picture of Jesus' ministry on the inadequate testimony of his accusers. On the other hand, Judea has "sometimes been the name of the whole land, including apparently parts beyond the Jordan", see Josephus, Antiquities of the Jews, XII, 4.11, which term would therefore include the area of Perea east of the Jordan River. Matthew, Mark and John all refer to Jesus' stay in Perea, and Lucan scholars generally assume that the route Jesus followed from Galilee to Jerusalem passed through this region. The reference to Jesus' ministry "beginning from Galilee" relates back to Luke 4:14, where Jesus begins to teach in the synagogues there.

== Jesus meets with Herod (verses 6-12) ==
According to a passage which is unique to Luke's Gospel, responsibility for the interrogation of Jesus is transferred from Pilate to Herod Antipas. The editors of the Jerusalem Bible suggest that Luke may have obtained this information from Manaen, who according to Acts 13:1, "had been brought up with Herod the tetrarch".

== Jesus returns to Pilate (verses 13-25) ==
Herod finds no fault with Jesus (verse 15) and returns him to Pilate's jurisdiction.

=== Verse 14 ===
[Pilate] said to them, "You have brought this Man to me, as one who misleads the people. And indeed, having examined Him in your presence, I have found no fault in this Man concerning those things of which you accuse Him."

Luke's version of the trial scene "emphasizes Pilate's reluctance to act against Jesus".

=== Verse 22 ===
Then he said to them the third time, "Why, what evil has He done? I have found no reason for death in Him. I will therefore chastise Him and let Him go."

This "third time" of declaring Jesus' innocence follows the previous declarations in verses 4 and 14–15.

=== Verse 24 ===
So Pilate gave sentence that it should be as they requested.

This verse reads ο δε πιλατος επεκρινεν γενεσθαι το αιτημα αυτων in the Textus Receptus, matching the opening words of Mark 15:15, ο δε πιλατος ("so Pilate ..."), but the sentence begins καὶ Πιλᾶτος ... ("and Pilate ...") in critical texts such as Westcott-Hort. Pilate's "official decision" was to comply with the request of the crowd. The word ἐπέκρινεν (epekrinen, "pronounced sentence") is specific to Luke, although it also appears in the apocryphal 2 Maccabees 4:47, where innocent men are condemned to death.

== The way to Calvary (verses 26-32) ==
=== Verse 27 ===
And there followed him a great company of people, and of women, which also bewailed and lamented him.

Matthew's parallel passage, Matthew 27:34, notes that on his arrival at the place of his crucifixion, Jesus was offered wine mixed with gall to drink. Luke does not include this, a reference to Proverbs 31:6–7, Give strong drink to him that is perishing ..., but his reference to women in attendance en route may include their role in fulfilling this observance. Lutheran writer Johann Bengel suggests that the "bewailing" denotes their gestures and the "lamenting" reflects their vocal tones.

=== Verse 29 ===
"For behold, the days are coming in which they shall say, 'Blessed are the barren, and the wombs that never bore and the breasts which never gave suck.'"

The prophet Hosea spoke in similar language, when recognising that the disobedience of the Israelites required God's punishment, but calling for some mitigation:

Give them, O Lord —
what will you give?
Give them a miscarrying womb
and dry breasts.

=== Verse 31 ===
"For if they do these things when the wood is green, what will happen when it is dry?"

The green wood represents those who are innocent (referring to Jesus' condemnation to death), while the dry wood represents "the truly guilty".

== Verses 39–43 ==
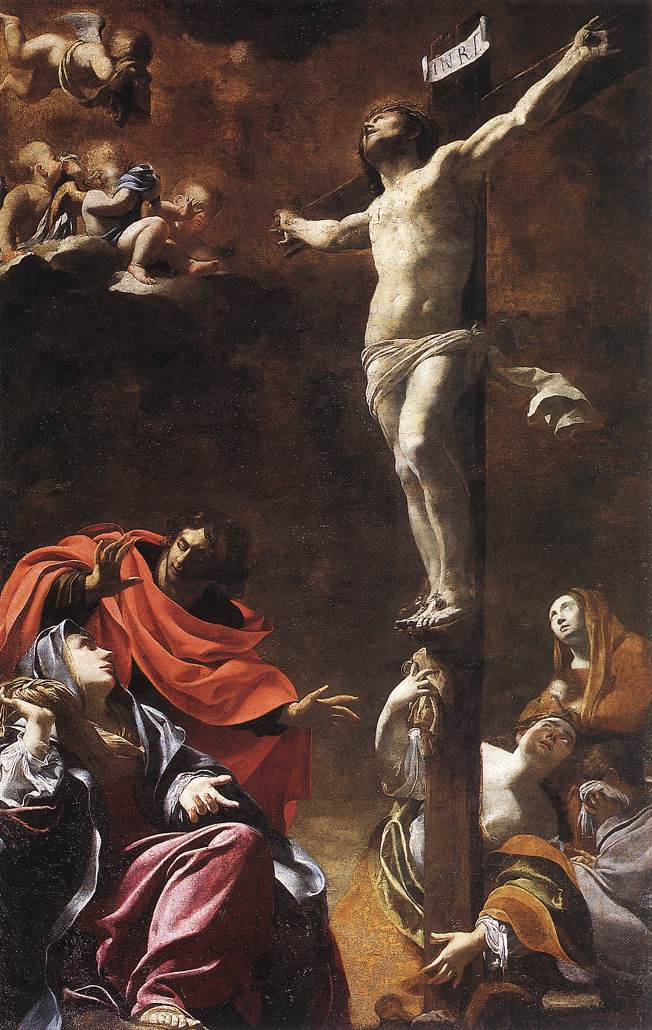
The Crucifixion (1622) by Simon Vouet; Church of Jesus, Genoa, Italy

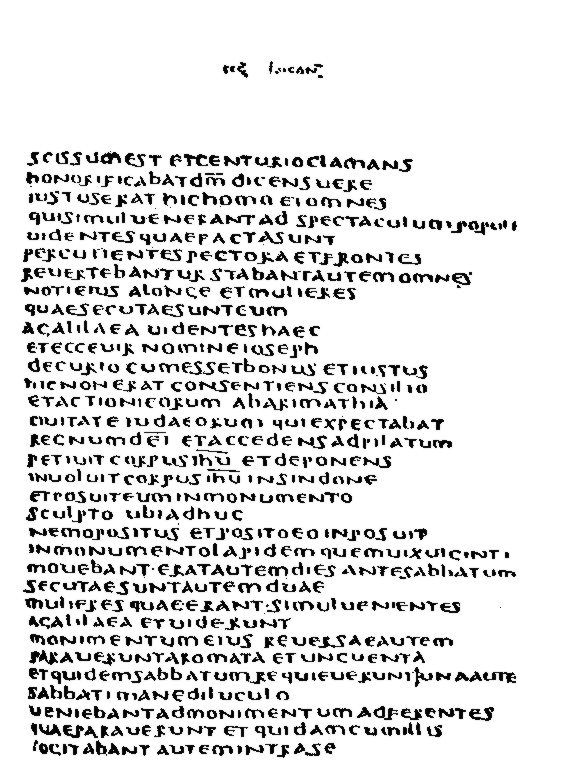
The Latin text of Luke 23:47–24:1 on Codex Bezae (Cambridge University Library MS. Nn.2.41; AD ~400)

One of the two thieves who die with Jesus reviles him, the other contemplates the justice of his own death sentence and appeals to Jesus to be "remembered" in the kingdom. The authors of the Geneva Bible (1599) note that the latter is "saved by faith".

== Verse 44 ==
Now it was about the sixth hour, and there was darkness over all the earth until the ninth hour.

Like Mark 15:33–34, Luke records three hours of darkness, which signify "the awesomeness of what is taking place".

== Verse 46 ==
And when Jesus had cried out with a loud voice, He said, “Father, ‘into Your hands I commit My spirit.’ ” Having said this, He breathed His last.

Jesus' crying "with a loud voice" is not, as in Mark 15:34, one of desolation (why have you forsaken me?), but of "secure confidence". Jesus quotes Psalm 31:5, rather than Psalm 22:1 which appears in Mark's gospel.

== Verse 48 ==
And the whole crowd who came together to that sight, seeing what had been done, beat their breasts and returned.

Nicoll understands the phrase "the things that had happened" (Greek: τὰ γενόμενα, tà genómena) "comprehensively, including the crucifixion and all its accompaniments". Albert Barnes refers to "the earthquake, the darkness, and the sufferings of Jesus" as the "things which were done". The earthquake is only recorded in Matthew's Gospel, but the third century historian Sextus Julius Africanus also refers to an earthquake on or around the day of the crucifixion.

== Verse 49 ==
And all his acquaintance, and the women that followed him from Galilee, stood afar off, beholding these things.

"The women" that followed Jesus from Galilee (also in Luke 23:55) were "Mary Magdalene, Joanna, Mary the mother of James, and the other women with them" according to Luke 24:10. Matthew 27:55 lists "Mary Magdalene, Mary the mother of James and Joseph, and the mother of the sons of Zebedee", whereas Mark 15:40 names "Mary Magdalene, Mary the mother of James the little and Joses, and Salome".

== Verse 55 ==
And the women who had come with Him from Galilee followed after, and they observed the tomb and how His body was laid.

According to Luke 24:10, "the women" (also in Luke 23:49) were "Mary Magdalene, Joanna, Mary the mother of James, and the other women with them". Matthew 27:61 lists "Mary Magdalene, and the other Mary", whereas Mark 15:47 names "Mary Magdalene, and Mary the mother of Joses".

== See also ==
- Burial of Jesus
- Crucifixion of Jesus
- Holy Week
- Jerusalem
- Ministry of Jesus
- Pontius Pilate
- Stephaton
- Related Bible parts: Psalm 22, Psalm 69, Jeremiah 15, Matthew 27, Mark 15, Luke 24, John 18, John 19

== Bibliography ==
- Bauckham, Richard (2017). Jesus and the Eyewitnesses (2nd ed.). Wm. B. Eerdmans Publishing. ISBN 9780802874313.
- Kirkpatrick, A. F. (1901). The Book of Psalms: with Introduction and Notes. The Cambridge Bible for Schools and Colleges. Vol. Book IV and V: Psalms XC-CL. Cambridge: At the University Press.

Preceded by Luke 22	Chapters of the Bible; Gospel of Luke	Succeeded by Luke 24
