= Mark 15 =

- ← chapter 14 chapter 16 →
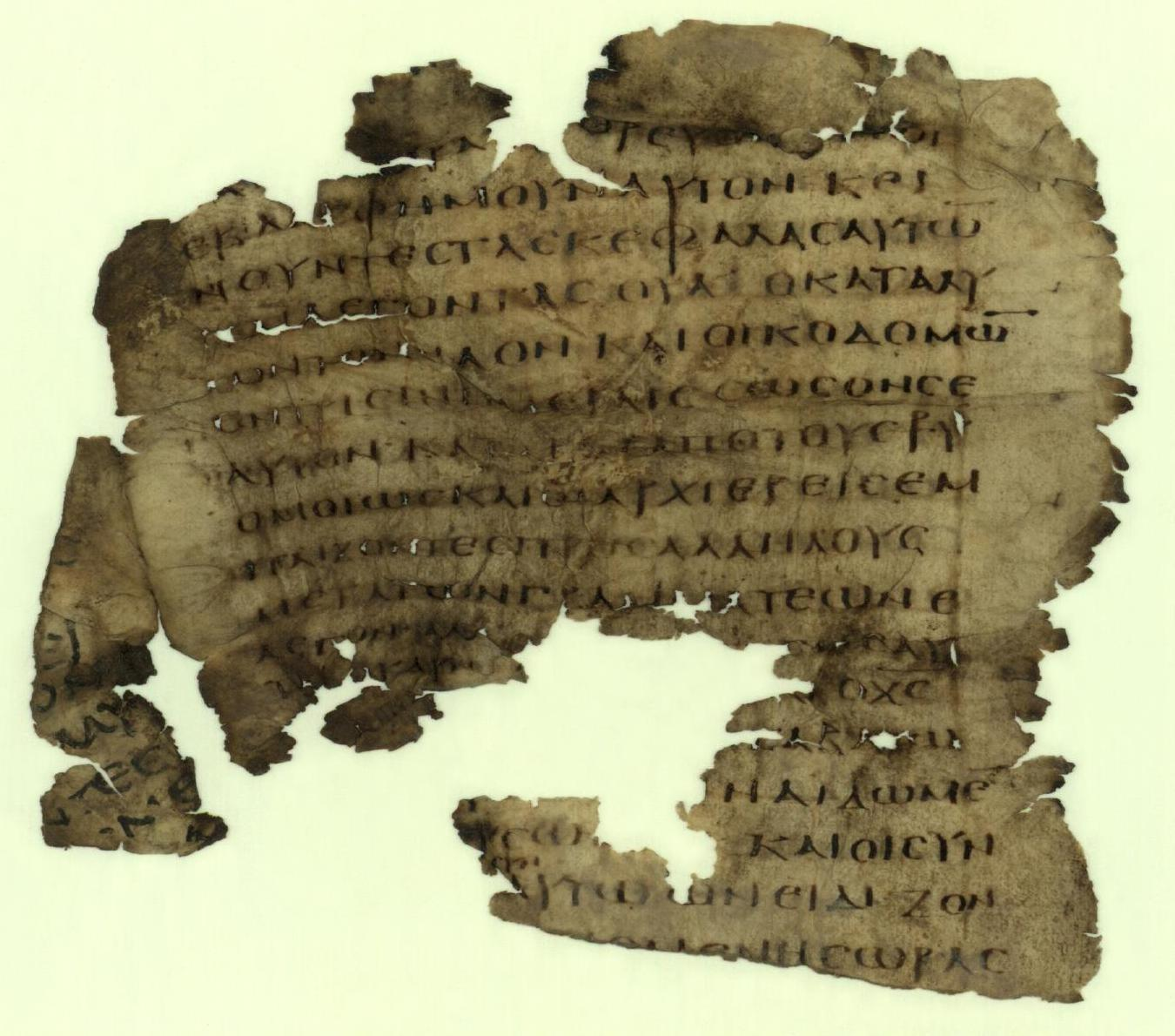
- Fragment of Uncial 059 (4th/5th century) showing Mark 15:29–33
- Book: Gospel of Mark
- Category: Gospel
- Christian Bible part: New Testament
- Order in the Christian part: 2

Mark 15 is the fifteenth chapter of the Gospel of Mark in the New Testament of the Christian Bible. This chapter records the narrative of Jesus' passion, including his trial before Pontius Pilate and then his crucifixion, death and entombment. Jesus' trial before Pilate and his crucifixion, death, and burial are also recorded in Matthew 27, Luke 23, and John 18:28–19:42.

== Text ==
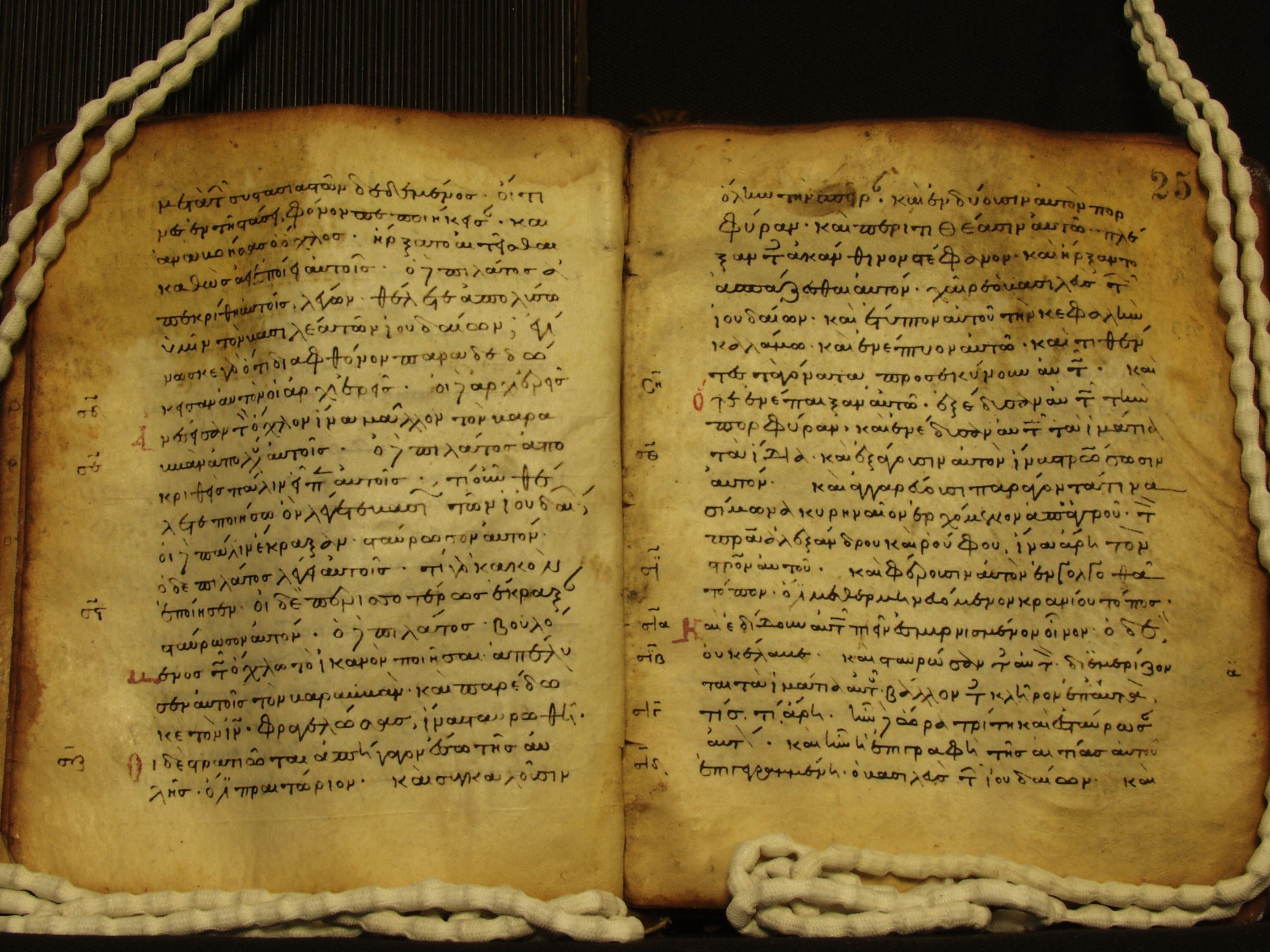
Mark 15:6–27 in minuscule script on two pages of Minuscule 2445 from the 12th century

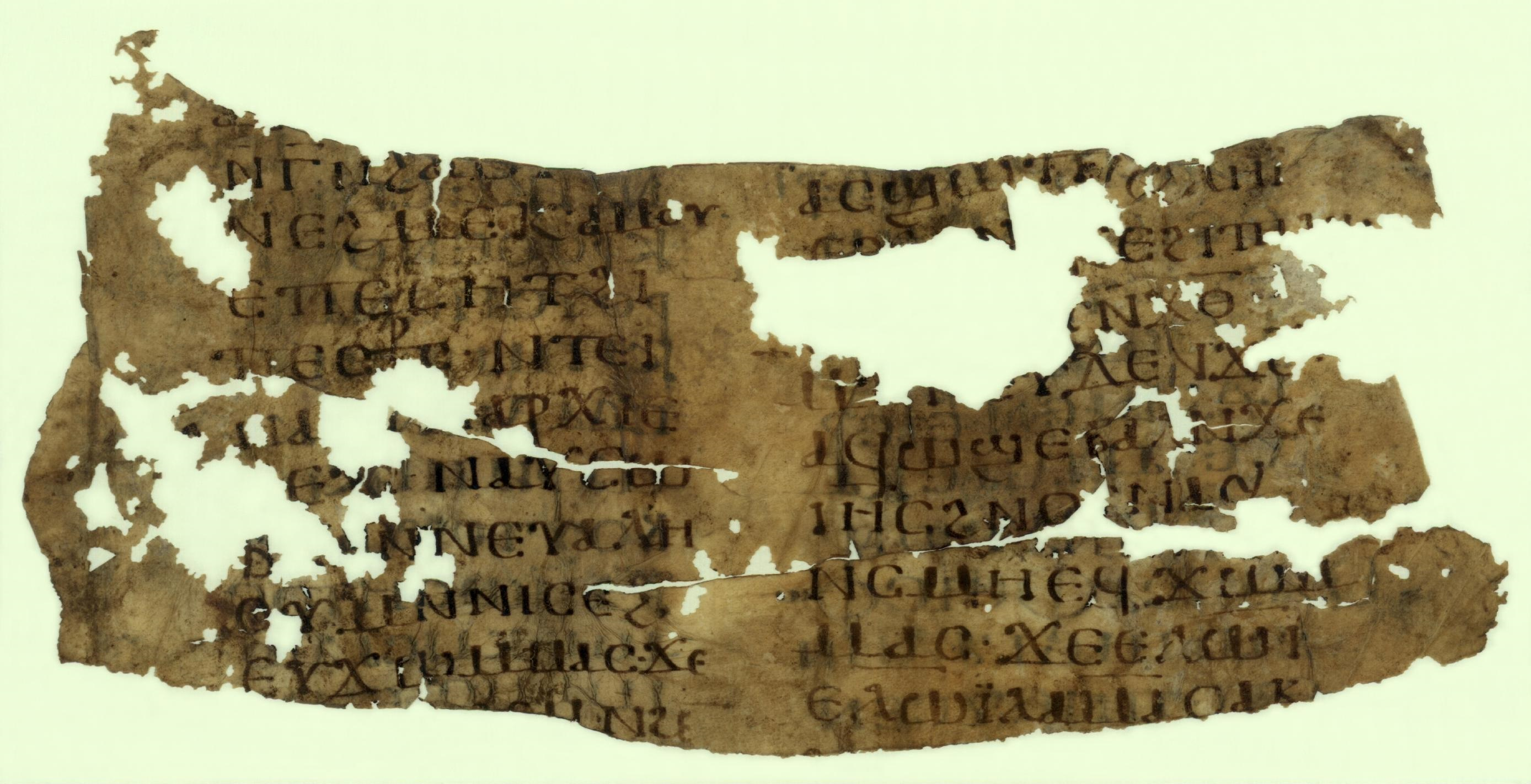
The Greek text of Mark 15:29–31,33–34 in uncial script on Uncial 0184 from the 6th century

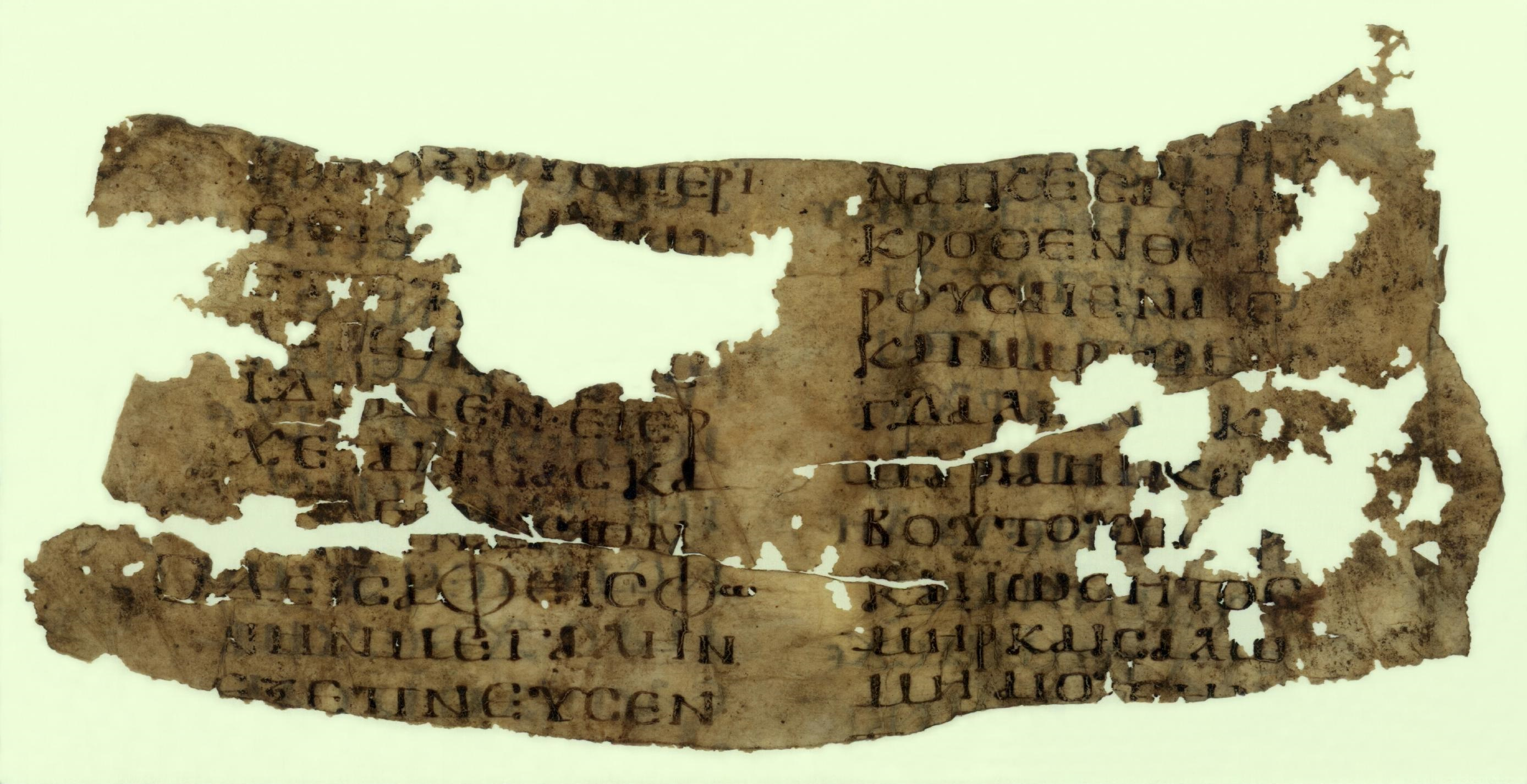
Mark 15:36–37,40–41in Greek-Coptic from Uncial 0184 (Vindobonensis Pap. K. 8662; 6th century)

The original text was written in Koine Greek. This chapter is divided into 47 verses.

=== Textual witnesses ===
Some early manuscripts containing the text of this chapter are:

- Codex Vaticanus (~325–350)
- Codex Sinaiticus (~330–360)
- Codex Bezae (~400)
- Codex Washingtonianus (~400)
- Codex Alexandrinus (~400–440)
- Codex Ephraemi Rescriptus (~450; complete)

=== Old Testament references ===
- Mark 15:24: Psalm 22:18
- Mark 15:29: Psalm 22:7
- Mark 15:34: Psalm 22:1
- Mark 15:36: Psalm 69:21

=== New Testament parallels ===
- Mark 15:1–15: Matthew 27:1–2,11–26; Luke 23:1–5,13–25; John 18:28–19:16
- Mark 15:16–20: Matthew 27:27–31; John 19:2–3
- Mark 15:20–32: Matthew 27:32–44; Luke 23:26,33–43; John 19:17–24
- Mark 15:33–41: Matthew 27:45–56; Luke 23:44–49; John 19:28–30
- Mark 15:42–47: Matthew 27:57–61; Luke 23:50–56; John 19:38–42

== Trial before Pilate ==
=== Verse 1 ===
Immediately, in the morning, the chief priests held a consultation with the elders and scribes and the whole council; and they bound Jesus, led Him away, and delivered Him to Pilate.

In the previous chapter, Mark has stressed that "all the chief priests, the elders, and the scribes", "all the council", had taken part in the overnight trial of Jesus. "As soon as it was morning", the council or Sanhedrin reaches a decision, and agrees to hand Jesus over to Pontius Pilate. Pilate was the Roman Prefect (governor) of Iudaea Province from 26 to 36, which was the Roman combination of Idumea, Judea and Samaria and did not include Galilee, which was under the jurisdiction of Herod Antipas. William Robertson Nicoll suggests that the "consultation" should be understood as the "resolution" resulting from the consultation, given that the whole council had been involved in the trial, and George Maclear suggests this was "a second and more formal meeting of the Sanhedrim" following the first, overnight, meeting.

According to Matthew, the Sanhedrin had decided to execute Jesus. Only the Romans were allowed to execute someone, not the local officials, according to John 18:31, yet Acts 6:12 records the Sanhedrin ordering the stoning of Saint Stephen and also James the Just according to Antiquities of the Jews (20.9.1), resulting in a rebuke from the Roman authority.

=== Verse 2 ===
Pilate asked him, 'Are you the King of the Jews?

He answered him, 'You say so.' (NRSV)

The Greek Textus Receptus/Majority Text reads:

καὶ ἐπηρώτησεν αὐτὸν ὁ Πιλάτος, Σὺ εἶ ὁ βασιλεὺς τῶν Ἰουδαίων;

ὁ δὲ ἀποκριθεὶς εἶπεν αὐτῷ, Σὺ λέγεις.

Cross references: Matthew 27:11; Luke 23:3; John 18:37

An interpretation is that Pilate is asking Jesus if he is the messiah, just as the high priest before in Mark 14:61, but with an explicit emphasis on the Messiah's political role, that of Jewish King. According to John's gospel, in response to Pilate's question Jesus has a short conversation with Pilate and then answers, "You are right in saying I am a king. In fact, for this reason I was born, and for this I came into the world, to testify to the truth. Everyone on the side of truth listens to me." Historically it is likely that perceived insurrection against Rome was for what Pilate executed Jesus. According to Mark 12:17, however, Jesus said one should pay the Roman tax and was thus not a revolutionary.

The 1985 Jesus Seminar reached the conclusion that the temple incident was the cause of the crucifixion.

=== Verse 3 ===
Then the chief priests accused him of many things, or
And the chief priests accused Him of many things, but He answered nothing.

The chief priests remain in attendance before Pilate and make several further, unspecified, allegations, "heaping accusations on Him". Nicoll surmises that the single accusation, that Jesus had declared himself king, was not sufficient to convince Pilate of any wrongdoing. Some sources state here that Jesus gives no reply, but these words do not appear in the "best manuscripts or versions". Pilate pushes him for one but he still remains silent, which amazes or surprises Pilate. According to Luke, Pilate at this point sent Jesus to Herod Antipas because Jesus, as a Galilean, was under Herod's jurisdiction. Herod was excited to see Jesus at first, but ended up mocking him and sending him back to Pilate.

=== Verse 4 ===
And Pilate again asked him, "Have you no answer to make? See how many charges they bring against you."

While Mark has Pilate highlight that there are multiple charges against Jesus, Irish archbishop John McEvilly notes that Luke's Gospel provides more specific details of the charges than either Matthew's gospel or Mark here: see Luke 23:2. Jesus does not respond to any of their accusations.

=== Release of Barabbas ===
According to Mark's account, it was a custom to release a prisoner at Passover, which was a celebration of freedom. No other historical record of the time records Pilate doing this, and he is known to have been cruel, for which he was eventually expelled from his post. (JA18.4.2) All the other Gospels however also agree with Mark on this tradition. Some theologians suggest that Pilate did this once or a few times or that the Gospels accurately record this tradition even though other sources fail to mention. The Jesus Seminar argued doing this during a volatile situation like this would have been unlikely.

According to Matthew, Pilate received a message from his wife that she believed Jesus was innocent because of a disturbing dream she had just had. He asks the crowd if they want the King of the Jews released to them because, according to Mark, Pilate knew the priests were envious of Jesus and so presumably wanted to free him without a fight with them.

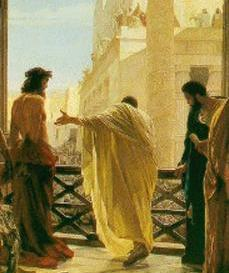
Ecce Homo (Behold, the Man!), Antonio Ciseri, 19th century: Pontius Pilate presents a scourged Jesus of Nazareth to onlookers.

The priests however convince the crowd to ask for the release of Barabbas, a prisoner. Mark says he was in prison chained "with" insurrectionists who had committed murder during a recent στασισ (stasis, a riot), probably "one of ... numerous insurrections against the Roman power". Theologian John Gill says he was "at the head" of the rebels. Both Luke and John say he was a revolutionary. Jesus seems to have already been declared guilty as this seems a choice between releasing two prisoners.

=== Verse 12 ===
Pilate answered and said to them again, "What then do you want me to do with Him whom you call the King of the Jews?"

Pilate might have asked what should be done "with Jesus", but in his choice of words, "him whom you call the King of the Jews", he may "have hoped that the sound of the title might have not been in vain on the ears of those who had lately cried, 'Blessed is the king that cometh in the name of the Lord'" when Jesus had arrived in Jerusalem.

The crowd reply that Jesus should be crucified, but Pilate asks what he is guilty of. They still demand he be crucified so Pilate turns Barabbas over to the crowd and has Jesus flogged and then sent out to be crucified. Matthew has Pilate washing his hands and declaring the crowd responsible, which the crowd accepts.

For his flogging Jesus would have been tied to a pillar, and hit with bone or metal studded whips. Crucifixion was a particularly shameful or unmentionable form of death, with a stigma put onto even the condemned's family.

Roman magistrates had wide discretion in executing their tasks, and some question whether Pilate would have been so captive to the demands of the crowd. Summarily executing someone to calm the situation however would have been a tool a Roman governor would have used.

== The soldiers mock Jesus ==
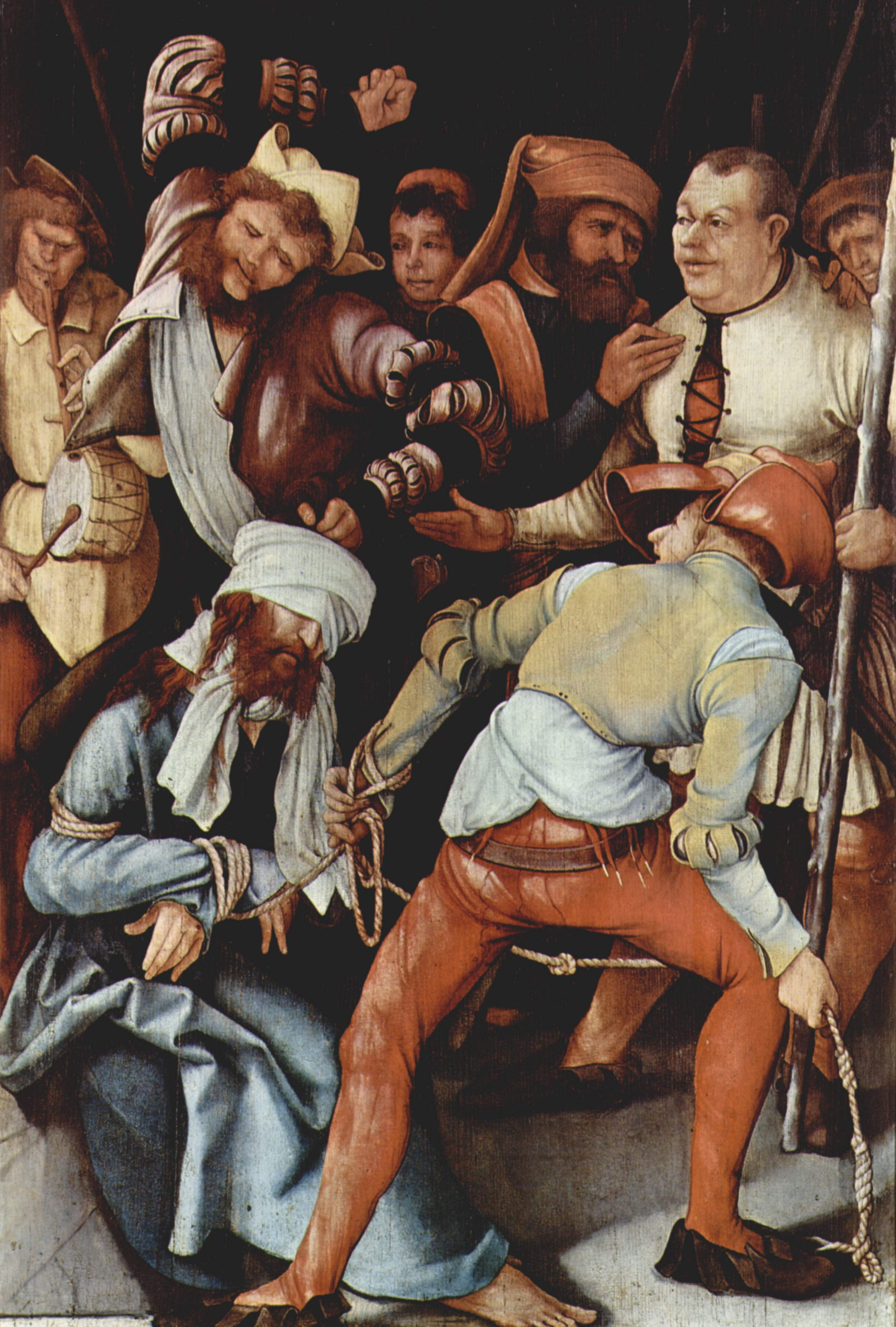
The Mocking of Christ by Grünewald

Mark says that the soldiers took Jesus to the Praetorium, either Herod's palace or the Fortress Antonia. They gather together all the other soldiers. The English Standard Version suggests that "the whole company" would have consisted of around 600 men, one tenth of a Roman legion. These were probably mostly recruits from the area of Palestine or Syria.

The soldiers put a purple robe on Jesus and put a crown of thorns on his head and mockingly hail him as the King of the Jews. They hit him in the head with a staff and pay false homage to him. According to Matthew they put the staff in his hand first before beating him with it. They dress him in his own clothes and take him out to be crucified. According to John they left his purple robe and crown on. Jesus is given the trappings of a King. Purple is a royal color. He wears a crown and is hit with a staff, also a royal symbol. Theologian Christopher Tuckett notes that "for Mark, what is said here in mocking jest is in fact profound truth. Jesus is the king of the Jews". The whole scene is colored with divine irony, as everything the soldiers do to mock Jesus' claim of being a King is used by Mark to show this, at the height of the Passion, as Jesus' crowning as messiah according to God's plan.

According to John's account, after the flogging Pilate brought Jesus back a second time and tried to convince the crowd that he was innocent, but the crowd still demanded Jesus' death and so then Pilate had him crucified. Luke has no account of the soldiers beating Jesus.

== Jesus' crucifixion ==
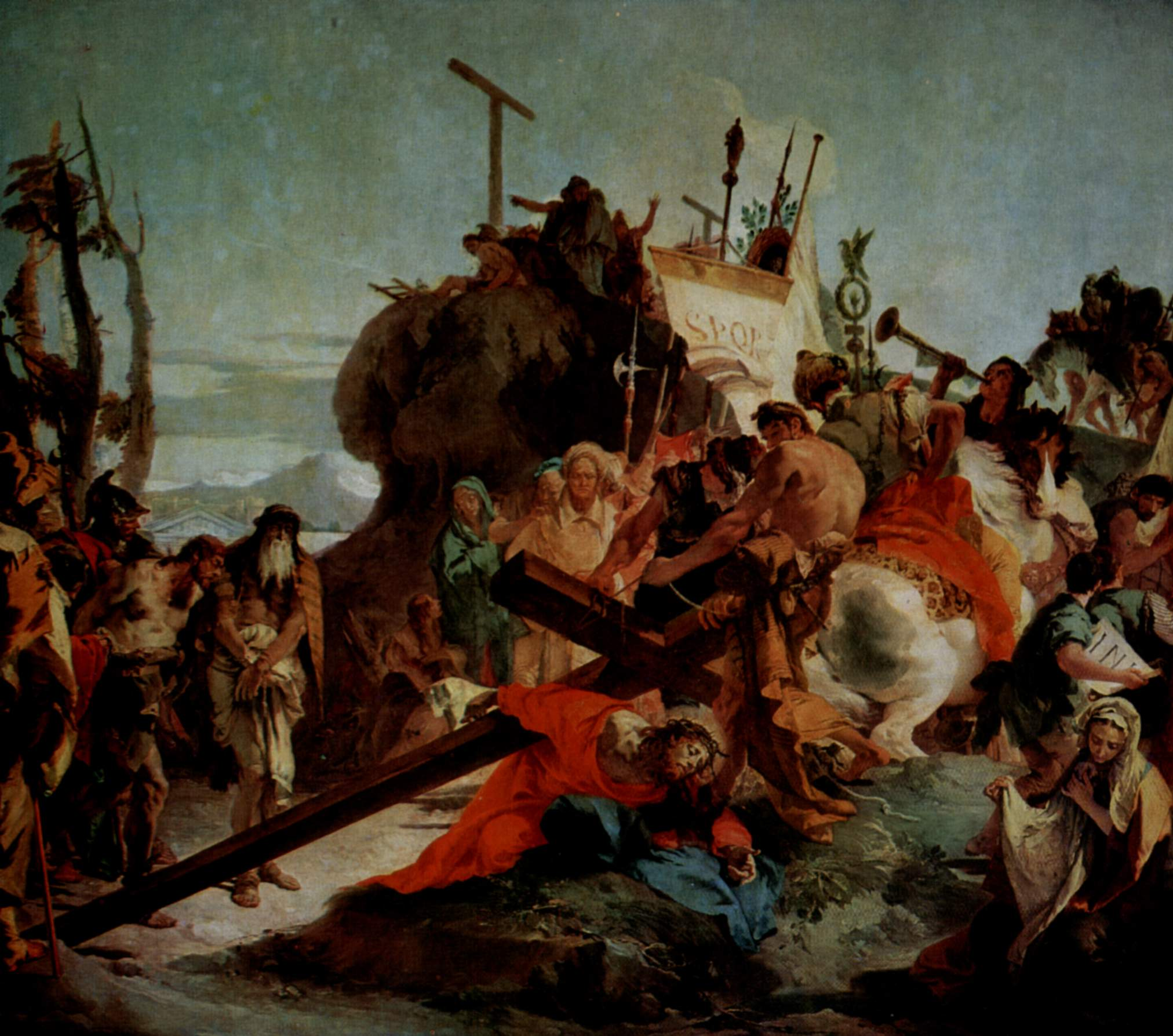
The Way of the Cross of Christ, Ascent to Calvary by Giovanni Battista Tiepolo

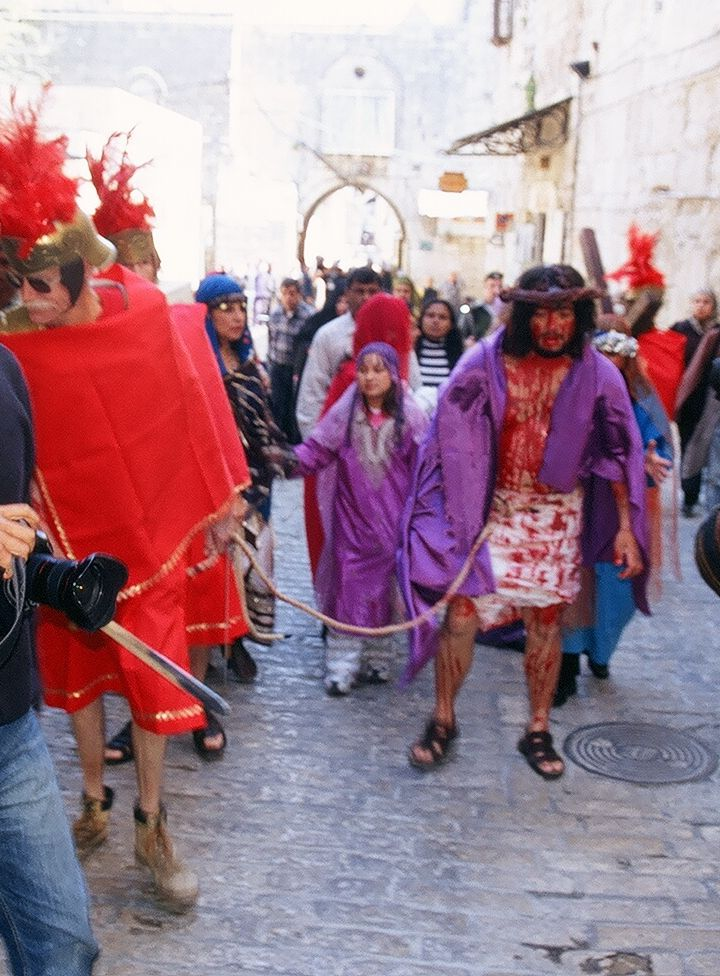
Reenacting the Stations of the Cross in Jerusalem on the Via Dolorosa from the Lions' Gate to the Church of the Holy Sepulchre.

A diagram of the Church of the Holy Sepulchre based on a German documentary, claimed to be the site of Calvary and the Tomb of Jesus

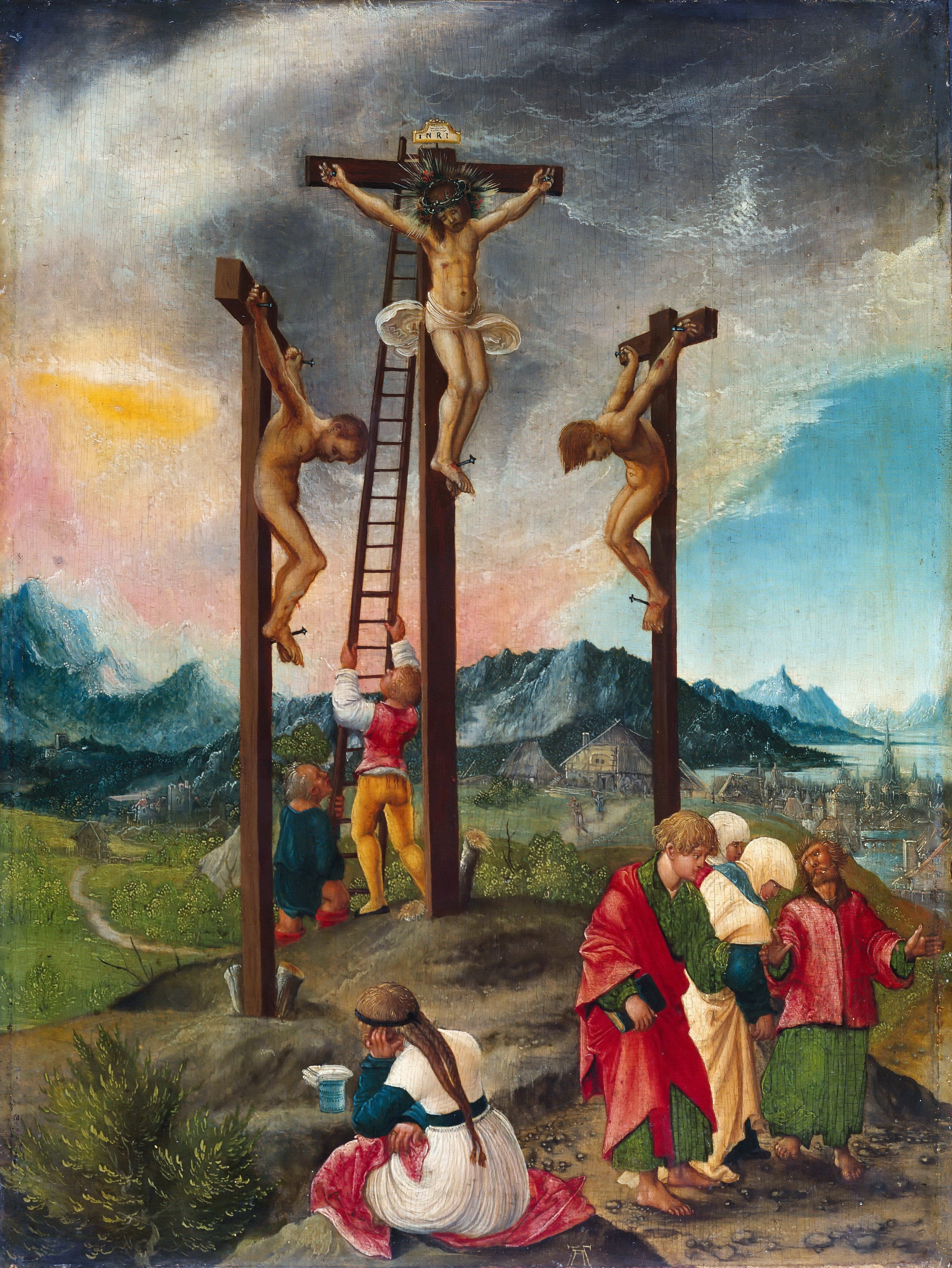
Crucifixion of Christ by Albrecht Altdorfer

On the way to their final destination the soldiers force a man passing by, Simon of Cyrene, to carry Jesus' cross for him, though Mark does not say why. Cyrene was in North Africa and Simon would have moved from there or would have been visiting. Mark lists his children, Alexander and Rufus.

=== Verse 21 ===
Then they compelled a certain man, Simon a Cyrenian, the father of Alexander and Rufus, as he was coming out of the country and passing by, to bear His cross.

That Mark takes the time to list only Alexander and Rufus as the names of Simon's children suggests they might have been Early Christians known to Mark's intended audience. Paul also lists a Rufus in Romans 16:13. A burial cave in the Kidron Valley discovered in 1941 by E. L. Sukenik, belonging to Cyrenian Jews and dating before AD 70, was found to have an ossuary inscribed twice in Greek "Alexander son of Simon". It cannot, however, be certain that this refers to the same person.

Luke has Jesus talking to some of his women followers along the way.

They arrive at Golgotha, which Mark says means the place of the skull. This was probably an exhausted rock quarry whose remaining rock had been damaged in an earthquake.

They offer Jesus wine laced with myrrh to lessen the pain, but he refuses. Mark then simply says they crucified him. They then take his clothes and draw lots to distribute them. Maclear suggests that they are "unconsciously fulfilling" the words of Psalm 22:18,

They divide My garments among them,
And for My clothing they cast lots

which John actually quotes as a fulfillment of prophecy.

According to Mark, it was the "third hour" when Jesus was crucified. This would be the third hour of daylight, or about 9:00 am. John however says Jesus was condemned to death around the sixth hour, or noon. The charge listed on Jesus' cross is "THE KING OF THE JEWS" (INRI). According to John, the chief priests complained to Pilate about this but he refused to change the charge.

Two robbers were also crucified, one on each side of him, and according to Mark, both of them mocked Jesus, even when they were in their processes of death. Luke reports the robbers' conversation with Jesus. People come by and insult Jesus and mock him for claiming he would destroy and then rebuild Herod's Temple in three days, which Jesus has not said so far in Mark but was falsely accused of claiming to destroy the "man-made" Temple and rebuilt it in three days in Mark 14:57–58. The chief priests are also there and say that if he is really the Christ then he should be able to come down from the cross and save himself as he had saved others, a reference to his many miracles earlier in Mark.

Mark relates these two mockings to perhaps highlight the question of why, if Jesus is indeed the messiah, can he not save himself from being put to death. Mark refutes these two charges later when Jesus rebuilds the Temple of his body and not only overcomes the cross but death itself in Mark 16. Mark might be stressing that if one follows Jesus, who Mark believes is the messiah, then one can expect help from God, such as Jesus' miracles, but one will not be saved from the pains of this world, and indeed in some way they are necessary to achieve a greater goal as Jesus' death is necessary for his role as the messiah.

== The death of Jesus ==
According to Mark:

=== Verses 33–39 ===
And when the sixth hour was come, there was darkness over the whole land until the ninth hour. And at the ninth hour Jesus cried with a loud voice, saying, Eloi, Eloi, lama sabachthani? which is, being interpreted, My God, my God, why hast thou forsaken me? And some of them that stood by, when heard it, said, Behold, he calleth Elias. And one ran and filled a spunge full of vinegar, and put it on a reed, and gave him to drink, saying, Let alone; let us see whether Elias will come to take him down. And Jesus cried with a loud voice, and gave up his spirit. And the veil of the temple was rent in twain from the top to the bottom. And when the centurion, which stood over against him, saw that he so cried out, and gave up the ghost, he said, Truly this man was the Son of God.

The soldier might be recognizing something that no one else could and thus vindicating Jesus, or he might be saying this sarcastically. This statement may bring the Gospel full circle to Mark 1:1 where Jesus is identified by the writer as "the Son of God" (only in some versions, see Mark 1 for details). Luke records that he said that Jesus was a righteous man. Matthew adds that at the moment of Jesus' death tombs in Jerusalem were opened and many bodies of "the saints" were raised from the dead. They were seen subsequently in the "holy city," Jerusalem, by many (Matthew 27:53–54).

The veil of the Temple was the barrier between the inner Temple, thought to be God's place on Earth, and the rest. Its destruction is a vindication of Jesus. This might be a metaphor for God now no longer being separated but free for all the world. Given the imagery of the temple veil (there were cherubim woven into it, like the cherub set as guard over the entrance to Eden after Adam and Eve were cast out) as a symbol of the barrier between the Holy God and sinful men, the rending of the veil indicates a propitiation of God's wrath.

According to John, Jesus' mother Mary and her sister Mary were there with the disciple whom Jesus loved and Jesus told the disciple to take Mary into his home.

It is notable that, according to Mark, it is only Jesus' women followers who are now still with him:

=== Verses 40–41 ===
^{40}There were also women looking on from afar, among whom were Mary Magdalene, Mary the mother of James the Less and of Joses, and Salome, ^{41}who also followed Him and ministered to Him when He was in Galilee, and many other women who came up with Him to Jerusalem.

Mary Magdalene has not been mentioned so far in Mark, and the other Mary is identified by Jerome as Mary of Clopas, the sister of Jesus' mother Mary. Salome was James' and John's mother. The fact that Mark has not explicitly related any of Jesus' interaction with them shows that Mark has left out many of the events of the life of the "Historical Jesus" and only related events he deems necessary to make his points about Jesus.

John says the soldiers were told to take down the bodies for the Sabbath and broke the other two men's legs but stabbed Jesus with a spear to make sure he was dead. John claims this is eyewitness testimony.

== Jesus' entombment ==
For the subject in art, see Entombment of Christ

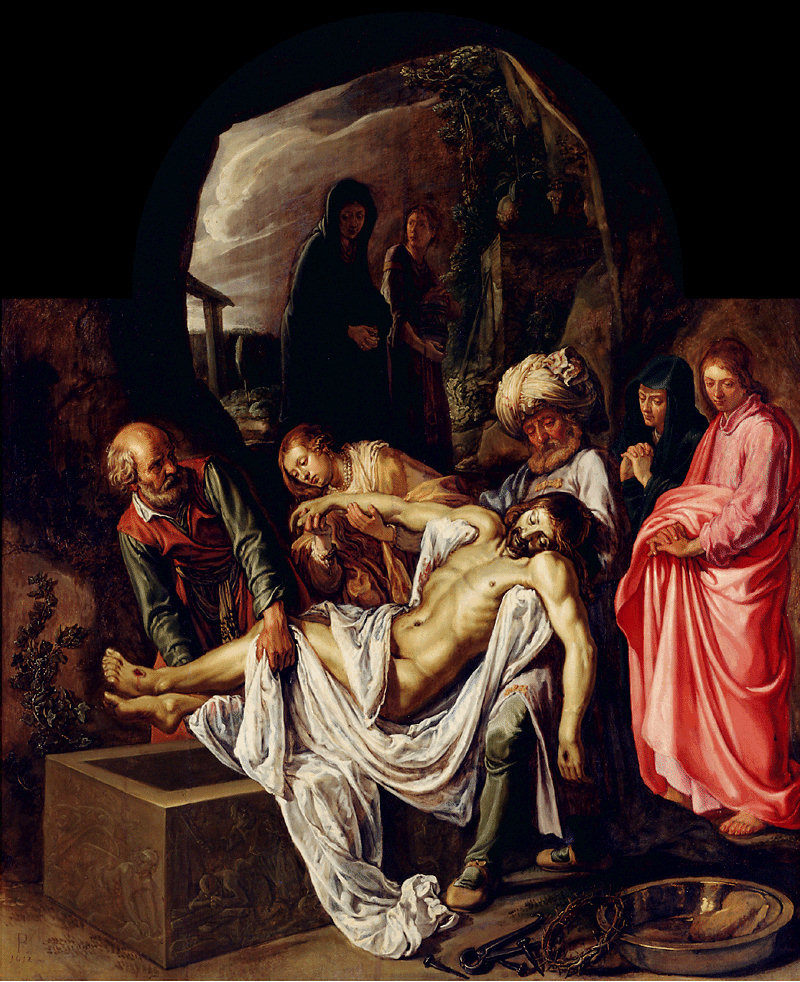
Entombment of Christ by Pieter Lastman

Evening is approaching and Joseph of Arimathea, a member of the sanhedrin, who was also waiting for the "Kingdom of God," goes to Pilate and asks for Jesus' body. The Scholars Version notes this as "unexpected .. Is Joseph in effect bringing Jesus into his family?" As the next day was the Sabbath Jesus would have to have been buried before sundown or then not until the next night. According to Mosaic law (Deuteronomy 21:22–23), if someone was hanged on a tree they were not to remain there at night. Pilate is surprised that Jesus has died so soon and asks for confirmation, and then gives Jesus' body to Joseph.

Joseph wraps it in linen and puts it in a sepulchre, rolls a stone over the entrance, and leaves. According to John, he was assisted by the Pharisee Nicodemus. The two Marys witness the burial, or at any rate the location where Jesus' body was buried: German biblical commentators Meyer and Weiss infer from the Greek perfect tense τέθειται (tetheitai, he was laid) that "the women were not present at the burial, but simply approached and took note where Jesus lay after burial". Bodies were normally anointed, but there seems to be no time here. John however says Nicodemus wrapped up Jesus' body with spices, which seems to indicate an anointing. The tomb, one of many around Jerusalem, was a limestone cave and Jesus' body would have been laid on a pre-cut shelf, and then most bodies would have been left for a year.

=== Verse 47 ===
And Mary Magdalene and Mary the mother of Joses observed where He was laid.

Maclear suggests reading this verse as "observed carefully".

== See also ==
- Crucifixion of Jesus
- Pilate's court
- Rufus (biblical figure)
- Stephaton
- Related Bible parts: Matthew 27, Luke 23, John 18, John 19, Romans 16

== Sources ==
- Brown, Raymond E. An Introduction to the New Testament Doubleday 1997 ISBN 0-385-24767-2
- Brown, Raymond E. et al. The New Jerome Biblical Commentary Prentice Hall 1990 ISBN 0-13-614934-0
- Kilgallen, John J. A Brief Commentary on the Gospel of Mark Paulist Press 1989 ISBN 0-8091-3059-9
- Kirkpatrick, A. F. (1901). The Book of Psalms: with Introduction and Notes. The Cambridge Bible for Schools and Colleges. Vol. Book IV and V: Psalms XC-CL. Cambridge: At the University Press.
- Miller, Robert J. Editor The Complete Gospels Polebridge Press 1994 ISBN 0-06-065587-9

| Preceded by Mark 14 | Chapters of the Bible; Gospel of Mark | Succeeded by Mark 16 |
