= Joanna, wife of Chuza =

Christian saint

Saint Joanna
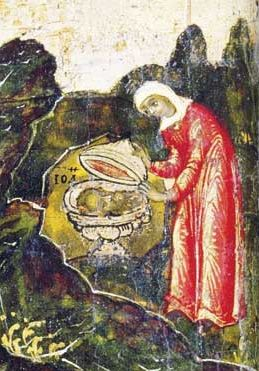
- Joanna and the Head of John the Baptist: Tradition holds she recovered the saint's head after Herodias had disposed of it.

Myrrhbearer
- Venerated in: Eastern Orthodoxy; Anglicanism; Catholicism; Lutheranism
- Canonized: Pre-congregation
- Feast: June 27; and 3rd Sunday of Pascha, the Sunday of the Myrrh-bearers (Eastern Orthodox and Eastern Catholic); May 24 (Roman-rite Catholic); August 3 (Lutheran)

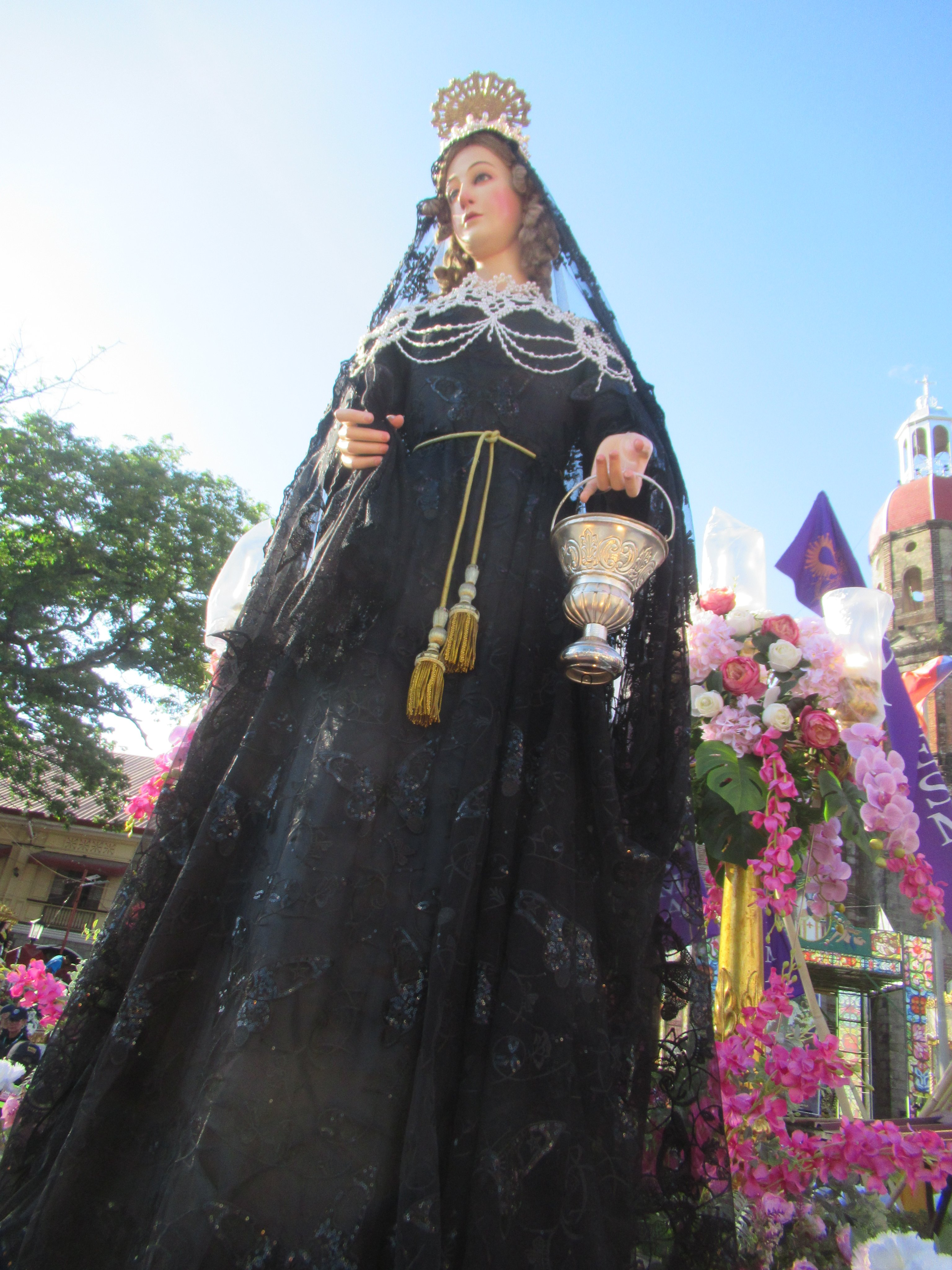
Joanna, wife of Chuza, in the Good Friday processions in Baliwag, 2024

Joanna (Koine Greek: Ἰωάννα, romanized: Iōanna, also Greek: Ἰωάνα), the wife of Chuza (γυνὴ Χουζᾶ), is a woman mentioned in the gospels who was healed by Jesus and later supported him and his disciples in their travels. She is one of the women recorded in the Gospel of Luke as accompanying Jesus and the twelve apostles and as a witness to Jesus' resurrection. Her husband was Chuza, who managed the household of Herod Antipas, the ruler of Galilee; this is the origin of the distinguishing epithet commonly attached to her name, differentiating her from other figures named Joanna.

Her name is from Hebrew: יוֹחָנָה, romanized: Yôḥānāh (transl. 'Yahweh has been gracious'). (Note: The name is etymologically related to Anna, Joanna sharing one of its elements with the Hebrew: חַנָּהיוֹחָנָה, romanized: Ḥannāh, lit. 'grace'. However, Joanna is not a compound formation and originated as a separate, unitary derivation, directly from the Hebrew male name Yôḥānān, 'John'.)

She is recognised as a saint in the Anglican, Catholic, Eastern Orthodox, and other Christian traditions.

== In the Gospels ==
Joanna is identified as "the wife of Chuza", steward to Herod Antipas, when she is listed as one of the women "cured of evil spirits and infirmities" who accompanied Jesus and the Apostles, and "provided for Him from their substance" in Luke 8:2–3. (Note: Luke 8:2–3)

In Luke 24:10, Joanna is mentioned by name, along with Mary Magdalene and Mary of Clopas, as among the women who took spices to Jesus' tomb and found the stone rolled away and the tomb empty. The accounts in the other synoptic gospels do not mention Joanna as one of the group of women who observe Jesus' burial and testify to his Resurrection.

== Holy Myrrhbearer traditions ==
In Orthodox tradition, she is honored as "Saint Joanna the Myrrhbearer" (Greek: Αγία Ιωάννα η Μυροφόρος) and is commemorated among the eight women who carried myrrh on the "Sunday of the Myrrhbearers", two Sundays after Pascha (Orthodox Easter). From this commemoration, in the revised Calendar of Saints of the Lutheran Church–Missouri Synod, she is commemorated as one of the Holy Myrrhbearers on August 3, together with other women present at the tomb of Jesus in New Testament accounts. These include Mary of Clopas (also called Mary, the mother of James the Less and Joses) and Salome.

Joanna is also commemorated in the liturgical calendar of the Episcopal Church of the United States on August 3, with one of the Lesser Feasts and Fasts of 2022, "Joanna, Mary, and Salome, Myrrh-Bearing Women".

== Significance ==
Although not mentioned by name, Joanna is seen as one of the women who joined the disciples and Mary, mother of Jesus, in the upper room in prayer. She was believed to be among the group of 120 who chose Matthias the Apostle to fill the vacancy left by Judas Iscariot, as well as being present on the Day of Pentecost.

In his book, Gospel Women, Richard Bauckham notes that in Luke 24, Joanna's name appears at the very center of a chiastic structure which is a literary device in an A-B-C-B-A pattern. The fact that Joanna's name appears at the center of a chiasm in this part of Luke's resurrection account indicates that for some reason, she was being presented as a centrally important character or witness. One possible explanation for this relates to the discovery of a first-century ossuary in Jerusalem belonging to a woman named "Joanna" who was the granddaughter of "Theophilus the high priest". If this is the same woman mentioned by Luke, her role as a key witness to the empty tomb could be explained by the fact that in Luke 1:3, he wrote to a "most excellent Theophilus", (Note: Luke 1:3) and as Theophilus's granddaughter, Joanna would have been someone Luke loved and trusted.

== Identification with Junia ==
Richard Bauckham argues for identifying Joanna, the wife of Chuza, with the Junia mentioned in Paul's letter to the Romans 16:7, "Joanna" being her Jewish name, and "Junia" her Roman. Joanna is mentioned as one of the members of the ministry of Jesus in the Gospel of Luke, travelling with him among the other twelve and some other women, city to city.

After this, Jesus traveled about from one town and village to another, proclaiming the good news of the kingdom of God. The Twelve were with him, and also some women who had been cured of evil spirits and diseases: Mary (called Magdalene) from whom seven demons had come out; Joanna the wife of Chuza, the manager of Herod’s household; Susanna; and many others. These women were helping to support them out of their own means.

— Luke 8:1-3

Joanna is also mentioned alongside Mary Magdalene and other women as those who first visited the tomb and found it to be empty, and it is to this group of women, including Joanna, that Jesus first appears and instructs to tell the disciples to meet him in Galilee in Matthew 28:8-10. (Note: Luke 24:10 mentions Joanna.) Bauckham notes that Paul describes Junia as having been a member of the Christian community prior to him, and given that Paul himself converted within three years of the death of Jesus, that would require Junia to have been a member of the community from a very early period.

Whereas Joanna is a Hellenized, Grecian, adaptation of a Hebrew name, Junia is a Latin name. Jews often adopted a second, Latin name that were nearly sound equivalents to their original name. Joanna and Junia act as near sound equivalents in the native languages, which Bauckham says is indicative of the identification between the two. Finally, Paul describes Junia as being "prominent among the apostles". Given that Junia is described as an earliest member of the community, and as one of the most prominent members, that she is not named elsewhere is indicative, as Bauckham argues, that she and Joanna are the same individual, given Joanna's high prominence during the ministry of Jesus.

== In popular culture ==
- Joanna, wife of Chuza (Ukrainian: Йоганна, жінка Хусова) is a verse drama by Ukrainian writer Lesya Ukrainka, first published in 1909.
- In the 2015 television miniseries Killing Jesus Rotem Zissman-Cohen plays Joanna.
- In the 2015 television miniseries A.D. The Bible Continues, Joanna is portrayed by Farzana Dua Elahe.
- Joanna is a fictional character in The Lost Wisdom of the Magi (2020), by Susie Helme, published by Conrad Press
- In the third season of the 2017 television series The Chosen, Joanna is portrayed by Amy Bailey. She is deeply moved by the Sermon on the Mount and helps Andrew meet the imprisoned John the Baptizer. In the fourth season she announces John's execution to the other disciples.

== See also ==
- Women in the Bible
- List of Christian women of the patristic age
- Theophilus ben Ananus
