= List of major biblical figures =

The Bible is a collection of canonical sacred texts of Judaism and Christianity. Different religious groups include different books within their canons, in different orders, and sometimes divide or combine books, or incorporate additional material into canonical books. Christian Bibles range from the sixty-six books of the Protestant canon to the eighty-one books of the Ethiopian Orthodox Church canon.

== Hebrew Bible ==
- Tubal-cain

=== Prophets ===
- Samuel
- Enoch

=== Kings ===
- David
- Solomon

=== Priests ===
- Aaron
- Eleazar
- Eli
- Phinehas

=== Tribes of Israel ===
According to the Book of Genesis, the Israelites were descendants of the sons of Jacob, who was renamed Israel after wrestling with an angel. His twelve male children become the ancestors of the Twelve Tribes of Israel.

- Asher
- Benjamin
- Dan
- Gad
- Issachar
- Joseph, which was split into two tribes descended from his sons:
  - Tribe of Ephraim
  - Tribe of Manasseh
- Judah
- Levi
- Naphtali
- Reuben
- Simeon
- Zebulun

== Deuterocanon ==
=== Maccabees ===
- Eleazar Avaran
- John Gaddi
- John Hyrcanus
- Jonathan Apphus
- Judas Maccabeus
- Mattathias
- Simon Thassi

=== Greek rulers ===
- Alexander the Great
- Antiochus III the Great
- Antiochus IV Epiphanes
- Philip II of Macedon

=== Persian rulers ===
- Astyages
- Darius III

=== Others ===
- Baruch
- Tobit
- Judith
- Susanna

== New Testament ==
=== Jesus and his relatives ===
- Jesus Christ
- Mary, mother of Jesus
- Joseph
- Brothers of Jesus
  - James (often identified with James, son of Alphaeus)
  - Joseph (Joses)
  - Judas (Jude) (often identified with Thaddeus)
  - Simon
- Mary of Clopas
- Cleopas (often identified with Alphaeus and Clopas)

=== Apostles of Jesus ===
The Thirteen:

- Peter (a.k.a. Simon or Cephas)
- Andrew (Simon Peter's brother)
- James, son of Zebedee
- John, son of Zebedee
- Philip
- Bartholomew also known as "Nathanael"
- Thomas also known as "Doubting Thomas"
- Matthew also known as "Levi"
- James, son of Alphaeus
- Judas, son of James (a.k.a. Thaddeus or Lebbaeus)
- Simon the Zealot
- Judas Iscariot (the traitor)
- Matthias

Others:

- Paul
- Barnabas
- Mary Magdalene (the one who discovered Jesus' empty tomb)

=== Priests ===
- Caiaphas, high priest
- Annas, first high priest of Roman Judea
- Zechariah, father of John the Baptist

=== Prophets ===
- Agabus
- Anna
- Simeon
- John the Baptist

=== Other believers ===
- Apollos
- Aquila
- Dionysius the Areopagite
- Epaphras, fellow prisoner of Paul, fellow worker
- John Mark (often identified with Mark)
- Joseph of Arimathea
- Lazarus
- Luke
- Mark
- Martha
- Mary Magdalene
- Mary, sister of Martha
- Nicodemus
- Onesimus
- Philemon
- Priscilla
- Silas
- Sopater
- Stephen, first martyr
- Timothy
- Titus

=== Secular rulers ===
- Herod Agrippa I, called "King Herod" or "Herod" in Acts 12
- Felix governor of Judea who was present at the trial of Paul, and his wife Drusilla in Acts 24:24
- Herod Agrippa II, king over several territories, before whom Paul made his defense in Acts 26.
- Herod Antipas, called "Herod the Tetrarch" or "Herod" in the Gospels and in Acts 4:27
- Herodias
- Herod the Great
- Philip the Tetrarch
- Pontius Pilate
- Salome, the daughter of Herodias
- Quirinius

==== Roman Emperors ====
- Augustus
- Tiberius
- Claudius

== See also ==
- List of biblical names
- List of burial places of biblical figures
- List of Jewish biblical figures
- List of minor biblical figures, A–K
- List of minor biblical figures, L–Z
- List of minor New Testament figures
