= Joses =

Given name

Joses (Ancient Greek: Ἰωσῆς) is a name, usually regarded as a form of Joseph, occurring many times in the New Testament:

- Joses, one of the four "brothers" of Jesus (Greek: ἀδελφοί, romanized: adelphoi, lit. 'brethren')
- Joses or Joseph, son of a Mary of Clopas and brother of a James (James the Less according to Mark 15:40), mentioned in Mark 15:40, Mark 15:47, and Matthew 27:56
- Joses or Joseph, the real name of Barnabas according to Acts 4:36
- There is also a Ἰησοῦ or a Ἰωσή (Jose, Joshua or Jesus) in Luke 3:29

== Etymology ==
Joses is a short Greek form of Joseph. Unlike Greek Joseph, however, which remains frozen as Joseph in all grammatical cases, Joses functions like a true Greek name and is declined in Greek, taking the ending -e/-etos in the genitive case, hence Jose/Josetos (Ἰωσῆ/Ἰωσῆτος), 'of Joses'.

Although spelling of Joseph is fairly constant in Greek, spellings of the short forms Joses and Josis vary. Tal Ilan's catalogue of Jewish name inscriptions of the period (2002) notes variation in the spelling of "Joseph" (indeclinable in Greek) and various shorter (and sometimes declined) Greek variants, but also notes that the full form Joseph is dominant with 47 of 69 Greek inscriptions.

== New Testament ==
Joses and Joseph in their various grammatical cases are often found as textual variants in the New Testament.

=== Joses, brother of Jesus ===
"Is not this the carpenter, the son of Mary and brother of James and Joses and Judas and Simon? And are not his sisters here with us? And they took offense at him." (Mark 6:3, ESV)

"Is not this the carpenter's son? Is not his mother called Mary? And are not his brothers James and Joseph and Simon and Judas?" (Matthew 13:55, ESV)

A minority of (Alexandrian, Western) Greek manuscripts in Matthew 13:55 read "Joseph" (Ἰωσήφ) the standard spelling of the name. Roman Catholics hold that Joses the brother of Jesus is the same as Joses the brother of James referred in Matthew 27:56 and Mark 15:40.

=== Joses, brother of James (the Just) ===
In Mark 15:40 and Mark 15:47, a Joses is identified as the son of a certain Mary, who is also the mother of a certain James. For both verses, Ἰωσῆτος and Ἰωσῆ are found as textual variants, but both are genitives of Ἰωσὴς meaning of Joses.

"There were also women looking on from a distance, among whom were Mary Magdalene, and Mary the mother of James the younger and of Joses, and Salome." (Mark 15:40, ESV)
"Mary Magdalene and Mary the mother of Joses saw where [Jesus] was laid." (15:47 ESV).

Matthew 27:56 also refers to a Mary, mother of a James, but it is unclear whether her other son is called Joses (Ἰωσῆ, favoured by Stephanus Textus Receptus 1550, Scrivener's Textus Receptus 1894, RP Byzantine Majority Text 2005, and the Greek Orthodox Church) or Joseph (Ἰωσὴφ, favoured by Westcott and Hort 1881, Westcott and Hort / [NA27 and UBS4 variants], Tischendorf's 8th Edition 1864–94, and Nestle 1904). Modern English Bible translations are about evenly split on which textual variant to follow, with half including the New International Version (1978) rendering it as of Joseph, and the other half including the English Standard Version (2001) as of Joses.

"There were also many women there, looking on from a distance, who had followed Jesus from Galilee, ministering to him, among whom were Mary Magdalene and Mary the mother of James and Joseph and the mother of the sons of Zebedee." (Matthew 27:55–56, ESV)

In the New Testament, the name "James the Less" appears only in Mark 15:40, who, by parallel accounts of the women at the crucifixion is usually equated with the James in "Mary the mother of James," who in turn is sometimes equated with Mary of Clopas, mentioned only in John 19:25. According to a tradition of Hegesippus (Eusebius III.11), this Clopas was a brother of Joseph, making his wife Mary Jesus' aunt and this James the younger and Joses to be Jesus' cousins.

James Tabor speculates that Mary the mother of James is the same person with Mary the mother of Jesus and that Clopas was her second husband, thus making Joses half brother of Jesus. Roman Catholic tradition follows Jerome's view that Mary the mother of James (wife of Clopas) is the sister of Mary the mother of Jesus, though they need not be literally sisters, in light of the usage of the said words in Greek, Hebrew and Aramaic.

=== Acts 4:36 (Barnabas) ===
Acts 4:36 states that the person whom the apostles surnamed/nicknamed/called Barnabas (Βαρνάβας) was actually named Ἰωσὴφ (Joseph) according to Westcott and Hort 1881, Westcott and Hort / [NA27 and UBS4 variants], Tischendorf's 8th Edition 1864–94, and Nestle 1904, or Ἰωσὴς (Joses) according to Stephanus Textus Receptus 1550, Scrivener's Textus Receptus 1894, RP Byzantine Majority Text 2005, and the Greek Orthodox Church. Most modern English Bible translations such as the New International Version (1978) render it as Joseph, a minority including the King James Version (1611) as Joses.

=== Luke 3:29 ===
In the Lukan genealogy of Jesus, Luke 3:29 mentions a Ἰησοῦ or a Ἰωσή (both in genetive) as the 15th descendant of David in the line from Solomon's younger brother Nathan. Ἰησοῦ Iēsou is the textual variant favoured by Westcott and Hort 1881, Westcott and Hort / [NA27 and UBS4 variants], Tischendorf's 8th Edition 1864–94, and Nestle 1904, while the variant Ἰωσῆ Iōsē is favoured by Stephanus Textus Receptus 1550, Scrivener's Textus Receptus 1894, RP Byzantine Majority Text 2005, and the Greek Orthodox Church. Most modern English Bible translations such as the New International Version (1978) render it as Joshua, many others including the King James Version (1611) as Jose, and a few including the American Standard Version (1900) as Jesus.

== Bishops of Jerusalem ==
A "Joses" appears in the bishop lists of Epiphanius ("Josis") and Eusebius ("Joseph") of the early bishops of Jerusalem.

== Christian traditions ==
In the medieval Golden Legend, Joses is also identified with Joseph Barsabbas, also called Justus, who in the Acts of the Apostles 1:23 is mentioned as a candidate to fill the vacancy created by the death of Judas Iscariot.

Eusebius lists Justus as the third Bishop of Jerusalem after James the Just and Simeon of Jerusalem. He does not, however, specify whether this Justus is to be identified with Joses, the brother of Jesus:

But when Symeon also had died in the manner described, a certain Jew by the name of Justus succeeded to the episcopal throne in Jerusalem. He was one of the many thousands of the circumcision who at that time believed in Christ.

Conversely, in the second book of Panarion, Epiphanius identifies the third Bishop of Jerusalem as "Judah", and the Apostolic Constitutions similarly calls him "Judas the son of James".

== See also ==
- James, brother of Jesus
- James the Less
- Jesus Justus
- Jude, brother of Jesus
- New Testament people named Joseph
- Simon, brother of Jesus
