= Mary of Clopas =

Woman present at the crucifixion of Jesus

Saint Mary of Clopas
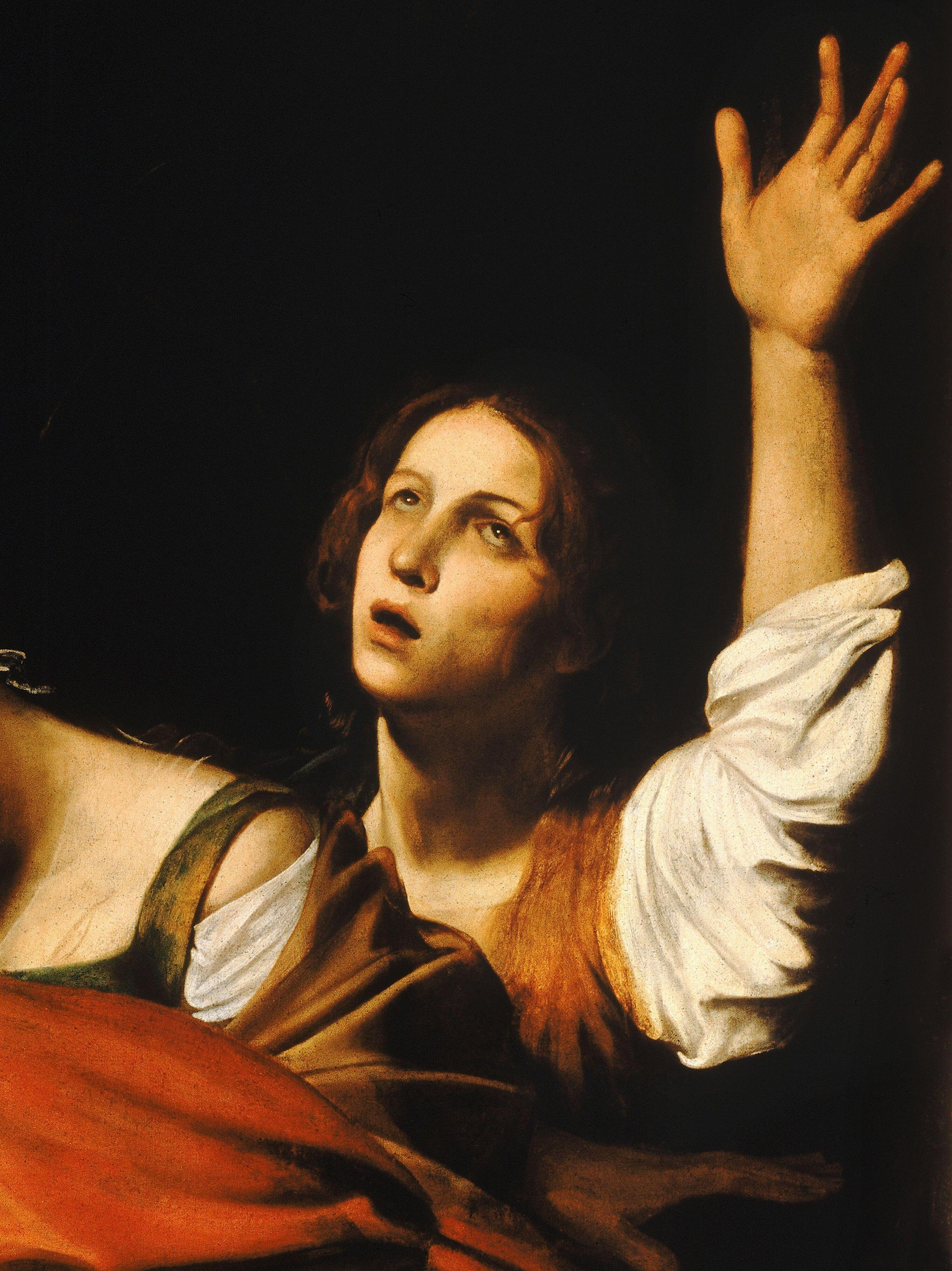
- Detail from The Entombment of Christ by Caravaggio, 1603–1604

Myrrhbearer
- Venerated in: Eastern Orthodox Church; Catholic Church; Oriental Orthodox Church
- Feast: May 23 (Orthodoxy); April 24 (Catholicism)

According to the Gospel of John, Mary of Clopas (Ancient Greek: Μαρία ἡ τοῦ Κλωπᾶ, romanized: María hē toû Clōpâ) was one of the women present at the crucifixion of Jesus and bringing supplies for his funeral. The expression Mary of Clopas in the Greek text is ambiguous as to whether Mary was the daughter or wife of Clopas, but exegesis has commonly favoured the reading "wife of Clopas". Hegesippus identified Clopas as a brother of Joseph. In the latest official edition of the Roman Martyrology of the Catholic Church she is commemorated with Salome on April 24.

Along with Mary Magdalene and "Mary" Salome, Mary of Clopas is known as one of the Three Marys at the tomb of Jesus. Her relics are said to be in France at the Church of the Saintes Maries de la Mer.

== Appearances in the gospels ==
Mary of Clopas is explicitly mentioned only in John 19:25, where she is among the women present at the crucifixion of Jesus:

Now there stood by the cross of Jesus His mother and His mother’s sister, Mary of Clopas, and Mary Magdalene.

The Gospels of Mark and Matthew each include similar passages that are nearly identical to one another:

Among which was Mary Magdalene, and Mary the mother of James and Joseph, and the mother of Zebedee's children.

There were also women looking on afar off: among whom was Mary Magdalene, and Mary the mother of James the less and of Joses, and Salome.

This has led scholars to identify Mary of Clopas with "Mary the mother of James and Joseph/Joses". The Gospels of Matthew and Mark mention James and Joseph/Joses (with Mark always using the less common variation "Joses") among the four brothers of Jesus.

According to some interpretations, the same Mary was also among the women that on resurrection morning went to the tomb to anoint the body of Jesus with spices. Matthew calls her "the other Mary" to distinguish her from Mary Magdalene, while Mark uses the name "Mary, the mother of James" (Maria Iacobi in Latin).

== Apocryphal writings ==
In a manner very similar to the Gospel of John, the apocryphal Gospel of Philip (3rd century) also seems to list Mary of Clopas among Jesus' female entourage:

There were three who always walked with the Lord: Mary, his mother, and her sister, and Magdalene, the one who was called his companion. His sister and his mother and his companion were each a Mary.

Adding to the confusion, the Gospel of Philip seems to refer to her as Jesus' mother's sister ("her sister") and Jesus' own sister ("his sister").

The Gospel of Pseudo-Matthew (7th century) presents Mary of Cleophas as the daughter of Cleophas and Anna:

Jesus met them, with Mary His mother, along with her sister Mary of Cleophas, whom the Lord God had given to her father Cleophas and her mother Anna, because they had offered Mary the mother of Jesus to the Lord. And she was called by the same name, Mary, for the consolation of her parents.

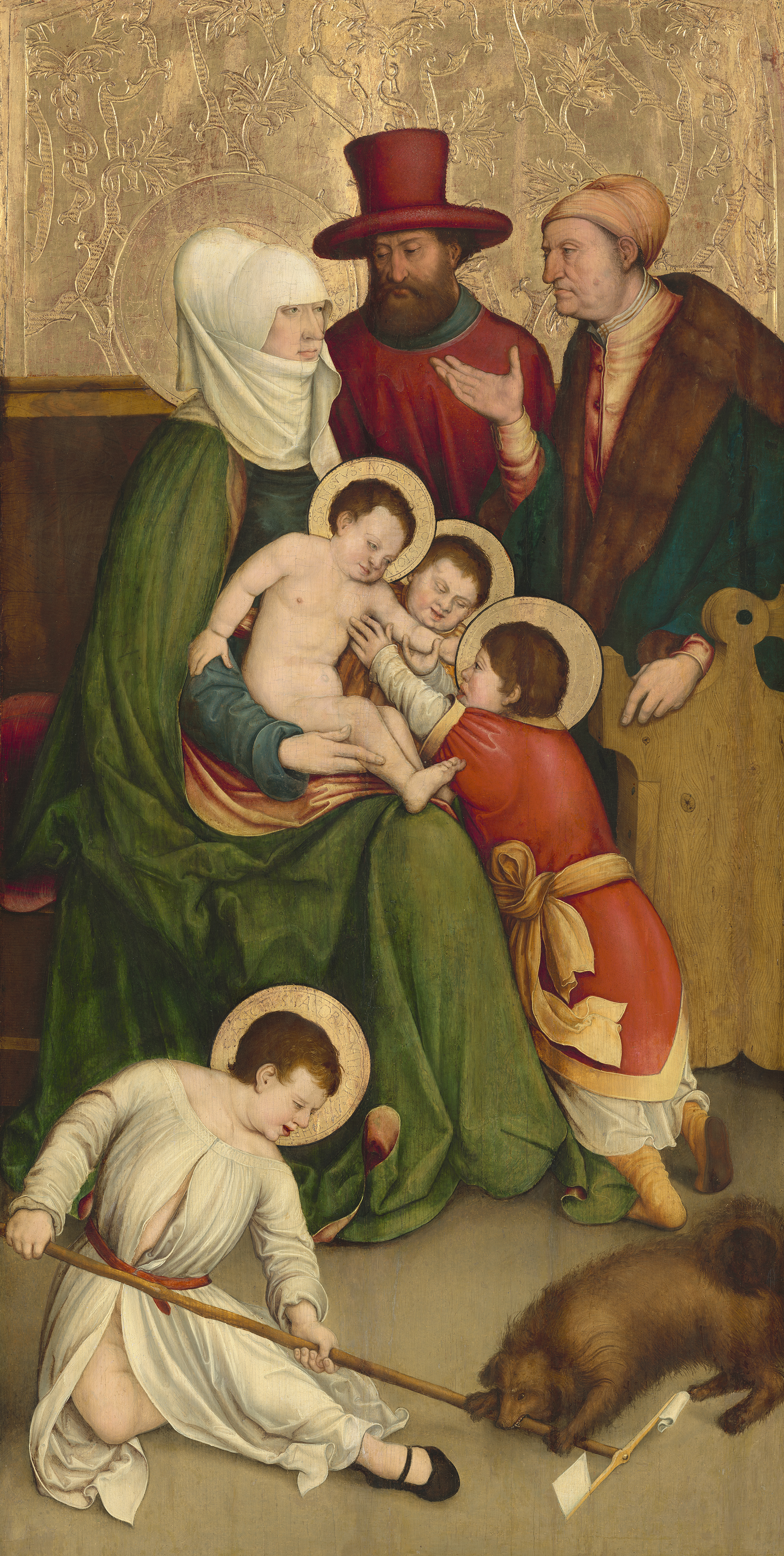
Saint Mary Cleophas and Her Family by Bernhard Strigel

== Identity of Clopas ==
The expression Mary of Clopas in the Greek text is ambiguous as to whether Mary was the daughter or wife of Clopas, but exegesis has commonly favoured the reading "wife of Clopas". Clopas appears in early Christian writings as a brother of Joseph, and as the father of Simeon, the second bishop of Jerusalem. Eusebius of Caesarea, referencing the works of Hegesippus, relates in his Church History (Book III, ch. 11), that after the destruction of Jerusalem in 70 AD, the Christians of Jerusalem:

all with one consent pronounced Symeon, the son of Clopas, of whom the Gospel also makes mention; to be worthy of the episcopal throne of that parish. He was a cousin, as they say, of the Saviour. For Hegesippus records that Clopas was a brother of Joseph.

This identification would make Joseph a brother-in-law of Mary of Clopas.

Clopas was sometimes further identified with Cleopas and Alphaeus, father of James, one of the Twelve Apostles. In 1982, Stephen S. Smalley, Dean Emeritus of Chester Cathedral, deemed this identification "probable" In medieval tradition, Clopas was identified as the second husband of Anne and as the father of Mary of Clopas, allowing Mary to be identified as the half-sister of Mary, the mother of Jesus.

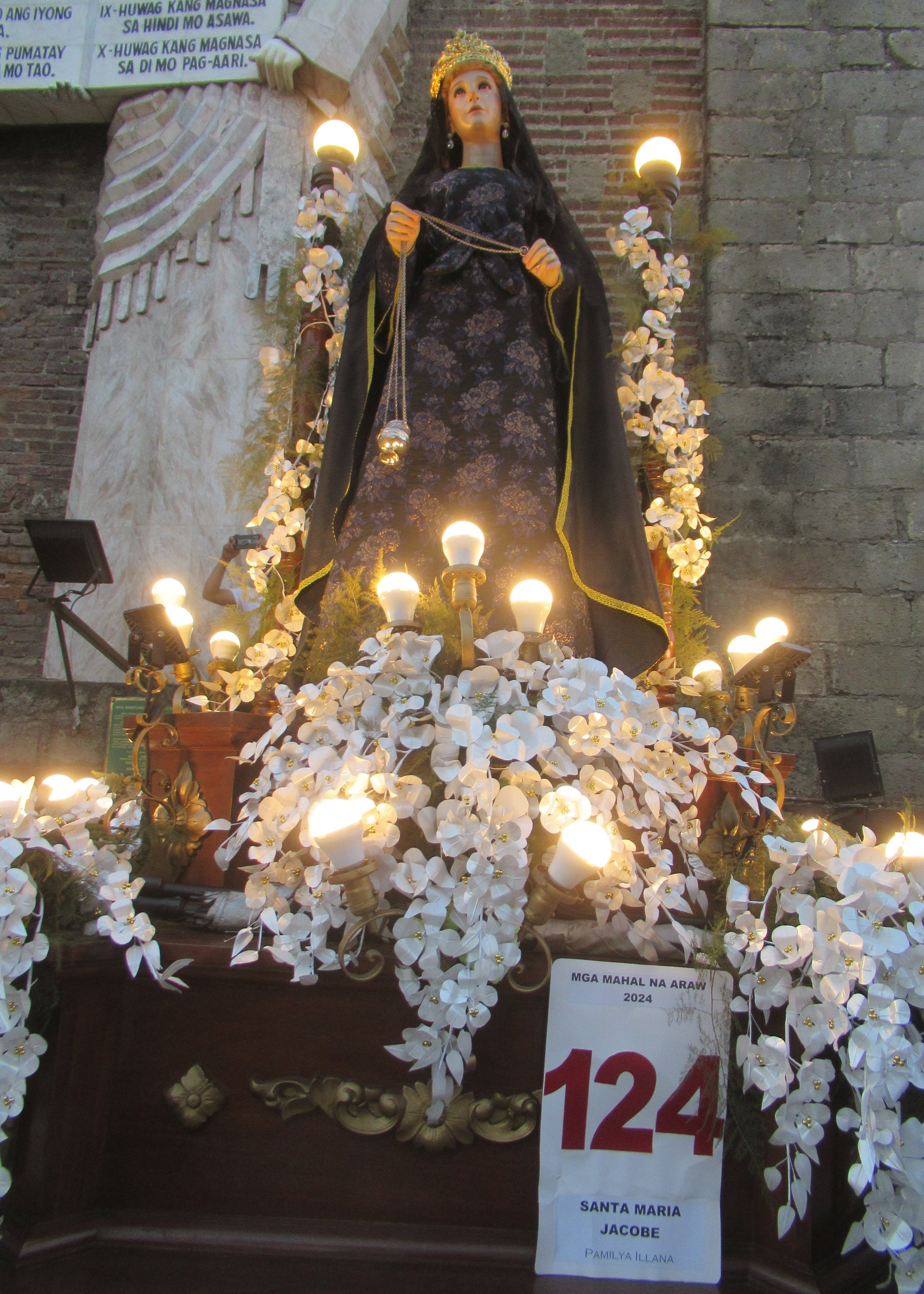
Santa Maria Jacobe (2024 Good Friday processions, Philippines)

== Mary of Clopas and the brothers of Jesus ==
Jerome (347–420), writing Against Helvidius in defense of perpetual virginity of the mother of Jesus, argued that the brothers of Jesus (James, Simon, Jude (also identified in tradition with Judas Thaddeus), and Joses or Joseph) were children of Mary of Clopas, the sister of the mother of Jesus, making them first cousins of Jesus and not direct siblings. Jerome also identified James, the brother of Jesus, with the Apostle James, son of Alphaeus (James the Less) and thus supposed that Mary of Clopas was married to Alphaeus (Clopas).

This view finds support in a fragment found in a medieval manuscript, which lists four Maries mentioned in the gospels and bears the inscription "Papia" on the margin. According to Papias, "Mary the wife of Cleophas or Alphaeus, was the mother of James, Simon and Thaddeus, and of one Joseph." The attribution of this fragment to Papias of Hierapolis (c. AD 70–163) however has been disputed in favour of a medieval author (possibly Papias the lexicographer, fl. 1040s–1060s) by Anglican bishops and theologians J.B. Lightfoot (1828–1889). and Brooke Foss Westcott (1825–1901). For example, Lightfoot argued that it seems quite impossible for Jerome not to quote Papias who would have fully supported his view, despite having access to his writings, and the quote seems to be derived from Jerome's writings, some parts being almost word for word with what Jerome said in adv. Helvid.

James Tabor deduced that "Mary the mother of James and Joses" is none other than Mary, the mother of Jesus herself. This interpretation would necessitate that Mary the mother of Jesus married a man named Clopas, after her marriage to Joseph (perhaps after his death). Tabor proposes that a brother of Joseph would have been obliged to wed his widowed wife in a Levirate marriage, despite this only being permissible if the first marriage had been childless.
