= James, brother of Jesus =

First leader of the Church of Jerusalem

Saint James the Just
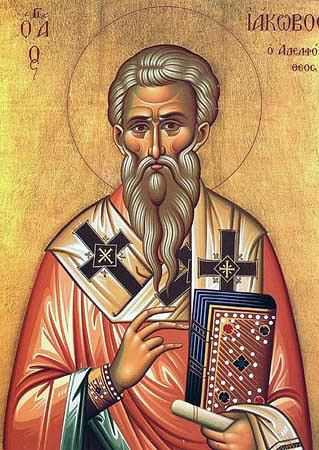
- Icon of James

Apostle Martyr Adelphotheos Bishop of Jerusalem Disciple of the Seventy
- Died: 62 AD or 69 AD; Jerusalem
- Venerated in: All Christian denominations that venerate saints
- Canonized: Pre-Congregation
- Feast: May 3 (Catholic), October 23 (Lutheran), (Episcopal Church (USA)), (Eastern Orthodox), December 26 (Eastern Orthodox)
- Attributes: Red martyr, fuller's club; man holding a book
- Controversy: There is disagreement about the exact relationship to Jesus. (Note: In Koine Greek, ἀδελφός (adelphos, 'brother') as found in both the Septuagint and NT writings, can mean a full, half, step brother or adopted brother, a kinsman (cousin, etc.), as well as a fellow—a kinsman in trade or belief but not of any blood relationship. High Church Christians (Catholics, Orthodox, and some Anglican and Lutheran Protestant denominations) and some Reformed churches who maintain early Church teachings generally hold him as either a step-brother or a cousin, whereas most Low Church Protestant denominations maintain James is a younger brother from Mary and Joseph as a proof against Mary's ever-virgin status.)

James the Just, or a variation of James, brother of the Lord (Latin: Iacobus from Hebrew: יעקב, Yaʿăqōḇ and Ancient Greek: Ἰάκωβος, Iákōbos, can also be Anglicized as "Jacob"), was, according to the New Testament, a brother of Jesus. James was personally known to Paul the Apostle (Gal 1:19). He was the first leader of the Church of Jerusalem. (Note: He is often described as the first bishop of Jerusalem, but that term had not yet been clearly defined in his day. The terms "epískopos" ("bishop") and "presbýteros" ("presbyter") were not clearly distinguished until the second century, in writings attributed to Ignatius of Antioch.) James was martyred, though the year and manner were disputed; Josephus records his death in 62 AD by being stoned to death on the order of High Priest Ananus ben Ananus, while Hegesippus places his death in 69 AD by being thrown off the pinnacle of the Temple by scribes and Pharisees and then clubbed to death. James, Joses, Simon, and Judas are mentioned as the brothers of Jesus as well as two or more unnamed sisters. (See Matthew 13:55; Mark 6:3.)

Catholics, Orthodox and some Protestants teach that James and others named in the New Testament as brothers (Note: Ancient Greek: ἀδελφοί, romanized: adelphoi, lit. 'brothers'.) of Jesus were not the biological children of Mary, mother of Jesus, but cousins or step-brothers from a previous marriage of Joseph (as related in the non-canonical Gospel of James). (Note: Since Catholics and Eastern Orthodox, as well as some Anglicans and Lutherans, believe in the perpetual virginity of Mary.) Others consider James to be the son of Mary and Joseph.

The Catholic tradition holds that this James is to be identified with James, son of Alphaeus, and James the Less. It is agreed by most that he should not be confused with James, son of Zebedee, also known as James the Great.

== Epithet ==
Eusebius records that Clement of Alexandria related, "This James, whom the people of old called the Just because of his outstanding virtue, was the first, as the record tells us, to be elected to the episcopal throne of the Jerusalem church." Other epithets are "James the brother of the Lord, surnamed the Just", and "James the Righteous".

He is sometimes referred to in Eastern Christianity as "James Adelphotheos" (Ancient Greek: Ἰάκωβος ὁ Ἀδελφόθεος), meaning "James the Brother of God". The oldest surviving Christian liturgy, the Liturgy of St James, uses this epithet.

== Leader of the Jerusalem Church ==
=== Jerusalem Church ===
The Jerusalem Church was an early Christian community located in Jerusalem, of which James and Peter were leaders. The predominant place and residence of James in the city are implied by Galatians 1:19. Clement of Alexandria, as recorded by Eusebius, says: "Peter and James and John, after the Saviour's ascension, though pre-eminently honored by the Lord, did not contend for glory, but made James the Just bishop of Jerusalem."

According to Eusebius, the Jerusalem church escaped to Pella during the siege of Jerusalem by the future Emperor Titus in 70 AD and afterwards returned, having a further series of Jewish bishops until the Bar Kokhba revolt in 130 AD. Following the second destruction of Jerusalem and the rebuilding of the city as Aelia Capitolina, subsequent bishops were Greeks.

=== Leader ===
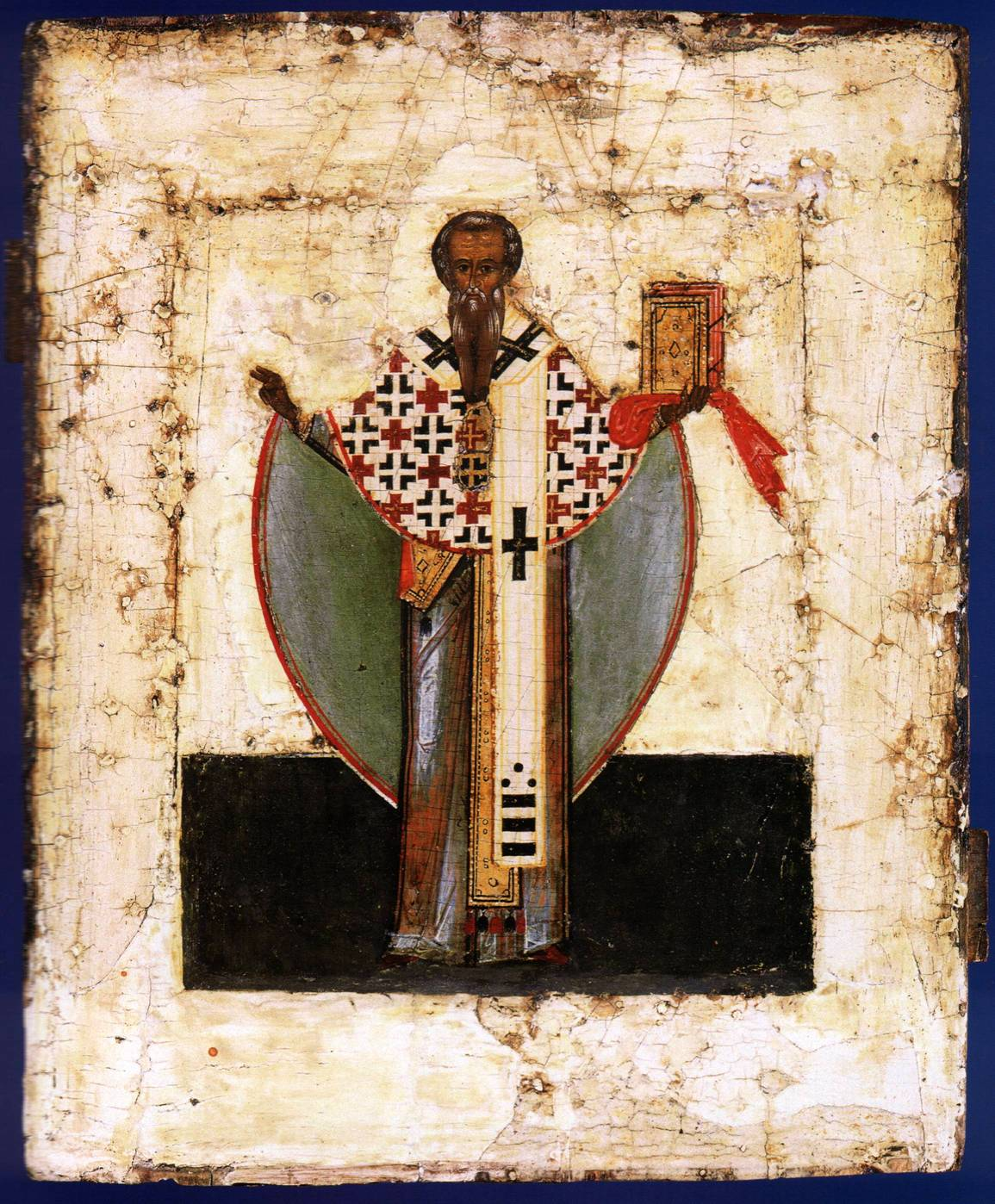
James the Just, 16th-century Russian icon

James the Just was "from an early date, with Peter, a leader of the Church at Jerusalem and from the time when Peter left Jerusalem after Herod Agrippa's attempt to kill him, James appears as the principal authority who presided at the Council of Jerusalem."

The Pauline epistles and the later chapters of the Acts of the Apostles portray James as an important figure in the Jewish Christian community of Jerusalem. When Paul arrives in Jerusalem to deliver the money he raised for the faithful there, it is to James that he speaks, and it is James who insists that Paul ritually cleanse himself at Herod's Temple to prove his faith and deny rumors of teaching rebellion against the Torah (Acts 21:18). This was a charge of antinomianism. In Paul's account of his visit to Jerusalem in Galatians 1:18–19, he states that he stayed with Cephas (better known as Peter) and James, the brother of the Lord, was the only other apostle he met.

Paul describes James as being one of the persons to whom the risen Christ showed himself, (1 Corinthians 15:3–8). In Galatians 2:9, Paul mentions James with Cephas (Peter) and John the Apostle as the three Pillars of the Church. Paul describes these pillars as the ones who will minister to the "circumcised" (in general Jews and Jewish proselytes) in Jerusalem, while Paul and his fellows will minister to the "uncircumcised" (in general gentiles) (Galatians 2:12), (Note: These terms (circumcised/uncircumcised) are generally interpreted to mean Jews and Greeks, who were predominant. This is an oversimplification, as 1st-century Judaea Province also had some Jews who no longer circumcised and some Greeks and others such as Egyptians, Ethiopians, and Arabs who did.) after a debate in response to concerns of the Christians of Antioch. The Antioch community was concerned over whether Gentile Christians need be circumcised to be saved, and sent Paul and Barnabas to confer with the Jerusalem church. James played a prominent role in the formulation of the council's decision. James was the last named figure to speak, after Peter, Paul, and Barnabas; he delivered what he called his "decision" (Acts 15:13–21). The original sense is closer to "opinion". James supported them all in being against the requirement (Peter had cited his earlier revelation from God regarding Gentiles) and suggested prohibitions about eating blood as well as meat sacrificed to idols and fornication. This became the ruling of the council, agreed upon by all the apostles and elders and sent to the other churches by letter.

=== Modern interpretation ===
The Encyclopædia Britannica relates that "James the Lord's brother was a Christian apostle, according to St. Paul, although not one of the original Twelve Apostles." According to Protestant theologian Philip Schaff, James seems to have taken the place of James the son of Zebedee, after his martyrdom, around 44 AD.

Modern historians of the early Christian churches tend to place James in the tradition of Jewish Christianity; whereas Paul emphasized faith over observance of Mosaic Law, James is thought to have espoused the opposite position. (Note: One corpus commonly cited as proof of this are the Recognitions and Homilies of Clement (also known as the Clementine literature), versions of a novel that has been dated to as early as the 2nd century, where James appears as a saintly figure who is assaulted by an unnamed enemy some modern critics think may be Paul.)

According to Schaff, James was the local head of the oldest church and the leader of the most conservative portion of Jewish Christianity. Theologian James Dunn proposed that Peter was the "bridge-man" between the two other "prominent leading figures", Paul and James the Just.

== Sources ==
Apart from a handful of references in the synoptic Gospels, the main sources for the life of James the Just are the Pauline epistles, the Acts of the Apostles, the Roman–Jewish historian Josephus, and the early Christian historians Eusebius and Jerome, the last two of whom also quote the early Christian chronicler Hegesippus, and Epiphanius. There is no mention of James in the Gospel of John or the early portions of the Acts of the Apostles. The Synoptics mention his name, but provide no further information.

In the extant lists of Pseudo-Hippolytus of Rome, Dorotheus of Tyre, the Chronicon Paschale, and Dimitry of Rostov, he is the first of the Seventy Apostles though some sources, such as the Catholic Encyclopedia, state that "these lists are unfortunately worthless".

=== Josephus ===
Josephus, in his work Antiquities of the Jews (Book 20, Chapter 9, 1), refers to the stoning of "James the brother of Jesus" by order of Ananus ben Ananus, a Herodian-era High Priest.

Ananus, who, as we have told you already, took the high priesthood, was a bold man in his temper, and very insolent; he was also of the sect of the Sadducees, who are very rigid in judging offenders, above all the rest of the Jews, as we have already observed; when, therefore, Ananus was of this disposition, he thought he had now a proper opportunity [to exercise his authority]. Festus was now dead, and Albinus was but upon the road; so he assembled the Sanhedrin of judges, and brought before them the brother of Jesus, who was called Christ, whose name was James, and some others, [or, some of his companions]; and when he had formed an accusation against them as breakers of the law, he delivered them to be stoned.

The James referred to in this passage is most likely the James to whom the Epistle of James has been attributed. The translations of Josephus' writing into other languages have at times included passages that are not found in the Greek texts, raising the possibility of interpolation, but this passage on James is found in all manuscripts, including the Greek texts.

The context of the passage is the period following the death of Porcius Festus, and the journey to Alexandria by Lucceius Albinus, the new Roman procurator of Judea, who held that position from 62 AD to 64 AD. Because Albinus' journey to Alexandria had to have concluded no later than the summer of 62 AD, the date of James' death can be assigned with some certainty to around that year. The 2nd-century chronicler Hegesippus also left an account of the death of James, and while the details he provides diverge from those of Josephus, the two accounts share similar elements.

Modern scholarship has almost universally acknowledged the authenticity of the reference to "the brother of Jesus, who was called Christ, whose name was James" (τὸν ἀδελφὸν Ἰησοῦ τοῦ λεγομένου Χριστοῦ, Ἰάκωβος ὄνομα αὐτῷ) and has rejected it being the result of later Christian interpolation. Moreover, in comparison with Hegesippus' account of James' death, most scholars consider Josephus' to be the more historically reliable. Some scholars have noted Josephus is more sympathetic to James than to his brother.

=== New Testament ===
The New Testament mentions several people named James. The Pauline epistles, from about the sixth decade of the 1st century, have two passages mentioning a James. The Acts of the Apostles, written sometime between 60 and 150 AD, also describes the period before the destruction of Jerusalem in 70 AD. It has three mentions of a James. The Gospels, with disputed datings ranging from about 50 to as late as 130 AD, describe the period of Jesus's ministry, around 30–33 AD. It mentions at least two different people named James. The author of the Epistle of Jude notes that he is a brother of James in that epistle's opening paragraph.

==== Epistle of James ====
The Epistle of James has been traditionally attributed to James the Just since 253, but, according to Dan McCartney, it is now common for scholars to disagree on its authorship.

==== Pauline epistles ====
Paul mentions meeting James "the Lord's brother" (τὸν ἀδελφὸν τοῦ κυρίου) and later calls him one of the pillars (στύλοι) in the Epistle to the Galatians Galatians 1:18–2:10:

Then after three years I went up to Jerusalem to visit Cephas and remained with him fifteen days. But I saw none of the other apostles except James the Lord's brother. (In what I am writing to you, before God, I do not lie!) Then I went into the regions of Syria and Cilicia. ...Then after fourteen years I went up again to Jerusalem with Barnabas, taking Titus along with me. ...Yet because of false brothers secretly brought in—who slipped in to spy out our freedom that we have in Christ Jesus, so that they might bring us into slavery—to them we did not yield in submission even for a moment, so that the truth of the gospel might be preserved for you. And from those who seemed to be influential (what they were makes no difference to me; God shows no partiality)—those, I say, who seemed influential added nothing to me. On the contrary, when they saw that I had been entrusted with the gospel to the uncircumcised, just as Peter had been entrusted with the gospel to the circumcised (for he who worked through Peter for his apostolic ministry to the circumcised worked also through me for mine to the Gentiles), and when James and Cephas and John, who seemed to be pillars, perceived the grace that was given to me, they gave the right hand of fellowship to Barnabas and me, that we should go to the Gentiles and they to the circumcised. Only, they asked us to remember the poor, the very thing I was eager to do.

A "James" is mentioned in Paul's First Epistle to the Corinthians, 1 Corinthians 15:7, as one to whom Jesus appeared after his resurrection:

For I delivered unto you first of all that which also I received: that Christ died for our sins according to the scriptures; and that he was buried; and that he hath been raised on the third day according to the scriptures; and that he appeared to Cephas; then to the twelve; then he appeared to above five hundred brethren at once, of whom the greater part remain until now, but some are fallen asleep; then he appeared to James; then to all the apostles; and last of all, as to the [child] untimely born, he appeared to me also.

In the preceding verse, the same Greek word "adelphos" (brother) is used, but not in a blood-relation sense:

Then he appeared to more than five hundred brothers at one time, most of whom are still alive, though some have fallen asleep. (1 Corinthians 15:6)

==== Acts of the Apostles ====
There is a James mentioned in Acts, which the Catholic Encyclopedia identifies with James, the brother of Jesus: "but he [Peter], beckoning unto them with the hand to hold their peace, declared unto them how the Lord had brought him out of the prison. And he said, Go show these things unto James, and to the brethren. And he departed, and went into another place. (Acts 12:17)

When Peter, having miraculously escaped from prison, must flee Jerusalem due to Herod Agrippa's persecution, he asks for James to be informed (Acts 12:17).

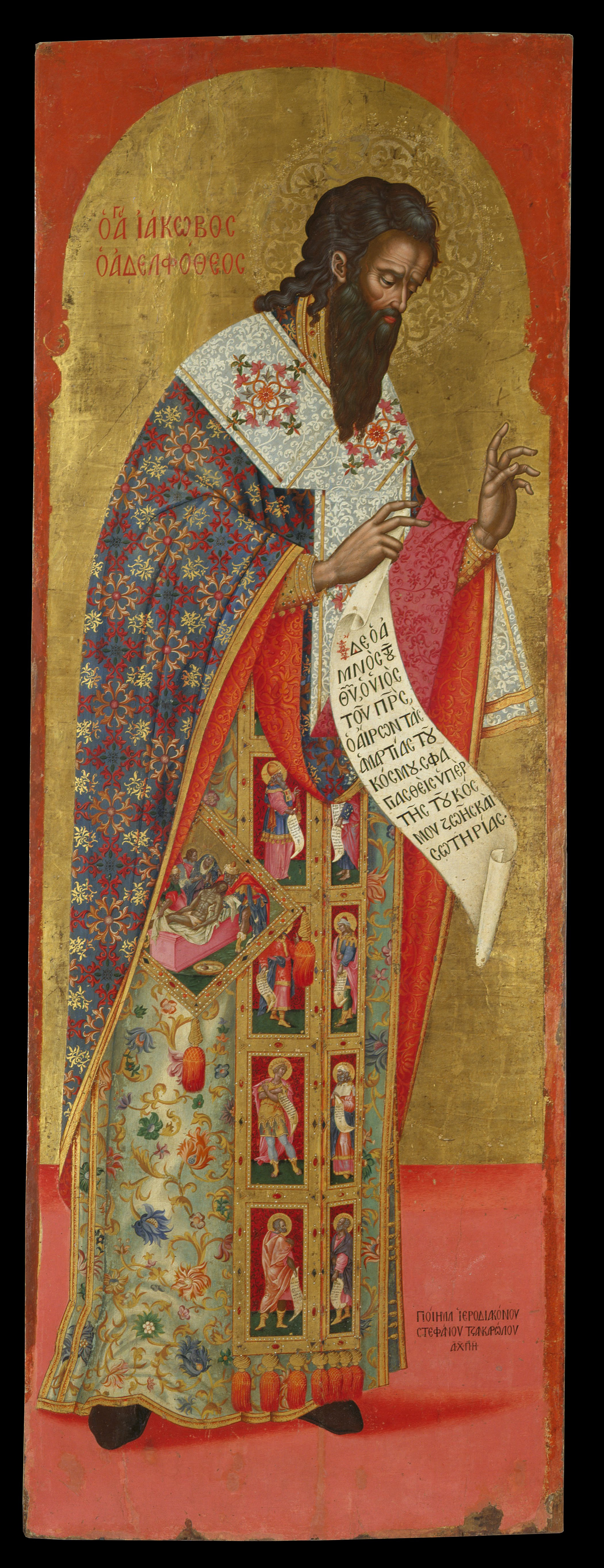
Icon by Stephanos Tzangarolas, 1688

James is also an authority in the early church at the Council of Jerusalem (James is quoting Amos 9:11–12):

And after they had held their peace, James answered, saying, Men and brethren, hearken unto me: Simeon hath declared how God at the first did visit the Gentiles, to take out of them a people for his name. And to this agree the words of the prophets; as it is written, After this I will return, and will build again the tabernacle of David, which is fallen down; and I will build again the ruins thereof, and I will set it up: That the residue of men might seek after the Lord, and all the Gentiles, upon whom my name is called, saith the Lord, who doeth all these things. Known unto God are all his works from the beginning of the world. Wherefore my sentence is, that we trouble not them, which from among the Gentiles are turned to God: But that we write unto them, that they abstain from pollutions of idols, and from fornication, and from things strangled, and from blood. For Moses of old time hath in every city them that preach him, being read in the synagogues every sabbath day. (Acts 15:13–21)

James is presented as a principal author of the Apostolic Decree of Acts 15.

After this, there is only one more mention of James in Acts, meeting with Paul shortly before Paul's arrest: "And when we were come to Jerusalem, the brethren received us gladly. And the day following Paul went in with us unto James; and all the elders were present." (Acts 21:17–18)

==== Gospels ====
The Synoptic Gospels, similarly to the Epistle to the Galatians, recognize a core group of three disciples (Peter, John and James) having the same names as those given by Paul. In the list of the disciples found in the Gospels, two disciples whose names are James, the son of Alphaeus and James, son of Zebedee are mentioned in the list of the twelve disciples: (Matthew 10:1–4)

And he called to him his twelve disciples and gave them authority over unclean spirits, to cast them out, and to heal every disease and every affliction. The names of the twelve apostles are these: first, Simon, who is called Peter, and Andrew his brother; James the son of Zebedee, and John his brother; Philip and Bartholomew; Thomas, and Matthew the tax collector; James the son of Alphaeus, and Thaddaeus; Simon the Cananaean, and Judas Iscariot, who betrayed him.

The Gospel of Mark and the Gospel of Matthew also mention a James as Jesus's brother: "Is not this the carpenter, the son of Mary, the brother of James, and Joses, and of Judah, and Simon? and are not his sisters here with us? And they were offended at him." The Gospel of John does not mention anyone called James, but mentions Jesus's unnamed brothers accompanying Jesus and his mother after the wedding at Cana to Capernaum (John 2:12), and later that his brothers did not believe in him (John 7:5).

=== Church Fathers ===
Fragment X of Papias (writing in the second century) refers to "James the bishop and apostle".

Hegesippus (c. 110 – c. 180), in the fifth book of his Commentaries on the Acts of the Church, (lost but quoted by Eusebius) mentions that James was made a bishop of Jerusalem but does not mention by whom: "After the apostles, James the brother of the Lord surnamed the Just was made head of the church at Jerusalem." In describing James's ascetic lifestyle, Eusebius's Ecclesiastical History (Book II, 23) quotes Hegesippus' account of James from the fifth book of his Commentaries:

James, the Lord's brother, succeeds to the government of the Church, in conjunction with the apostles. He has been universally called the Just, from the days of the Lord down to the present time. For many bore the name of James; but this one was holy from his mother's womb. He drank no wine or other intoxicating liquor, nor did he eat flesh; no razor came upon his head; he did not anoint himself with oil, nor make use of the bath. He alone was permitted to enter the holy place: for he did not wear any woollen garment, but fine linen only. He alone, I say, was wont to go into the temple: and he used to be found kneeling on his knees, begging forgiveness for the people-so that the skin of his knees became horny like that of a camel's, by reason of his constantly bending the knee in adoration to God, and begging forgiveness for the people.

Clement of Alexandria (late 2nd century) wrote in the sixth book of his Hypotyposes that James the Just was chosen as a bishop of Jerusalem by Peter, James (the Greater) and John:

For they say that Peter and James and John after the ascension of our Saviour, as if also preferred by our Lord, strove not after honor, but chose James the Just bishop of Jerusalem. (Note: See the Early Church Fathers and Jerome.)

Clement, in the seventh book of the same work, relates also the following concerning him:

The Lord after his resurrection imparted knowledge (gnōsin) to James the Just and to John and Peter, and they imparted it to the rest of the apostles, and the rest of the apostles to the seventy, of whom Barnabas was one.

According to Eusebius (3rd/4th century) James was named a bishop of Jerusalem by the apostles: "James, the brother of the Lord, to whom the episcopal seat at Jerusalem had been entrusted by the apostles". Jerome wrote the same: "James... after our Lord's passion... ordained by the apostles bishop of Jerusalem..." and that James "ruled the church of Jerusalem thirty years".

Epiphanius (4th century), bishop of Salamis, wrote in his work The Panarion (374–375 AD) that "James, the brother of the Lord died in virginity at the age of ninety-six".

According to Jerome (4th/5th century), James, the Lord's brother, was an apostle, too; Jerome quotes Scriptures as a proof in his work "The Perpetual Virginity of Blessed Mary", writing the following:

Notice, moreover, that the Lord's brother is an apostle, since Paul says «Then after three years I went up to Jerusalem to visit Cephas, and tarried with him fifteen days. But other of the Apostles saw I none, save James the Lord's brother.» (Galatians 1:18-19) And in the same Epistle «And when they perceived the grace that was given unto me, James and Cephas and John, who were reputed to be pillars,» (Galatians 2:9)

Pseudo-Andrew of Crete (7th century) wrote a biography of James, based entirely on earlier sources, mainly Eusebius.

=== Early Christian apocrypha ===
Some apocryphal gospels testify to the reverence Jewish followers of Jesus had for James. The Gospel of the Hebrews confirms the account of Paul in 1 Corinthians regarding the risen Jesus's appearance to James. Jerome quotes the non-canonical Gospel of the Hebrews:

'Now the Lord, after he had given his grave clothes to the servant of the priest, appeared to James, for James had sworn that he would not eat bread from that hour in which he had drunk the Lord's cup until he should see him risen from the dead.' And a little further on the Lord says, 'bring a table and bread.' And immediately it is added, 'He took bread and blessed and broke and gave it to James the Just and said to him, "My brother, eat your bread, for the Son of Man is risen from the dead."' And so he ruled the church of Jerusalem thirty years, that is, until the seventh year of Nero. (Note: See Jerome and the Early Church Fathers.)

The Gospel of Thomas (Note: One of the works included in the Nag Hammadi library.) confirms the account of Paul in 1 Corinthians regarding the risen Jesus's appearance to James. The Gospel of Thomas relates that the disciples asked Jesus, after his resurrection and before his Ascension, "We are aware that you will depart from us. Who will be our leader?" Jesus said to them, "No matter where you come [from] it is to James the Just that you shall go, for whose sake heaven and earth have come to exist." Epiphanius (Panarion 29.4) describes James as a Nazirite.

The pseudepigraphical First Apocalypse of James associated with James's name mentions that James and Jesus are not biological brothers, with a rather fragmentary account of the departure (possibly meaning martyrdom) of James appended to the bottom of the manuscript.

The pseudepigraphical Second Apocalypse of James names James's father Theudas rather than Joseph, who is presented as the biological father of James.

The Apocryphon of James, the sole copy of which was found in the Nag Hammadi library and which may have been written in Egypt in the 3rd century, recounts a post-resurrection appearance of the risen Christ to James and Peter that James is said to have recorded in Hebrew.

The Gospel of James (or "Infancy Gospel of James"), a work of the 2nd century, also presents itself as written by James – so that his authorship would lend authority.

In a 4th-century letter pseudographically ascribed to the 1st-century Clement of Rome, James was called the "bishop of bishops, who rules Jerusalem, the Holy Church of the Hebrews, and all the Churches everywhere".

== Relationship to Jesus, Mary and Joseph ==
Jesus's brothers – James as well as Jude, Simon, and Joses – are named in Matthew 13:55 and Mark 6:3 and mentioned elsewhere. James's name always appears first in lists, which suggests he was the eldest among them. In Jewish Antiquities (20.9.1), Josephus describes James as "the brother of Jesus who is called Christ".

Interpretation of the phrase "brother of the Lord" and similar phrases is divided between those who believe that Mary had additional children after Jesus (e.g., historian Charles Freeman) and those who hold the perpetual virginity of Mary (Catholics, Eastern Orthodox, and some Protestants, such as many Anglicans and some Lutherans). The only Catholic doctrine which has been defined regarding the "brothers of the Lord" is that they are not biological children of Mary.

Near-contemporary sources insist that James was a "perpetual virgin" from the womb, a term which according to Robert Eisenman was later converted to his mother, Mary.

=== Possible identity as younger half-brother, son of Mary and Joseph ===
Some writers, such as R.V. Tasker and D. Hill, interpret the Matthew 1:25 statement that Joseph "knew her not until she had brought forth her firstborn son" as meaning that Joseph and Mary did have normal marital relations after Jesus's birth, and that James, Joses, Jude, and Simon, were the natural sons of Mary and Joseph and, thus, half brothers of Jesus. Others, such as K. Beyer, point out that the Greek ἕως οὗ ('until') after a negative "often has no implication at all about what happened after the limit of the 'until' was reached". American biblical scholar Raymond E. Brown also argues that "the immediate context favors a lack of future implication here, for Matthew is concerned only with stressing Mary's virginity before the child's birth".

In addition, Mary, Joseph, and Jesus's brothers or siblings are often described together, without reference to any other relatives (Matthew 12:46–49, Mark 3:31–34, Mark 6:3, Luke 8:19–21, John 2:12, Acts 1:14), and Jesus's brothers are described without allusion to others (John 7:2–5, 1 Corinthians 9:5. For example, Matthew 13:55–56 says, "Isn't this the carpenter's son? Isn't his mother's name Mary, and aren't his brothers James, Joseph, Simon, and Jude? Aren't all his sisters with us?" and John 7:5 says, "Even his own brothers did not believe in him."

Tertullian (c. 160 – c. 220), Bonosus of Nairus and Helvidius (c. 380) were among the theologians who thought that Mary had children other than Jesus. Jerome asserts in his tract The Perpetual Virginity of Blessed Mary, as an answer to Helvidius, that the term "first-born" was used to refer to any offspring that opened the womb, rather than definitely implying other children. The Gospel of Luke's reporting of the visit of Mary, Joseph, and Jesus to the Temple of Jerusalem when Jesus was 12 years old makes no reference to any of Jesus's half-brothers.

American biblical scholar Robert Eisenman is of the belief that Luke, as a close follower of Pauline Gentile Christianity, sought to minimize the importance of Jesus's family by whatever means possible, editing James and Jesus's brothers out of the Gospel record. Catholic apologist Karl Keating argues that Mary and Joseph rushed without hesitation straight back to Jerusalem, when they realized Jesus was lost, which they would surely have thought twice about doing if there were other children (Jesus's siblings) to look after.

=== Possible identity as older stepbrother, son of Joseph by an earlier marriage ===
The Gospel of James (a 2nd-century apocryphal gospel also called the Protoevangelium of James or the Infancy Gospel of James) says that Mary was betrothed to Joseph and that he already had children. In this case, James was one of Joseph's children from his previous marriage and, therefore, Jesus's stepbrother.

The bishop of Salamis, Epiphanius, wrote too in his work The Panarion (374–375 AD) that "...James (brother of Jesus) was Joseph's son by Joseph's first wife, not by Mary..." He adds that Joseph became the father of James and his three brothers (Joses, Simeon, Judah) and two sisters (a Salome and a Mary or a Salome and an Anna) with James being the elder sibling. James and his siblings were not children of Mary but were Joseph's children from a previous marriage. After Joseph's first wife died, many years later when he was eighty, "he took Mary (mother of Jesus)". According to Epiphanius, the Scriptures call them "brothers of the Lord" to confound their opponents.

One argument supporting this view is that it would have been against Jewish custom for Jesus to give his mother to the care of John (who is not at all suspected to be a blood relative of Jesus) if Mary had other living sons. This is because the eldest son would take responsibility for his mother after the death of her husband; any other sons of Mary should have taken on this responsibility if they existed, therefore arguing against a direct natural brother relationship.

Also, Aramaic and Hebrew tended to use circumlocutions to point out blood relationships; it is asserted that just calling some people "brothers of Jesus" would not have necessarily implied the same mother. Rather, something like "sons of the mother of Jesus" would have been used to indicate a common mother. Scholars and theologians who assert this point out that Jesus was called "the son of Mary" rather than "a son of Mary" in his hometown (Mark 6:3).

=== Possible identity as cousin, son of a sister of Mary ===
James, along with the others named brothers of Jesus, are said by others to have been Jesus's cousins. This is justified by the fact that cousins were also called brothers and sisters in Jesus's native language, Aramaic, which, like Biblical Hebrew, does not contain a word for cousin. Furthermore, the Greek words adelphos and adelphe were not restricted to the meaning of a literal brother or sister in the Bible, nor were their plurals. On the other hand, unlike some other New Testament authors, the apostle Paul had a perfect command of Greek, a language which has a specific word for 'cousin' and another for 'brother' calling James "the brother of our Lord" (Galatians 1:19).

Eusebius (c. 275 – c. 339) reports the tradition that James the Just was the son of Joseph's brother Clopas and therefore was of the brothers (which he interprets as cousin) of Jesus described in the New Testament. This is echoed by Jerome (c. 342 – c. 419) in De Viris Illustribus ("On Illustrious Men") – James is said to be the son of another Mary, wife of Clopas and the sister of Mary, the mother of Jesus – in the following manner:

James, who is called the brother of the Lord, surnamed the Just, the son of Joseph by another wife, as some think, but, as appears to me, the son of Mary, sister of the mother of our Lord of whom John makes mention in his book...

Jerome refers to the scene of the crucifixion in John 19:25, where three women named Mary – Mary, the mother of Jesus, Mary of Clopas, and Mary Magdalene – are said to be witnesses. John also mentions the sister of the mother of Jesus, often identified with Mary of Clopas due to grammar. Mary "of Clopas" is often interpreted as Mary, "wife of Clopas". Mary of Nazareth and Mary of Clopas also need not be literally sisters, in light of the usage of the said words in Greek, Hebrew and Aramaic.

Mary of Clopas is suggested to be the same as "Mary, the mother of James the younger and Joses", "Mary the mother of James and Joseph" and the "other Mary" in Jesus's crucifixion and post-resurrection accounts in the Synoptic Gospels. Proponents of this identification argue that the writers of the Synoptics would have called this Mary, simply, "the mother of Jesus" if she was indeed meant to be the mother of Jesus, given the importance of her son's crucifixion and resurrection: they also note that the mother of James and Joses is called "Maria", whereas the mother of Jesus is "Mariam" or "Marias" in Greek. These proponents find it unlikely that Mary would be referred to by her natural children other than Jesus at such a significant time (James happens to be the brother of one Joses, as spelled in Mark, or Joseph, as in Matthew). (Note: This position is articulated in footnotes of the Christian Community Bible, published by Claretian Communications.)

Jerome's opinion suggests an identification of James the Just with the Apostle James, son of Alphaeus; Clopas and Alphaeus are thought to be different Greek renderings of the same Aramaic name Khalphai. Despite this, some biblical scholars tend to distinguish them; this is also not Catholic dogma, though a traditional teaching.

Since this Clopas is, according to Eusebius, Joseph of Nazareth's brother (see above) and Mary of Clopas is said to be Mary of Nazareth's sister, James could be related to Jesus by blood and law.

=== Possible identity as younger half-brother, son of Mary and a second husband ===
A variant on this is presented by James Tabor, who argues that after the early and childless death of Joseph, Mary married Clopas, whom he accepts as a younger brother of Joseph, according to the Levirate law. According to this view, Clopas fathered James and the later siblings, but not Jesus.

John Dominic Crossan suggested that James was probably Jesus's older brother.

== Identification with James, son of Alpheus, and with James the Less ==
A Mary is also mentioned as the mother of James, the Younger and of Joseph in the Gospel of Mark:

Some women were watching from a distance. Among them were Mary Magdalene, Mary the mother of James the Younger and of Joseph, and Salome. (Mark 15:40)

On the other hand, another Mary is mentioned as the mother of a James and of a Joseph in the Gospel of Matthew and in the Gospel of Mark:

When the Sabbath was over, Mary Magdalene, Mary the mother of James, and Salome bought spices so that they might go to anoint Jesus's body. (Mark 16:1)

Among them were Mary Magdalene, Mary the mother of James and Joseph, and the mother of Zebedee's sons. (Matthew 27:56)

Catholic interpretation generally holds that James, the Younger is the same James mentioned in Mark 16:1 and Matthew 27:56 and it is to be identified with James, the son of Alphaeus and James, the brother of Jesus. According to the Catholic Encyclopedia, he is not identified with James the Great, although this is disputed by some.

=== Possible identity with James, son of Alphaeus ===
Jerome believed that the brothers of the Lord were Jesus's cousins, thus amplifying the doctrine of perpetual virginity. Jerome concluded that James "the brother of the Lord", (Galatians 1:19) is therefore James, son of Alphaeus, one of the Twelve Apostles of Jesus, and the son of Mary Cleophas.

In two small but potentially important works of Hippolytus, On the Twelve Apostles of Christ and On the Seventy Apostles of Christ, he relates the following:

And James the son of Alphaeus, when preaching in Jerusalem was stoned to death by the Jews, and was buried there beside the temple.

These two works of Hippolytus are often neglected because the manuscripts were lost during most of the church age and then found in Greece in the 19th century. As most scholars consider them spurious, they are often ascribed to Pseudo-Hippolytus. The two are included in an appendix to the works of Hippolytus in the voluminous collection of Early Church Fathers.

Thus James, the brother of the Lord would be the son of Alphaeus, who is the husband of Mary the wife of Cleophas or Mary the wife of Alphaeus. The identification of James as the son of Alpheus was perpetuated into the 13th century in the hagiography The Golden Legend by Jacobus de Voragine.

=== Possible identity with James the Less ===
Jerome also claimed that James "the brother of the Lord" is the same as James the Less. To explain this, Jerome first tells that James the Less must be identified with James, the son of Alphaeus, and reports in his work The Perpetual Virginity of Blessed Mary the following:

Do you intend the comparatively unknown James the Less, who is called in Scripture the son of Mary, not however of Mary the mother of our Lord, to be an apostle, or not? If he is an apostle, he must be the son of Alphæus and a believer in Jesus.

The only conclusion is that the Mary, who is described as the mother of James the Less was the wife of Alphæus and sister of Mary the Lord's mother, the one who is called by John the Evangelist "Mary of Clopas".

After saying that James the Less is the same as James, the son of Mary of Cleophas, wife of Alphaeus and sister of Mary the Lord's mother, Jerome describes in his work De Viris Illustribus that James "the brother of the Lord" is the same as James, the son of Alpaheus and Mary of Cleophas:

James, who is called the brother of the Lord, surnamed the Just, the son of Joseph by another wife, as some think, but, as appears to me, the son of Mary sister of the mother our Lord Mary of Cleophas of whom John makes mention in his book (John 19:25).

Thus, Jerome concludes that James, the son of Alphaeus, James the Less, and James, brother of the Lord, are one and the same person.

=== Other relationships ===
Also, Jesus and James could be related in some other way, not strictly "cousins", following the non-literal application of the term adelphos and the Aramaic term for 'brother'. According to the apocryphal First Apocalypse of James, James is not the earthly brother of Jesus, but a spiritual brother who according to the Gnostics "received secret knowledge from Jesus prior to the Passion".

== Death ==
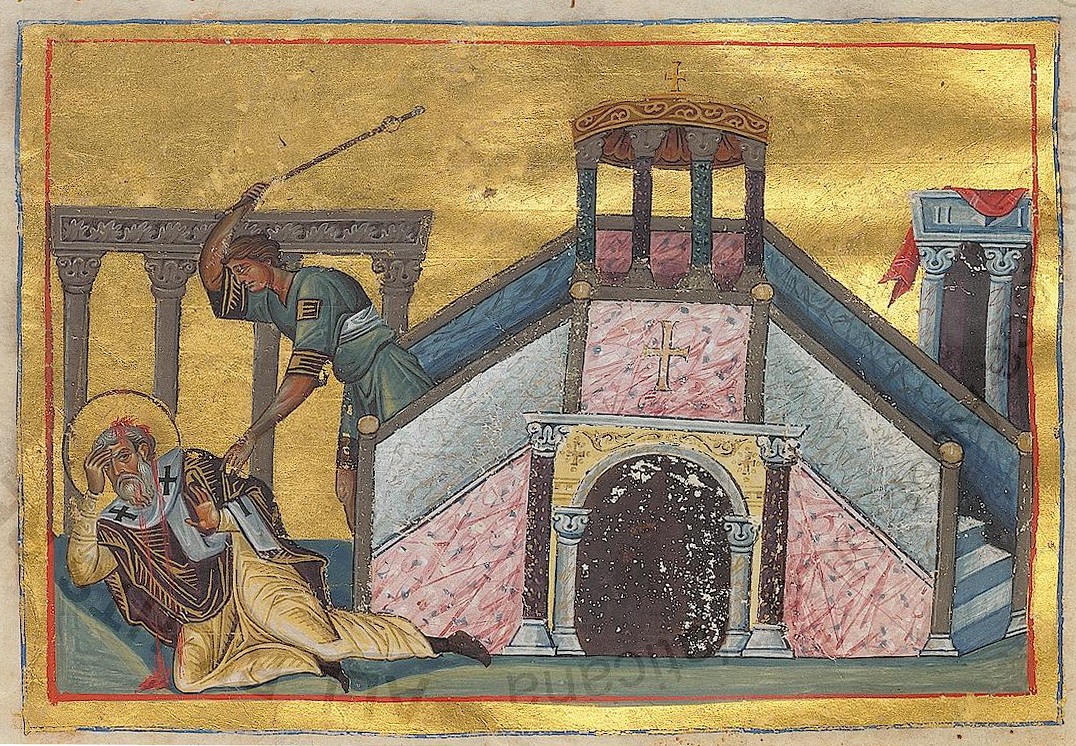
Martyrdom of James the Just in Menologion of Basil II, a manuscript dating from the late 10th or early 11th century

In Josephus' Antiquities of the Jews, James is identified one time in exactly one passage (20.9.1): "the brother of Jesus, who was called Christ, whose name was James, and some others" met their death after the death of the procurator Porcius Festus but before Lucceius Albinus had assumed office – which has been dated to 62. The High Priest Hanan ben Hanan (Ananus ben Ananus) took advantage of this lack of imperial oversight to assemble a Sanhedrin (literally a synhedrion kriton in Greek, a "Sanhedrin of judges"), which condemned James and others "on the charge of breaking the law", then had them executed by stoning (Antiquities 20.9.1). Josephus reports that Hanan's act was widely viewed as little more than judicial murder. This offended a number of "those who were considered the most fair-minded people in the city, and strict in their observance of the Law", who went so far as to arrange a meeting with Albinus as he entered the province in order to petition him successfully about the matter. In response, King Agrippa II replaced Ananus with Jesus son of Damneus.

Clement of Alexandria relates that "James was thrown from the pinnacle of the Temple, and was beaten to death with a club".

Hegesippus cites that "the Scribes and Pharisees placed James upon the pinnacle of the temple, and threw down the just man, and they began to stone him, for he was not killed by the fall. And one of them, who was a fuller, took the club with which he beat out clothes and struck the just man on the head".

Origen related an account of the death of James which gave it as a cause of the Roman siege of Jerusalem, something not found in the existing manuscripts of Josephus.

Eusebius wrote that "the more sensible even of the Jews were of the opinion that this (James' death) was the cause of the siege of Jerusalem, which happened to them immediately after his martyrdom for no other reason than their daring act against him. In Church History Book II, 23.20, Eusebius reports: 'Josephus, at least, has not hesitated to testify this in his writings, where he says, "These things happened to the Jews to avenge James the Just, who was a brother of Jesus, that is called the Christ. For the Jews slew him, although he was a most just man." '

Eusebius, while quoting Josephus' missing account, also records otherwise lost passages from Hegesippus (see links below) and Clement of Alexandria (Historia Ecclesiae, 2.23). Hegesippus' account varies somewhat from what Josephus reports and may be an attempt to reconcile the various accounts by combining them. According to Hegesippus, the scribes and Pharisees came to James for help in putting down Christian beliefs. The record says:

They came, therefore, in a body to James, and said: "We entreat thee, restrain the people: for they have gone astray in their opinions about Jesus, as if he were the Christ. We entreat thee to persuade all who have come hither for the day of the passover, concerning Jesus. For we all listen to thy persuasion; since we, as well as all the people, bear thee testimony that thou art just, and showest partiality to none. Do thou, therefore, persuade the people not to entertain erroneous opinions concerning Jesus: for all the people, and we also, listen to thy persuasion. Take thy stand, then, upon the summit of the temple, that from that elevated spot thou mayest be clearly seen, and thy words may be plainly audible to all the people. For, in order to attend the passover, all the tribes have congregated hither, and some of the Gentiles also." To the scribes' and Pharisees' dismay, James boldly testified that "Christ himself sitteth in heaven, at the right hand of the Great Power, and shall come on the clouds of heaven". The scribes and pharisees then said to themselves, "We have not done well in procuring this testimony to Jesus. But let us go up and throw him down, that they may be afraid, and not believe him."

...Accordingly, the scribes and Pharisees threw down the just man... [and] began to stone him: for he was not killed by the fall; but he turned, and kneeled down, and said: "I beseech thee, Lord God our Father, forgive them; for they know not what they do."

And, while they were there, stoning him to death, one of the priests, the sons of Rechab, the son of Rechabim, to whom testimony is borne by Jeremiah the prophet, began to cry aloud, saying: "Cease, what do ye? The just man is praying for us." But one among them, one of the fullers, took the staff with which he was accustomed to wring out the garments he dyed, and hurled it at the head of the just man.

And so he suffered martyrdom; and they buried him on the spot, and the pillar erected to his memory still remains, close by the temple. This man was a true witness to both Jews and Greeks that Jesus is the Christ. And shortly after Vespasian besieged Judaea, taking them captive.

— Fragments from the Acts of the Church; Concerning the Martyrdom of James, the Brother of the Lord, from Book 5.

Vespasian's siege and capture of Jerusalem delayed the selection of Simeon of Jerusalem to succeed James.

According to Philip Schaff in 1904, this account by "Hegesippus has been cited over and over again by historians as assigning the date of the martyrdom to 69", though he challenged the assumption that Hegesippus gives anything to denote such a date. Josephus does not mention in his writings how James was buried.

== Feast day ==
In the Catholic Church, the feast day of Philip the Apostle, along with that of James the Lesser (identified by Catholics as the same person as James the Just), was traditionally observed on 1 May, the anniversary of the church dedicated to them in Rome (now called the Church of the Twelve Apostles). Then this combined feast transferred to May 3 in the current ordinary calendar.

In the Eastern Orthodox Church, James is commemorated as "Apostle James the Just, brother of Our Lord", and as such, multiple days are assigned to his feasts. His first feast day in the church calendar year is on October 23. His next feast day is on the first Sunday after the feast of the Nativity, where he is commemorated with King David and Joseph the Betrothed. His final feast day is on January 4 among the Seventy Apostles. He is also commemorated on 26 December (Synaxis of the Mother of God). On 1 December occurs commemoration of his, Simeon and Zacharias relics translation in 351, and 25 May is commemoration of their relics discover also in 351.

Recent versions of the Episcopal Church of the United States of America and Lutheran Church have added commemoration on the traditional Eastern Orthodox date of October 23.

James is remembered (with Philip) in the Church of England with a Festival on 1 May.

== Ossuary inscription ==
In the November 2002 issue of Biblical Archaeology Review, André Lemaire of the University of Paris published a report about an ossuary belonging to a collector named Oded Golan, and bearing the inscription "Ya'aqov bar Yosef achui d'Yeshua" ("James son of Joseph brother of Jesus"). The ossuary was exhibited at the Royal Ontario Museum in Toronto later that year. On June 18, 2003, the Israel Antiquities Authority published a report concluding, based on an analysis of the patina, that the inscription is a modern forgery. Specifically, it appeared that the inscription had been added recently and made to look old by the application of a chemical solution. Following this, the ossuary was removed by the Royal Ontario Museum.

On December 29, 2004, Golan was indicted in an Israeli court along with three other men – Robert Deutsch, an inscriptions expert who teaches at Haifa University; collector Shlomo Cohen; and antiquities dealer Faiz al-Amaleh. They were accused of being part of a forgery ring that had been operating for more than 20 years. Golan denied the charges against him. According to the BBC, "when the police took Oded Golan into custody and searched his apartment they discovered a workshop with a range of tools, materials, and half finished 'antiquities'. This was evidence for a fraud of a scale far greater than they had suspected." On March 14, 2012, Golan was declared not guilty of all charges of forgery, although with the judge saying this acquittal "does not mean that the inscription on the ossuary is authentic or that it was written 2,000 years ago" and "it was not proven in any way that the words 'the brother of Jesus' necessarily refer to the 'Jesus' who appears in Christian writings" and that there is "nothing in these findings which necessarily proves that the items were authentic".

The Israeli Antiquities Authority and several scholars still maintain that the James Ossuary is a modern forgery, and the artefact is not usually quoted by scholars of the historical Jesus.

== Relationships between Christians and the Roman Empire ==
According to the Italian historian Marta Sordi, evidence of the good relations between the Roman Empire and the early Christian communities up to 62 AD, and of Roman protection against anti-Jewish sentiment, is provided by the fact that the governor Lucius Albinus, who succeeded Porcius Festus, was deposed by King Herod Agrippa II under pressure from Rome, immediately after the death of James the Less. This has been linked to what happened after the stoning of Saint Stephen, the first martyr.

== See also ==
- Divine Liturgy of Saint James
- List of biblical figures identified in extra-biblical sources
- Related Bible parts: Matthew 13, Matthew 27, Mark 6, Mark 15, Mark 16, Acts 12, Acts 15, Acts 21, 1 Corinthians 15, Galatians 1, Galatians 2; James 1; Epistle of Jude

== Bibliography ==
- Richard Bauckham. James: Wisdom of James, disciple of Jesus the sage. London: Routledge, 1999. ISBN 0-415-10369-X (-3); Jude and the Relatives of Jesus in the Early Church. London: T & T Clark, 1990, 2004. ISBN 0-567-08297-0 (paperback).
- Bauckham, Richard (1999). "For What Offense was James put to Death?". In Chilton, Bruce; Evans, Craig A. (eds.). James the Just and Christian origins. BRILL. pp. 199–232. ISBN 978-90-04-11550-7.
- Raymond E. Brown. An Introduction to the New Testament. New York: Doubleday, 1997. ISBN 0-385-24767-2
- Robert Eisenman; James the Brother of Jesus: The Key to Unlocking the Secrets of Early Christianity and the Dead Sea Scrolls, Viking Penguin, 1997.
- Feldman, Louis H.; Hata, Gōhei, eds. (1987). Josephus, Judaism and Christianity. BRILL. ISBN 978-90-04-08554-1.
- Flavius Josephus; Maier, Paul L. (December 1995). Josephus, the essential works: a condensation of Jewish antiquities and The Jewish war. Kregel Academic. ISBN 978-0-8254-3260-6.
- Freedman, David Noel; Myers, Allen C.; Beck, Astrid B., eds. (2000). Eerdmans Dictionary of the Bible. Wm. B. Eerdmans Publishing Co. ISBN 90-5356-503-5.
- Harding, Mark (2003). Early Christian Life and Thought in Social Context. Sheffield Academic Press. ISBN 0-8264-5604-9.
- Mitchell, Margaret M.; Young, Frances M. (2006). The Cambridge History of Christianity, Volume 1: Origins to Constantine. Cambridge University Press. ISBN 0-521-81239-9.
- Neale, John Mason (2003). A History of the Holy Eastern Church. Gorgias Press. ISBN 1-59333-045-6.
- Painter, John (2004). "Who was James?". In Chilton, Bruce; Neusner, Jacob (eds.). The brother of Jesus: James the Just and his mission. Liturgical Press. ISBN 0-8146-5152-6.
- Painter, John (2005). Just James: The Brother of Jesus in History and Tradition. Bloomsbury Academic. ISBN 0-567-04191-3.
- Hershel Shanks and Ben Witherington, The Brother of Jesus. New York: HarperSanFrancisco, 2003. ISBN 0-06-055660-9
- Van Voorst, Robert E. (2000). Jesus Outside the New Testament: An Introduction to the Ancient Evidence. Wm. B. Eerdmans Publishing Co. ISBN 0-8028-4368-9.
- Francis Watson. Paul, Judaism and the Gentiles. Cultural background.
- Jonathan Bourgel, "James the Just, One Among Many Oblias", NTS 59 (2013), 222–46, (French).
- Biblical Archaeology Review Articles in various issues in 2004 and 2005 concerning the ossuary.
