= Cleopas =

1st-century Christian and saint

Saint Cleopas the Apostle
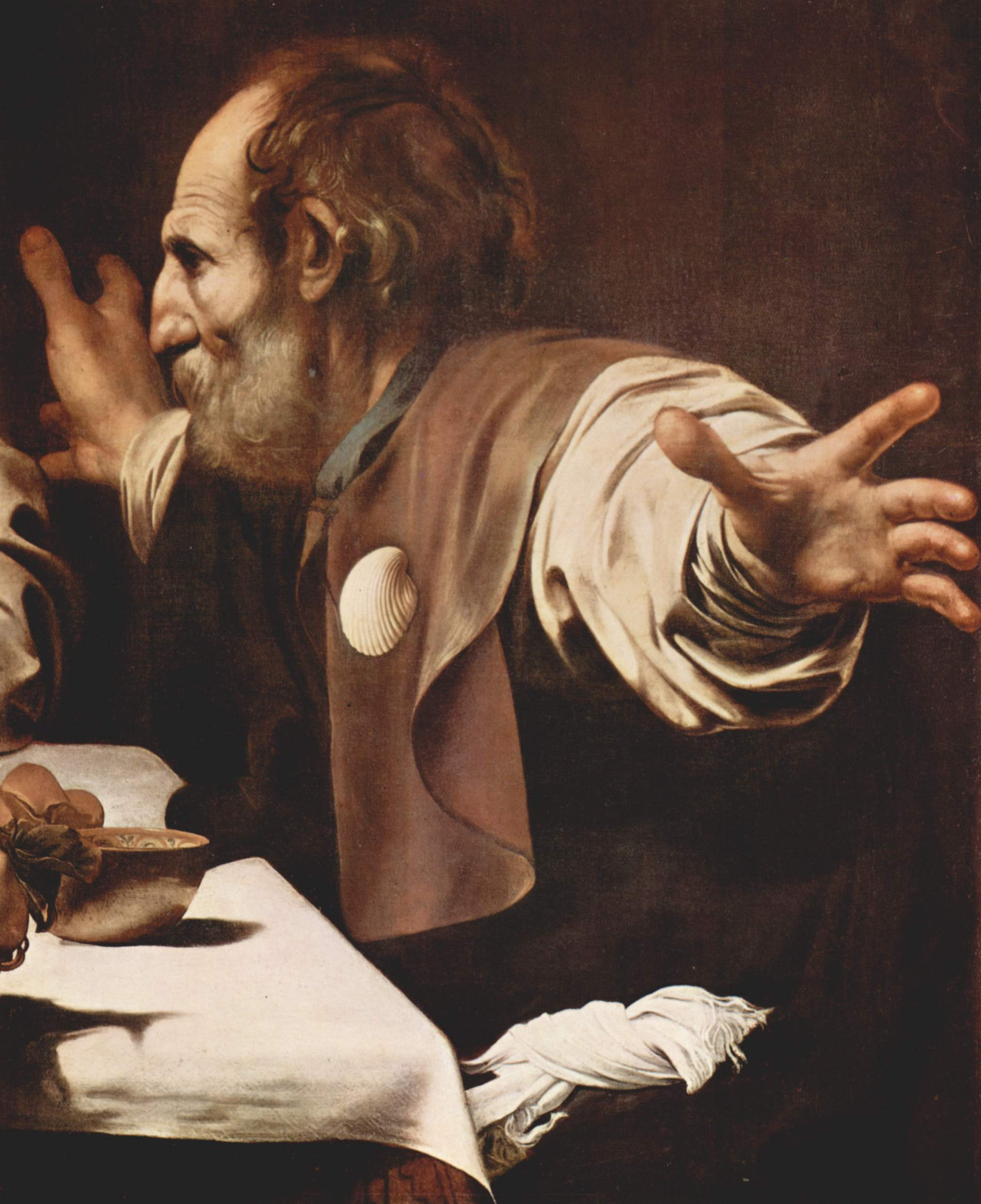
- Cleopas from the Supper at Emmaus by Caravaggio, London, 1601

Apostle Disciple of the Seventy
- Born: 1st century BC
- Died: 1st century
- Venerated in: Eastern Orthodox Church; Oriental Orthodox Church; Catholic Church
- Feast: 25 September (Roman Catholic); 30 October (Eastern Orthodox); 10 November (Coptic Orthodox)

Cleopas (/ˈkliːoʊpəs/; Greek: Κλεοπάς, romanized: Kleopas), also spelled Cleophas, was a figure of early Christianity, one of the two disciples who encountered Jesus during the Road to Emmaus appearance in Luke 24:13–32.

== Etymology ==
Some writers claim that the name Clopas in John 19:25 ("Mary of Clopas", "Κλωπᾶς") is a Hellenized form of a claimed Aramaic name "Qlopha" (קלופא), and that Cleopas' name ("Κλεόπας") is an abbreviated form of "Cleopatros" (Κλεόπατρος), a Greek name meaning "glory of the father" (best known in the feminine form Cleopatra).

Catholic and Eastern Orthodox traditions hold that Clopas, believed to be the brother of Saint Joseph, is the same person as Cleopas. Others consider that Clophas, Cleophas and Alphaeus are all the same name.

== Account in the Gospel of Luke ==
Cleopas appears in Luke 24:13–31 as one of two disciples walking from Jerusalem to Emmaus. Cleopas is named in verse 18, while his companion remains unnamed.

This occurs three days after the crucifixion, on the same day as the Resurrection of Jesus. The two travelers have heard the tomb of Jesus was found empty earlier that day, but have not yet believed the women's testimony. They are discussing the events of the past few days when a stranger asks them what they are discussing. "Their eyes were kept from recognizing him." He rebukes them for their unbelief and offers them an interpretation of scriptural prophecies concerning the Messiah. They ask the stranger to join them for the evening meal. When he breaks the bread "their eyes were opened" and they recognize him as the resurrected Jesus. Jesus immediately vanishes.

Cleopas and his friend hasten back to Jerusalem to carry the news to the other disciples, and learn Jesus has also appeared to [one of] them. The same event is recorded in Mark 16:12–13.

== Apocryphal books ==
The Gospel of Pseudo-Matthew, which was probably written in the seventh century, states that Mary of Clopas was daughter of Clopas and Anna:

Jesus met them, with Mary His mother, along with her sister Mary of Clopas, whom the Lord God had given to her father Clopas and her mother Anna, because they had offered Mary the mother of Jesus to the Lord. And she was called by the same name, Mary, for the consolation of her parents.

The most common interpretation is that "of Clopas" indicates the husband of Mary of Clopas and subsequently the father of her children, but some see "of Clopas" as meaning this Mary's father. Medieval tradition saw Clopas as the second husband of Saint Anne and the father of "Mary of Clopas".

Catholic and Eastern Orthodox traditions believed that Clopas is a brother of Saint Joseph, and that he is the same person with Cleophas.

== Traditions ==
Cleopas has no further occurrence in the New Testament, but in tradition he has often been identified with Clopas, another New Testament figure mentioned in John's Gospel.

The historian, Bishop Eusebius of Caesarea, quotes the earlier chronicler, Hegesippus, who wrote, c. AD 180, that he had years before interviewed the grandsons of Jude the Apostle and learned that Clopas was the brother of Joseph, husband of the Virgin Mary: "After the martyrdom of James, it was unanimously decided that Simeon, son of Clopas, was worthy to occupy the see of Jerusalem. He was, it is said, a cousin of the Saviour." Hegesippus noted that Clopas was a brother of Joseph. Epiphanius adds that Joseph and Cleopas were brothers, sons of "Jacob, surnamed Panther".

According to the surviving fragments of the work Exposition of the Sayings of the Lord of the Apostolic Father Papias of Hierapolis, who lived c. 70–163 AD, Cleophas and Alphaeus are the same person: "Mary the wife of Cleophas or Alphaeus, who was the mother of James the bishop and apostle, and of Simon and Thaddeus, and of one Joseph". The Anglican theologian J.B. Lightfoot regarded the fragment quoted above as coming from Papias the Lexicographer.

Cleopas is remembered on 30 October in the Eastern Orthodox Church, commemorated on 25 September in the latest official edition of the Roman Martyrology, and on 10 November in the Coptic Orthodox Church.

The entry in the Roman Martyrology now summarizes in substance Luke's account of the Emmaus encounter with Jesus.
