= Pseudo-Andrew of Crete =

Pseudo-Andrew of Crete is the name used by scholars for the anonymous authors of a number of Greek writings that were falsely attributed to Saint Andrew of Crete.

The Life and Martyrdom of Saint James the Apostle and Brother of the Lord is a biography of James, brother of Jesus. It was written between 550 and 900, most likely in Palestine between 610 and 640, and was originally anonymous, only later being attributed to Andrew. It is known from at least eleven Greek manuscripts and an Old Russian translation. Its main source is Eusebius of Caesarea and all of its material is derived from written sources. Its value to the textual criticism of the New Testament stems from its extensive quotations from the Epistle of James. It is the source for the entry on James in Symeon Metaphrastes.

Andrew of Crete's name was also attached to an iconodule treatise of the late 8th century, On the Veneration of Divine Images. It is fragmentary.
