= Jude, brother of Jesus =

Member of Jesus' family according to the New Testament

Jude (alternatively Judas or Judah; Ancient Greek: Ἰούδας) was one of the "brothers" of Jesus according to the New Testament. He is sometimes identified with Jude the Apostle. Catholics hold that Jude was a cousin, but not literally the brother of Jesus, while the Eastern Orthodox hold that Jude is St. Joseph's son from a previous marriage (Jesus's step brother). Jude is traditionally identified as the author of the Epistle of Jude, a short epistle which is reckoned among the seven general epistles of the New Testament placed after Paul's epistles and before the Book of Revelation and considered canonical by Christians, although modern scholars tend to reject his authorship of the epistle.

== "Brother of Jesus" ==
Mark 6:3 and Matthew 13:55 record the people of Nazareth saying of Jesus: "Is not this the carpenter, the son of Mary, the brother of James, and Joses, and of Judas, and Simon? and are not his sisters here with us?". Catholics, Eastern Orthodox, and some Protestant groups believe that the "brothers of Jesus" are not biological children of Mary, but step-brothers or cousins, and that Mary remained a virgin her entire life. Some Protestants, including R. V. Tasker and D. Hill, generally relate these brothers and sisters to the Matthew 1:25 indication that Joseph "did not know her till she had brought forth her firstborn Son" and the implication that Joseph and Mary had customary marital relations thereafter (simply put, Mary and Joseph had children but Mary conceived and birthed Jesus as a virgin). But K. Beyer points out that Greek ἕως οὗ ('until') after a negative "often has no implication at all about what happened after the limit of the 'until' was reached".

== Attribution of Jude ==
The Epistle of Jude has been attributed to him, on the basis of the heading "Jude, the servant of Jesus Christ, and brother of James" (Jude 1:1) where "brother of James" is taken as brother of James the brother of Jesus.

Clement of Alexandria who lived c. 150–215 AD wrote in his work "Comments on the Epistle of Jude" that Jude, the Epistle of Jude's author was a son of Joseph and a brother of the Lord (without specifying whether he is a son of Joseph by a previous marriage or of Joseph and Mary)

Jude, who wrote the Catholic Epistle, the brother of the sons of Joseph, and very religious, while knowing the near relationship of the Lord, yet did not say that he himself was His brother. But what said he? "Jude, a servant of Jesus Christ,"—of Him as Lord; but "the brother of James." For this is true; he was His brother, (the son) of Joseph.

According to the surviving fragments of the work Exposition of the Sayings of the Lord of the Apostolic Father Papias of Hierapolis, who lived c. 70–163 AD, Mary the wife of Cleophas or Alphaeus would be the mother of Jude, the brother of Jesus that Papias identifies with Thaddeus:

Mary the wife of Cleophas or Alphaeus, who was the mother of James the bishop and apostle, and of Simon and Thaddeus, and of one Joseph...(Fragment X)

However, the above fragment is properly attributed by J.B. Lightfoot to a different Papias, an 11th century Latin lexicographer. The quotation is found in this Papias' Elementarium Doctrinae Rudimentum.

The bishop of Salamis, Epiphanius, wrote in his work The Panarion (AD 374–375) that Joseph became the father of James and his three brothers (Joses, Simeon, Judah) and two sisters (a Salome and a Mary) or (a Salome and an Anna) with James being the elder sibling. James and his siblings were not children of Mary but were Joseph's children from a previous marriage. After Joseph's first wife died, many years later when he was eighty, "he took Mary (mother of Jesus)".

=== Alternative attribution ===
Both "Judas" and "Jude" are English translations of the Greek name Ἰούδας, which was a widespread name in the 1st century. Over the years, Jude's identity has been questioned, and confusion persists among biblical scholars. It is not clear if Jude (the brother of Jesus), is the same person as Jude (the brother of James), or the Apostle Jude,

There is an Apostle Jude in some lists of the Twelve, listed as "Jude of James". The name "Jude of James", is sometimes interpreted as "Jude, brother of James", though such a construction commonly denotes a relationship of father and son. In the Gospels of Mark and Matthew his name is replaced with "Thaddeus", due to this, Jude the Apostle is commonly identified with Thaddeus. His nickname may have occurred due to a resemblance to Jesus or to avoid confusion between Jude and Judas Iscariot. Although a local tradition of eastern Syria identifies the Apostle Jude with Thomas.

== Descendants ==
Hegesippus, a 2nd-century Christian writer, mentions descendants of Jude living in the reign of Domitian (81-96). Eusebius relates in his Historia Ecclesiae (Book III, ch. 19–20):

But when this same Domitian had commanded that the descendants of David should be slain, an ancient tradition says that some of the heretics brought accusation against the descendants of Jude (said to have been a brother of the Saviour according to the flesh), on the ground that they were of the lineage of David and were related to Christ himself. Hegesippus relates these facts in the following words.

"Of the family of the Lord there were still living the grandchildren of Jude, who is said to have been the Lord's brother according to the flesh.
"Information was given that they belonged to the family of David, and they were brought to the Emperor Domitian by the Evocatus. For Domitian feared the coming of Christ as Herod also had feared it. And he asked them if they were descendants of David, and they confessed that they were. Then he asked them how much property they had, or how much money they owned. And both of them answered that they had only nine thousand denarii, half of which belonged to each of them;
and this property did not consist of silver, but of a piece of land which contained only thirty-nine acres, and from which they raised their taxes and supported themselves by their own labor."

Then they showed their hands, exhibiting the hardness of their bodies and the callousness produced upon their hands by continuous toil as evidence of their own labor. And when they were asked concerning Christ and his kingdom, of what sort it was and where and when it was to appear, they answered that it was not a temporal nor an earthly kingdom, but a heavenly and angelic one, which would appear at the end of the world, when he should come in glory to judge the quick and the dead, and to give unto every one according to his works. Upon hearing this, Domitian did not pass judgment against them, but, despising them as of no account, he let them go, and by a decree put a stop to the persecution of the Church.

But when they were released they ruled the churches because they were witnesses and were also relatives of the Lord. And peace being established, they lived until the time of Trajan. These things are related by Hegesippus.

Eusebius also relates (in Book III, ch. 32,5f.), that they suffered martyrdom under the Emperor Trajan.

Epiphanius of Salamis, in his Panarion, mentions a Judah Kyriakos, great grandson of Jude, as last Jewish Bishop of Jerusalem, who was still living after the Bar Kokhba's revolt.

== See also ==
- Judas the Zealot, sometimes identified as the Apostle Jude
