= Brothers of Jesus =

Biblical figures described as brothers of Jesus

The brothers of Jesus or the adelphoi (Ancient Greek: ἀδελφοί, romanized: adelphoí, lit. 'of the same womb, brothers') (Note: Greek singular noun adelphos, from a- ("same", equivalent to homo-) and delphys ("womb," equivalent to splanchna).) are named in the New Testament as James, Joses (a form of Joseph), Simon, and Jude; unnamed sisters are mentioned in Mark and Matthew. They may have been:

1. sons of Mary, the mother of Jesus, and Joseph.
2. sons of Joseph by a former marriage.
3. sons of Mary of Clopas, named in Mark 15:40 as the "mother of James and Joses", who has been identified as either the sister of Mary, the mother of Jesus, or a sister-in-law to Joseph. (Note: According to Hegesippus, Clopas is Joseph's brother, therefore Mary, wife of Clopas, would be Joseph's sister-in-law.)

Those who uphold the perpetual virginity of Mary reject the idea of biological brethren and maintain that the brothers and sisters were either cousins of Jesus (option 3, the position of the Catholic Church) or children of Joseph from a previous marriage (option 2, the Eastern Orthodox Church). Some Lutheran churches have accepted both option 2 and option 3 as being valid explanations for the doctrine of the perpetual virginity of Mary.

== Etymology ==
According to context, the Greek plural noun ἀδελφοί (adelphoi), from a- ('same') and delphys ('womb'), may mean physical brothers, physical siblings, figurative brothers, or figurative siblings. Adelphoi sometimes means more than a blood brother, e.g., Rom 9:3 (kinsman); Matt 5:22–23 (neighbor); Mark 6:17–18 (step-brother). In such instances the context must determine the meaning. Adelphoi is distinct from anepsios, meaning cousin, nephew, niece, and this word is never used to describe James and the other siblings of Jesus. The word "anepsios" is only employed once in the entire New Testament, being used in Paul's Epistle to the Colossians. Although neither Hebrew nor Aramaic had a word for "cousin", both customarily spoke of a cousin as a "son of an uncle" (Hebrew: ben dod; Aramaic: bar dad) and the Septuagint, the Greek translation of the Old Testament, never translates either expression as "brother" or "sister".

The Vulgate renders with the Latin word frater (e.g. Mark 6:3), which, even in classical Latin, can also mean "maternal cousin" or "paternal cousin".

== Adelphoi (brethren) of Jesus ==
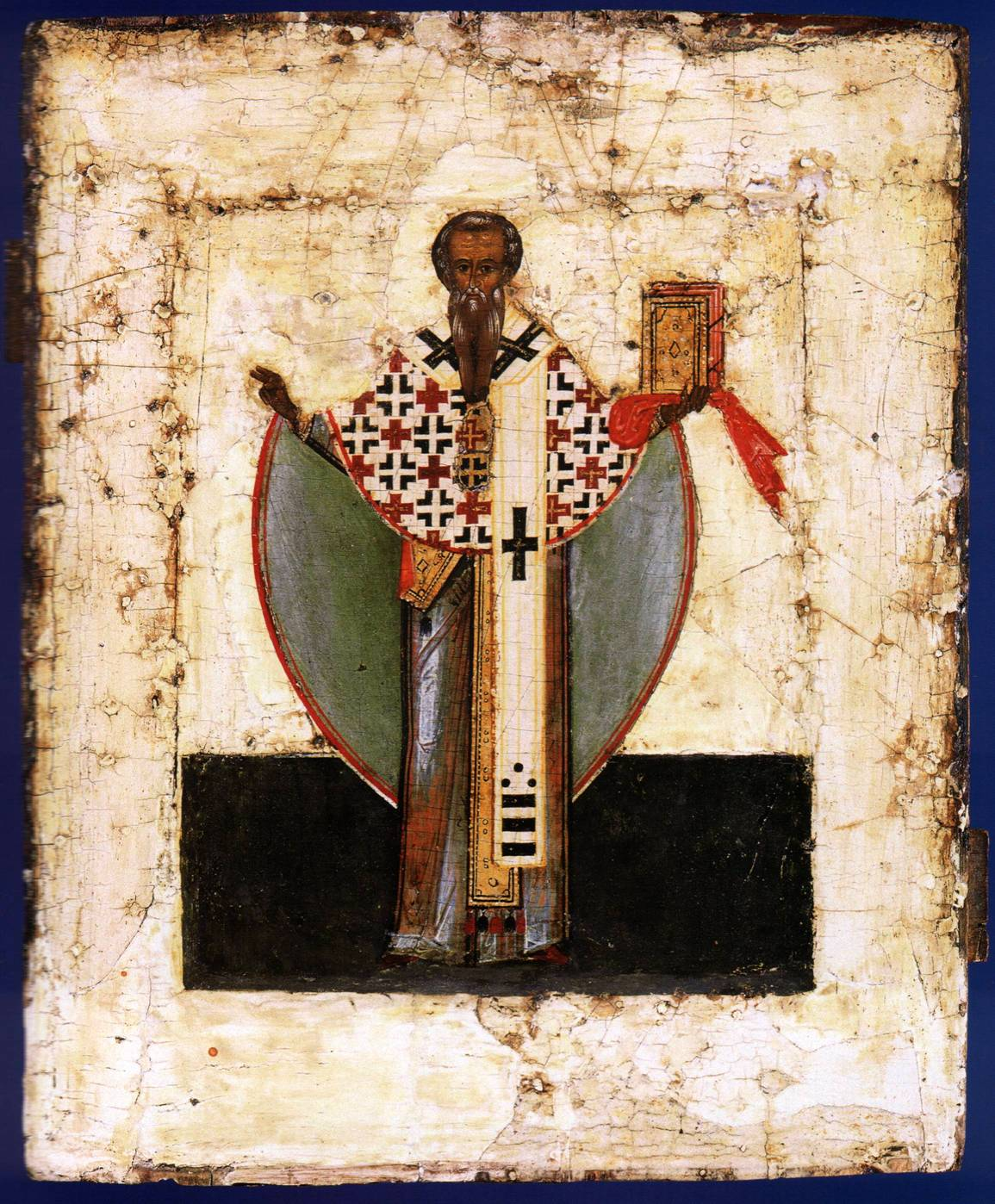
James the Just, 16th-century Russian icon

Mark 6:3 names James, Joses, Judas (conventionally known in English as Jude) and Simon as the brothers of Jesus, and Matthew 13:55, which probably used Mark as its source, gives the same names in different order, James, Joseph, Simon and Judas. "Joseph" is simply the longer form of "Joses", and so it appears that James was the eldest and Joses/Joseph the next, but as Matthew has reversed the order of the last two it is uncertain who was the youngest. Unnamed sisters are mentioned in Mark 6:3 and Matthew 13:56 and may be implied in Mark 3:35 and Matthew 12:46, but their number is unknown.

The gospels indicate a rift between Jesus and his brothers in the early part of his ministry (see Mark 3:31–35 and the parallel passages in Matthew 12:46–50 and Luke 8:19–21), and they never appear among his followers during his lifetime. John has Jesus's brothers advising him to go to Judea despite being aware that his life would be in danger, and they are absent from his burial, which should have been their responsibility, but they do appear in Acts 1:14 with the Eleven (i.e., the remaining disciples after the betrayal by Judas Iscariot): "These all (the Eleven) were persevering in prayer along with the women, with Mary the mother of Jesus, and with his brothers."

In 1 Corinthians 15:3–7 Paul lists a "James" among those to whom the risen Christ had appeared, and most scholars agree that this refers to James the brother of Jesus. Paul the Apostle personally knew James (Gal 1:19). The 2nd-century historian Hegesippus (c. 110–80 AD) reports that James the brother of Jesus came to be known as James the Just, and Eusebius of Caesarea (died 339) says that he spent so much of his life in prayer that his knees became "like the knees of a camel." According to Clement of Alexandria, reported by Eusebius, he was chosen as bishop of Jerusalem, and from the time when Peter left Jerusalem after Herod's attempt to kill him (Acts 12) he appears as the principal authority in the Jerusalem church, presiding at the Council of Jerusalem recorded in Acts 15. In Galatians 1:19 Paul tells how he went to Jerusalem a few years after his conversion and met Cephas (Peter) but no other apostles, only "James, the brother of the Lord"; Paul's Greek leaves it unclear whether he includes, or does not include, James among the apostles. He goes on to describe a second visit fourteen years later when he met the "pillars of the Church", James and Peter and John; James is mentioned first and seems to be the primary leader among these three. In chapter 2 he describes how he and Peter were later in Antioch and in the habit of dining with gentile Christians in breach of Jewish torah, until "certain people from James" came and Peter withdrew, "fearing those who belong to the circumcision." The 1st-century historian Josephus tells how James was martyred by the Jews in 62 AD on charges of breaking the Jewish Law.

Paul records in 1 Corinthians that the other brothers of Jesus (that is, other than James, who is portrayed as rooted in Jerusalem) travelled as evangelists, and that they were married ("Do we not have the right to be accompanied by a believing wife, as do the other apostles and the brothers of the Lord and Cephas (Peter)?" - 1 Corinthians 9:5). The 3rd century Apostolic Father Eusebius left a list of 12 bishops of the early church, of whom two, Joseph/Joses and Jude, may be the brothers of Jesus. The number of sisters and their names are not specified in the New Testament, but the apocryphal 3rd century Gospel of Philip mentions a Mary, and Salome, who appears in the late 2nd century Gospel of James, is arguably the other sister.

The author of the epistle of James introduces himself as "James, a servant of God and of the Lord Jesus Christ". He does not identify himself as the brother of Jesus or an apostle or a leader of the church in any way, but one recent study characterises this letter as "the most Jewish text in the New Testament". The epistle of Jude identifies its author as "Jude… the brother of James", but today there is widespread, although not unanimous, support for the view that it was composed in the early part of the 2nd century by an unknown author borrowing the name of the brother of Jesus. Hegesippus mentions a Simon or Simeon (the names are equivalent) who became leader of the Jerusalem church after the death of James, but makes this Simon a son of Clopas, the brother of Joseph.

Of the "brothers," however, no direct relationship to Mary or Joseph is ever indicated. Only Jesus is referred to as "son of Mary," "the son of Mary," or "son of Joseph." Only Jesus is the subject of the Old Testament messianic prophecies and only of him is the genealogy proposed.

== Relationship to Jesus ==
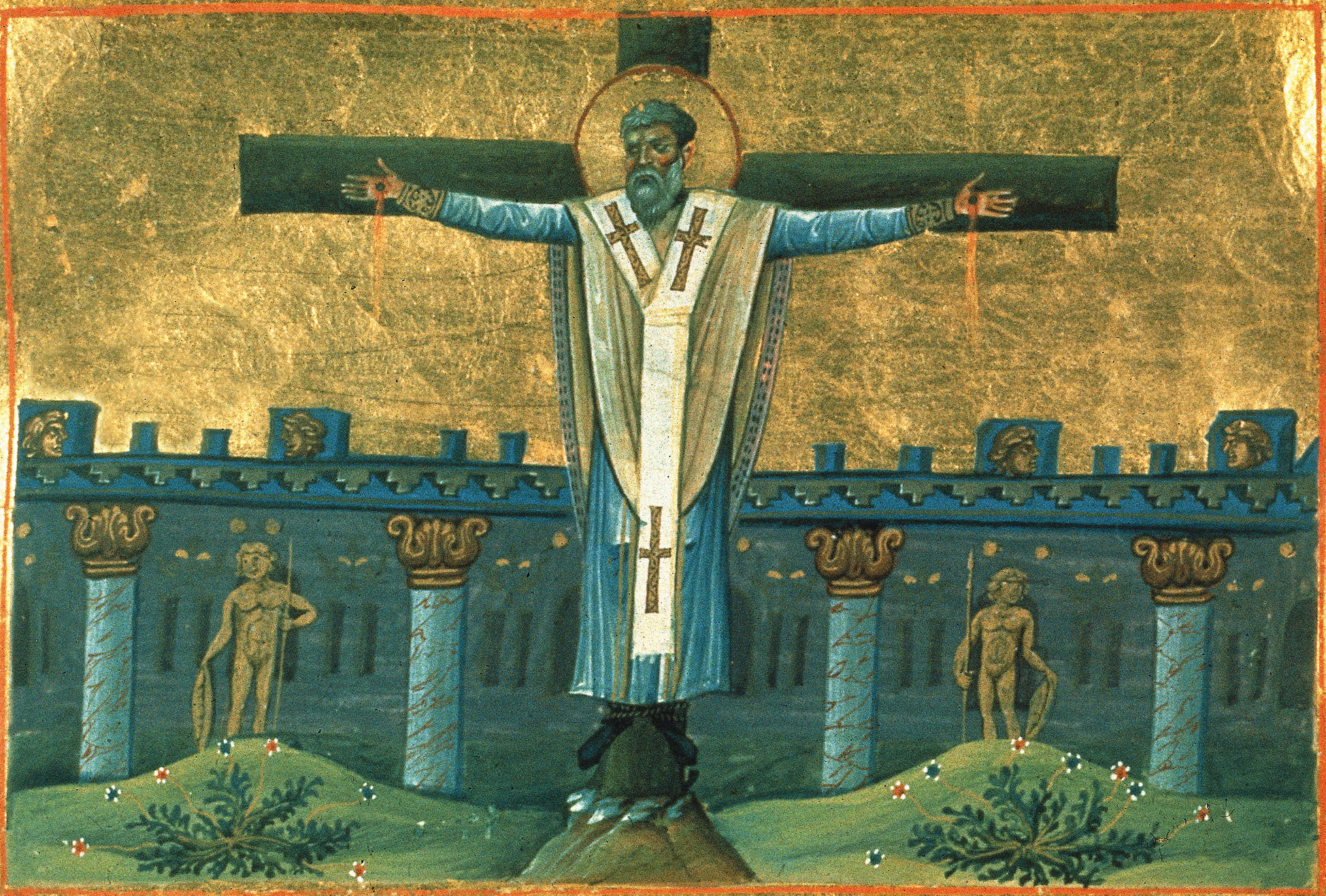
Martyrdom of St. Simeon (Menologion of Basil II, 10th century)

The 19th-century Anglican theologian J.B. Lightfoot identified three possible positions on the relationship to Jesus of those called his brothers and sisters by reference to their 4th-century advocates, namely the Helvidian (after Helvidius, who wrote c. 380), the Epiphanian (after Epiphanius of Salamis, 315-403), and the Hieronymian (after Jerome, 349-419/20).

A fourth possibility, not mentioned by Lightfoot, is that the adelphoi were in fact full-blooded brothers and sisters of Jesus.

=== Full blood-siblings of Jesus ===
This position rejects the virgin birth of Jesus and argues that his brothers and sisters were full-on siblings. Main proponents of this belief were the Ebionites, a 2nd century Jewish Christian sect who rejected both the incarnation and the divinity of Jesus.

=== Half-siblings of Jesus (Helvidian view) ===
The view of Helvidius was that the adelphoi were half-siblings of Jesus born to Mary and Joseph after the firstborn Jesus. This is the most common Protestant position.

The following hypothetical family tree is based on the book Jesus and His World written by John J Rousseau and Rami Arav:

Mary	Joseph	Clopas	another Mary
Jesus	James d. 62	Joses	Simon	sister	sister	Jude	Simeon successor to James as head of the Jerusalem Church d. 106
?
?
Bishop Judah Kyriakos fl. c. 148–49

=== Stepbrothers of Jesus (Epiphanian view) ===
The Epiphanian view, named after its main proponent, the fourth-century bishop Epiphanius, and championed by the third century theologian Origen and fourth-century bishop Eusebius, the “brothers” and “sisters” mentioned in the New Testament are sons of Joseph from a previous marriage, and hence stepbrothers of Jesus. This is still the official position of the Eastern Orthodox Church.

Mary	Joseph	earlier wife
Jesus		James	Joses	Simon	Jude

=== Cousins of Jesus (Hieronymian view) ===
The Hieronymian view was put forward in the 4th century by Jerome, who argued that not only Mary, but Joseph too, had been a life-long virgin. Apparently voicing the general opinion of the church, he held that the "brothers of Jesus" were the sons of Mary the "mother of James and Joses" mentioned in Mark 15:40, whom he identified with the wife of Clopas and sister of Mary, the mother of Jesus mentioned in John 19:25. The Catholic Church continues to teach that the adelphoi were cousins of Jesus.

The following family tree is from Richard Bauckham, "Jude and the Relatives of James":

Anne	Joachim
Joseph	Mary	another Mary	Clopas
Jesus	James the Less	Joses	Simon	Jude

Jerome's argument produces the unlikely result of two sisters both named Mary. A modern variant eliminates this by identifying Clopas as the brother of Joseph, thereby making the two Marys sisters-in-law; in this version Jesus's cousin Simon is identified with Symeon the second leader of the church in Jerusalem.

The following family tree is from Richard Bauckham, "Jude and the Relatives of James":

Jacob
Mary	Joseph	Clopas	another Mary
Jesus	James the Less	Joses	Simon	Jude

== Development of the tradition ==
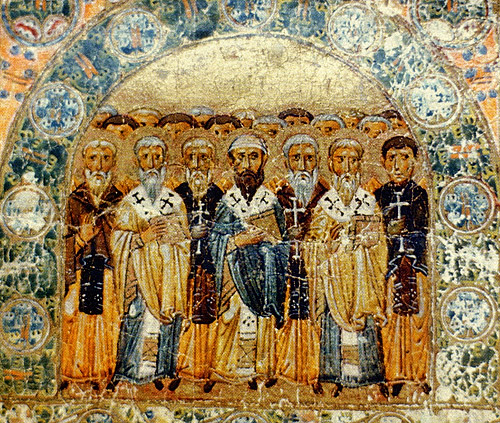
The Church Fathers in an 11th-century depiction from Kiev

From the 2nd century onward the developing emphasis on ascetism and celibacy as the superior form of Christian practice, together with an emphasis on the chastity of Mary, led to the idea that she had been a virgin not only before, but during and after, the birth of Christ. There is no direct biblical basis for this idea, which in its earliest assertion appears in the mid-2nd century Protoevangelium of James; this depicts Mary as a lifelong virgin, Joseph as an old man who marries her without physical desire, and the brothers of Jesus as Joseph's sons by an earlier marriage. Though, Richard Bauckham argues that "It is possible that the brothers of Jesus were correctly remembered not to have been sons of Mary and that this made possible the development of the idea of Mary's perpetual virginity as a result. Good historical tradition certainly was still available in the early second century, even if mixed with much legendary material."

By the 3rd century, the doctrine of the perpetual virginity of Mary had become well established, but the unequivocal scriptural references to the brethren of Jesus raised obvious problems. The heretical antidicomarianites ("opponents of Mary") maintained that, when Joseph became Mary's husband, he was a widower with six children, and he had normal marital relations with Mary, but they later held Jesus was not born of these relations. Bonosus was a bishop who in the late 4th century held Mary had other children after Jesus, for which the other bishops of his province condemned him. Important orthodox theologians such as Hippolytus (170–235), Eusebius (260/265–339/340) and Epiphanius (c. 310/320–403) defended the perpetual virginity of Mary. Eusebius and Epiphanius held the adelphoi were Joseph's children from a previous marriage. Epiphanius adds Joseph became the father of James and his three brothers (Joses, Simeon, Judah) and two sisters (a Salome and a Mary or a Salome and an Anna) with James being the elder sibling. James and his siblings were not children of Mary but were Joseph's children from a previous marriage. Joseph's first wife died; many years later, at the age of eighty, "he took Mary (mother of Jesus)". According to Epiphanius the Scriptures call them "brothers of the Lord" to confound their opponents. Origen (184–254) also wrote "according to the Gospel of Peter the brethren of Jesus were sons of Joseph by a former wife, whom he married before Mary".

The History of Joseph the Carpenter, probably written in Egypt in the 5th century and heavily indebted to the Protoevangelium of James, depicts Joseph as an old widower with children from a previous marriage, thus clarifying the New Testament references to Jesus's brothers.

According to the surviving fragments of the work Exposition of the Sayings of the Lord of the Apostolic Father Papias of Hierapolis, who lived circa 70–163 AD, "Mary the wife of Cleophas or Alphaeus" would be the mother of James the Just, Simon, Judas (identified as Jude the Apostle), and Joseph (Joses). Papias identifies this "Mary" as the sister of Mary, mother of Jesus, and thus as the maternal aunt of Jesus. The Anglican theologian J.B. Lightfoot dismissed Papias' evidence as spurious.

The Gospel of Pseudo-Matthew, which was probably written in the seventh century, states the brothers of Jesus were his cousins.

Both the Eastern and Western traditional churches maintain that Mary was a perpetual virgin; early Protestant leaders, including the Reformer Martin Luther, and Reformed theologian Huldrych Zwingli, also held this view, as did John Wesley, one of the founders of Methodism. Eine Christliche Lehrtafel (A Christian Catechism), issued by Anabaptist leader Balthasar Hubmaier, teaches the perpetual virginity of the Virgin Mary, too. The Catholic Church, following Jerome, conclude that the adelphoi were Jesus's cousins, while the Eastern Orthodox Church, following Eusebius and Epiphanius, argue they were Joseph's children from a previous marriage. Lutherans have accepted both views as being valid explanations of the doctrine of the perpetual virginity of Mary.

Other Christian denominations view the adelphoi as Jesus's half-brothers or do not specify, since the accounts in the Gospels do not speak of Mary's relationship to them but only to Jesus.

== Absence of Jesus's brothers ==
There are some events in scripture where siblings of Jesus are not shown, e.g., when Jesus was lost in the Temple and during his crucifixion. Luke 2:41–51 reports the visit of Mary, Joseph, and Jesus to the Temple in Jerusalem when Jesus was 12 years old but does not mention any siblings. Robert Eisenman is of the belief Luke sought to minimise the importance of Jesus's family by whatever means possible, editing James and Jesus's brothers out of the Gospel record. The Catholic apologist Karl Keating argues Mary and Joseph rushed without hesitation straight back to Jerusalem when they realized Jesus was lost, which they would surely have thought twice about doing if there were other children (Jesus's blood siblings) to look after.

The Gospel of John records the sayings of Jesus on the cross, i.e., the pair of commands "Woman, behold your son!" and "Behold, thy mother!" (John 19:26–27), then states "from that hour the disciple took her unto his own home". Since the era of the Church Fathers this statement has been used to reason that after the death of Jesus there were no other biological children to look after Mary, and she had to be entrusted to the disciple. Constantine Zalalas argues it would have been against Jewish custom for Jesus to give his mother to the care of the disciple if Mary had other living sons, because the eldest son would always take responsibility for his mother. Karl Keating says, "It is hard to imagine why Jesus would have disregarded family ties and made this provision for his Mother if these four [James, Joseph/Joses, Simon, Jude] were also her sons". Pope John Paul II also says the command "Behold your son!" was the entrustment of the disciple to Mary in order to fill the maternal gap left by the death of her only son on the cross. According to John of Shanghai and San Francisco Joseph’s sons regarded Mary as a stepmother and therefore showed her less care and affection than John, her adopted son. Vincent Taylor points out difficulties in these interpretations of the text: it ignores both the fact that Jesus's brothers opposed his claims, and the position of honour of John, the beloved disciple.

== Descendants of Jesus's family ==
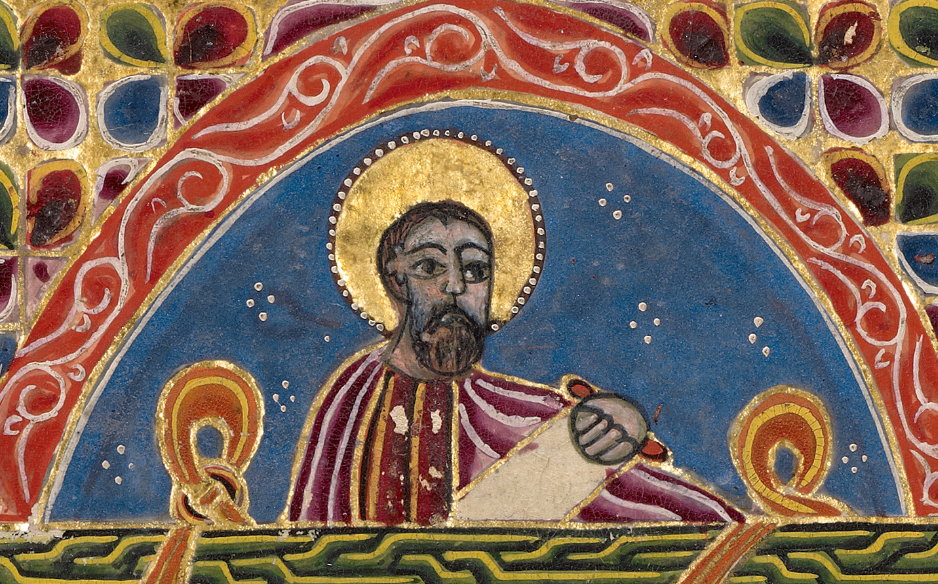
Eusebius of Caesarea, medieval Armenian manuscript from Isfahan, Persia

The early Christian historian Sextus Julius Africanus (died c. 240), in his "Genealogy of the Holy Gospels", referred to "relatives of our Lord according to the flesh" whom he called desposyni , meaning "from the Lord's family". Of these individuals, only the 2nd century Bishop of Jerusalem Judah Kyriakos is historically attested by name.

== See also ==
- Gospel of James
- James Ossuary
