= Women at the crucifixion =

Presence of female disciples

The presence of a group of female disciples of Jesus at the crucifixion of Jesus is found in all four Gospels of the New Testament. There have been different interpretations of how many and which women were present. Although some Christian traditions hold that there were Three Marys at the cross, only one gospel claims this, and these names differ from the other gospels.

== Narrative comparison ==
	Matthew	Mark	Luke	John
Women at the cross	Matthew 27:55–56 many women ... who had followed Jesus from Galilee, ministering to him, among whom were Mary Magdalene and Mary the mother of James and Joseph and the mother of the sons of Zebedee	Mark 15:40 women ... among whom were Mary Magdalene, and Mary the mother of James the younger and of Joses, and Salome	Luke 23:49 the women who had followed him from Galilee	John 19:25 his mother and his mother's sister, Mary the wife of Clopas, and Mary Magdalene
Women at the burial	Matthew 27:61; Mary Magdalene and the other Mary were there, sitting opposite the tomb	Mark 15:47; Mary Magdalene and Mary of Joses saw where he was laid	Luke 23:55 the women who had come with him from Galilee	
Women visiting the tomb	Matthew 28:1; Mary Magdalene and the other Mary	Mark 16:1; Mary Magdalene and Mary the mother of James and Salome	Luke 24:10; Mary Magdalene and Joanna and Mary the mother of James and the other women with them	John 20:1; Mary Magdalene

== Interpretations ==
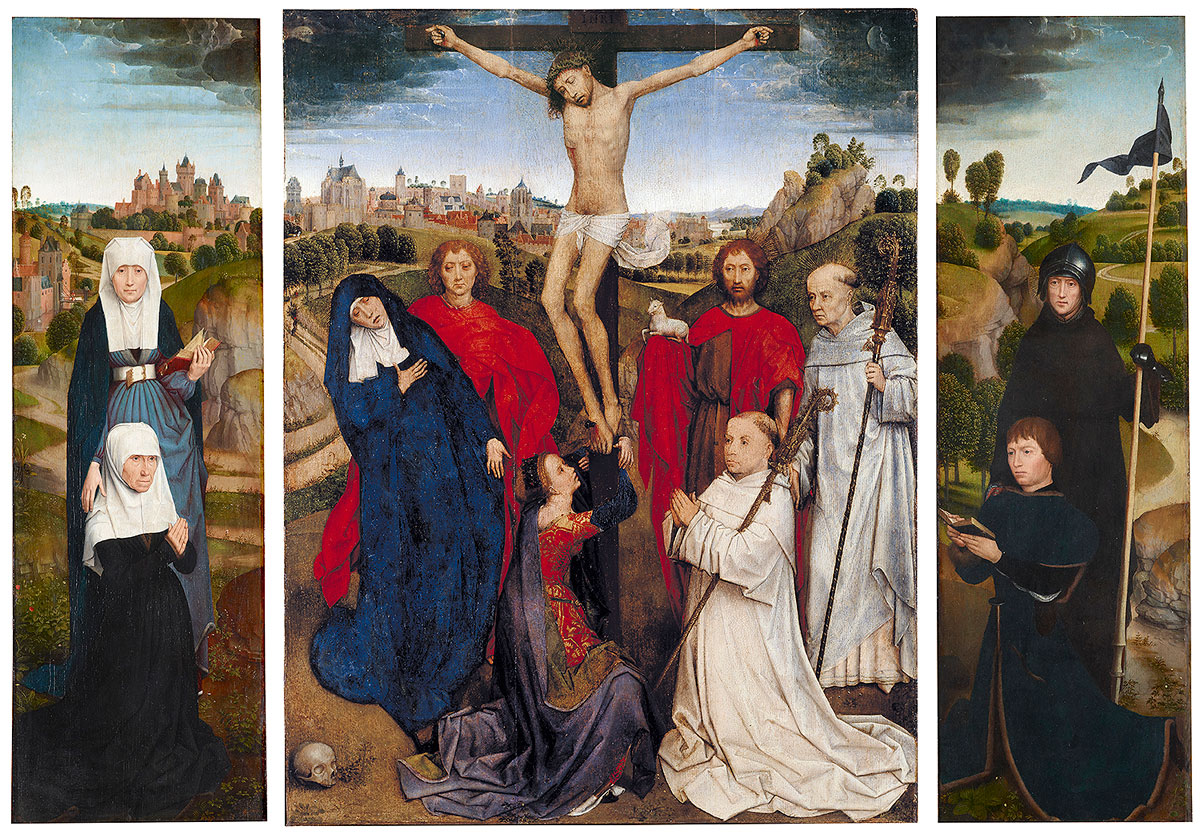
Hans Memling (c. 1468) - group at the foot of the cross

Matthew and Mark, who speak of "many women" present at the crucifixion, mention three individually at the death of Jesus and two at his burial. Matthew describes the third individual present at the death as the mother of the sons of Zebedee, without naming her. Mark's third individual is called Salome. Luke mentions none individually. John mentions four individually, including "the mother of Jesus," who is not mentioned by the other gospels. Mark, Matthew, and Luke all place the women "at a distance" (the disciples having fled), whereas John has them "standing by the cross" (19:24).

The indication in John 19:25 could be interpreted as referring to two, three or four women. There are difficulties against taking it as presenting a double apposition, with "his mother" being Mary of Clopas, and "his mother's sister" being Mary Magdalene. If the women are three, then there is a single apposition, with Mary of Clopas presented as the sister of Jesus' mother (despite the awkwardness of having two sisters bearing the same name) or else, since Hebrew and Aramaic had no specific word for "cousin", presented as her cousin or her sister-in-law, with Clopas considered the brother of Joseph. If there is no apposition, the women are four, as understood by Tatian and the Peshitta. If the last interpretation is chosen, the accounts that the four gospels give of individual women present at the crucifixion are:

Person	Matthew	Mark	Luke	John
Mary, mother of Jesus				Y
Mary Magdalene	Y	Y		Y
Mary, mother of James and Joseph/Joses	Y	Y		
The mother of the sons of Zebedee	Y			
Salome		Y		
A sister of Mary, mother of Jesus				Y
Mary of Clopas				Y

Mary Magdalene is mentioned by all gospels apart from Luke, who mentions no individual. Mary, mother of James and Joseph/Joses is mentioned by Matthew and Mark. The others are mentioned by one gospel only: Mary, the mother of Jesus; Mary, the mother of the sons of Zebedee; Salome; a sister of Mary, mother of Jesus; Mary of Clopas.

Attempts have been made to consider Mary of Clopas, the mother of James and Joseph/Joses, and a half-sister or sister-in-law of Mary the mother of Jesus as different descriptions of the same person.

== See also ==
- New Testament people named Mary
- The Three Marys
