= Adversus Helvidium =

4th-century apologetic work by St. Jerome

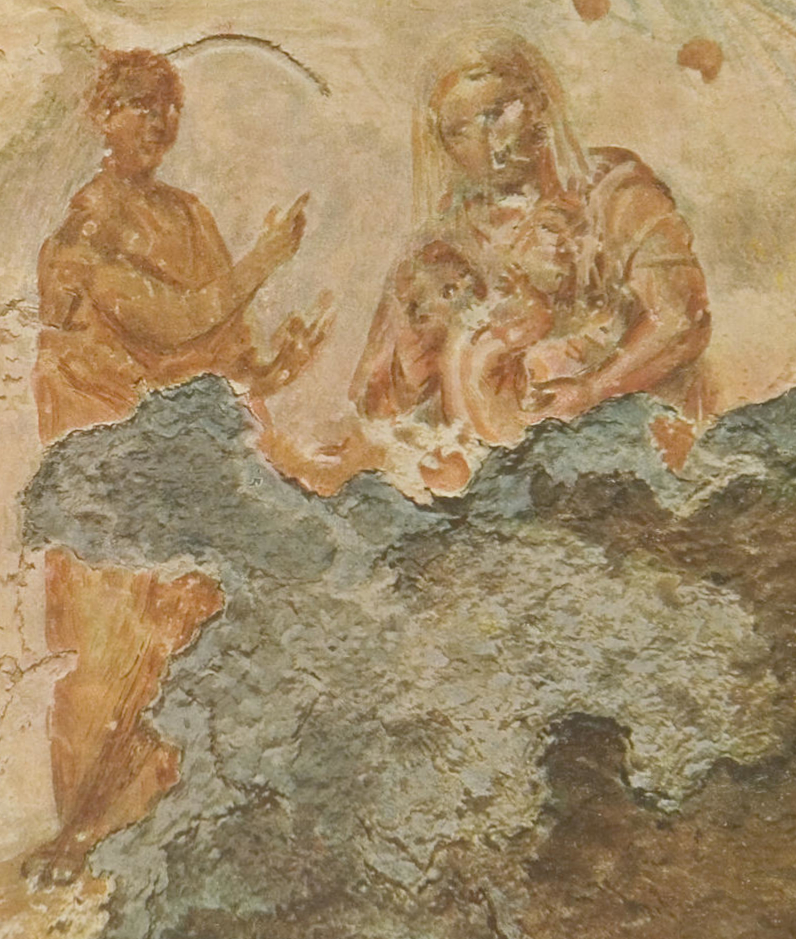
Isaiah (left) predicts the birth of the Messiah from the Virgin. Possibly the oldest known image of Mary, mother of Jesus shown nursing the Infant Jesus. Circa AD 100–150, Catacomb of Priscilla, Rome.

On the Perpetual Virginity of Blessed Mary Against Helvidius (Latin: De perpetua virginitate beatae Mariae adversus Helvidium) is an apologetic work of Saint Jerome which refutes Helvidius' stance on Mary's virginity. (c. AD 342/7–420).

Helvidius took the view that although Mary was a virgin at the time she conceived Jesus, she and Joseph had sexual relations subsequently—hence the brothers and sisters of Jesus mentioned in the Gospels. Jerome, in contrast, argued vigorously for the perpetual virginity of Mary, whom he deemed exemplary for women making (or contemplating) vows of virginity. Jerome argued that the "brothers" of Jesus were actually cousins, according to how the word translated "brother" was used at the time. Joseph himself, Jerome argued, lived a celibate life to serve as a model for Christian men. Joseph was Mary's guardian, not her husband; the relation was not a marriage, which for Jerome implied sex.

Saint Jerome maintains against Helvidius three propositions:

- That Joseph was only putatively, not really, the husband of Mary.
- That the "brothers" of the Lord were his cousins, not his own brothers.
- That virginity is better than the married state.

== See also ==
- Brothers of Jesus
