= Simeon of Jerusalem =

1st century Bishop of Jerusalem

Saint Simeon
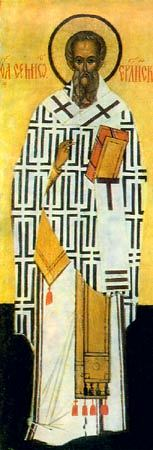

Bishop and Martyr
- Born: Galilee, Judaea Province
- Died: c. 107 AD; Jerusalem, Judaea Province
- Venerated in: Roman Catholic Church; Eastern Orthodox Church; Lutheran Church
- Canonized: Pre-Congregation
- Feast: February 18 (Western Christianity); April 27 (Eastern Christianity)

Simeon of Jerusalem, or Simon of Clopas (Hebrew: שמעון הקלפוס), was a Jewish Christian leader and according to most Christian traditions the second Bishop of Jerusalem (63 or 70–107), succeeding James, brother of Jesus. Simeon is sometimes identified with Simon, brother of Jesus, and has also been identified with the Apostle Simon the Zealot.

== Life ==
In his Church History Eusebius of Caesarea gives the list of these bishops. According to tradition the first bishop of Jerusalem was James the Just, the "brother of the Lord", who according to Eusebius said that he was appointed bishop by the apostles Peter, James (whom Eusebius identifies with James, son of Zebedee), and John.

According to Eusebius, Simeon of Jerusalem was selected as James' successor after the conquest of Jerusalem which took place immediately after the martyrdom of James (i.e. no later than 70 AD) which puts the account in agreement with that of Flavius Josephus, who puts James' first arrest and subsequent release by Procurator Lucceius Albinus in 63 AD and the modern footnotes show that his martyrdom took place some years afterwards, shortly before the destruction of Jerusalem.

After the martyrdom of James and the conquest of Jerusalem which immediately followed, it is said that those of the apostles and disciples of the Lord that were still living came together from all directions with those that were related to the Lord according to the flesh (for the majority of them also were still alive) to take counsel as to who was worthy to succeed James. They all with one consent pronounced Symeon, the son of Clopas, of whom the Gospel also makes mention; to be worthy of the episcopal throne of that parish. He was a cousin, as they say, of the Saviour. For Hegesippus records that Clopas was a brother of Joseph.

According to Hegesippus, Simeon prevailed against Thebutis, whom the church fathers deemed a heresiarch, and led most of the Christians to Pella before the outbreak of the First Jewish–Roman War in 66 and the destruction of Herod's Temple in 70.

According to Eusebius, Simeon was executed about the year 107 under the reign of emperor Trajan by the proconsul Tiberius Claudius Atticus Herodes in Jerusalem or the vicinity. However, this must be a mistake by Eusebius because the administrator (Legate) of the Roman province of Judea at the time of the crucifixion was Quintus Pompeius Falco (between 105 and 107 AD) and Tiberius Claudius Atticus Herodes was there much earlier, from 99 to 102 AD.

== Identifications ==
Simeon is sometimes identified with Simon, the "brother of the Lord", who is mentioned in passing in the Bible (Matthew 13:55, Mark 6:3) and pointing to Hegesippus referring to him as the second bishop of Jerusalem and as a cousin of Jesus. Other exegetes consider the brothers to be actual brothers and Hegesippus' wording as subsuming both James and Simeon under a more general term.

He has also been identified with the Apostle Simon the Zealot.

== See also ==
- Saint Simeon of Jerusalem, patron saint archive
