= Simon, brother of Jesus =

Figure in the New Testament

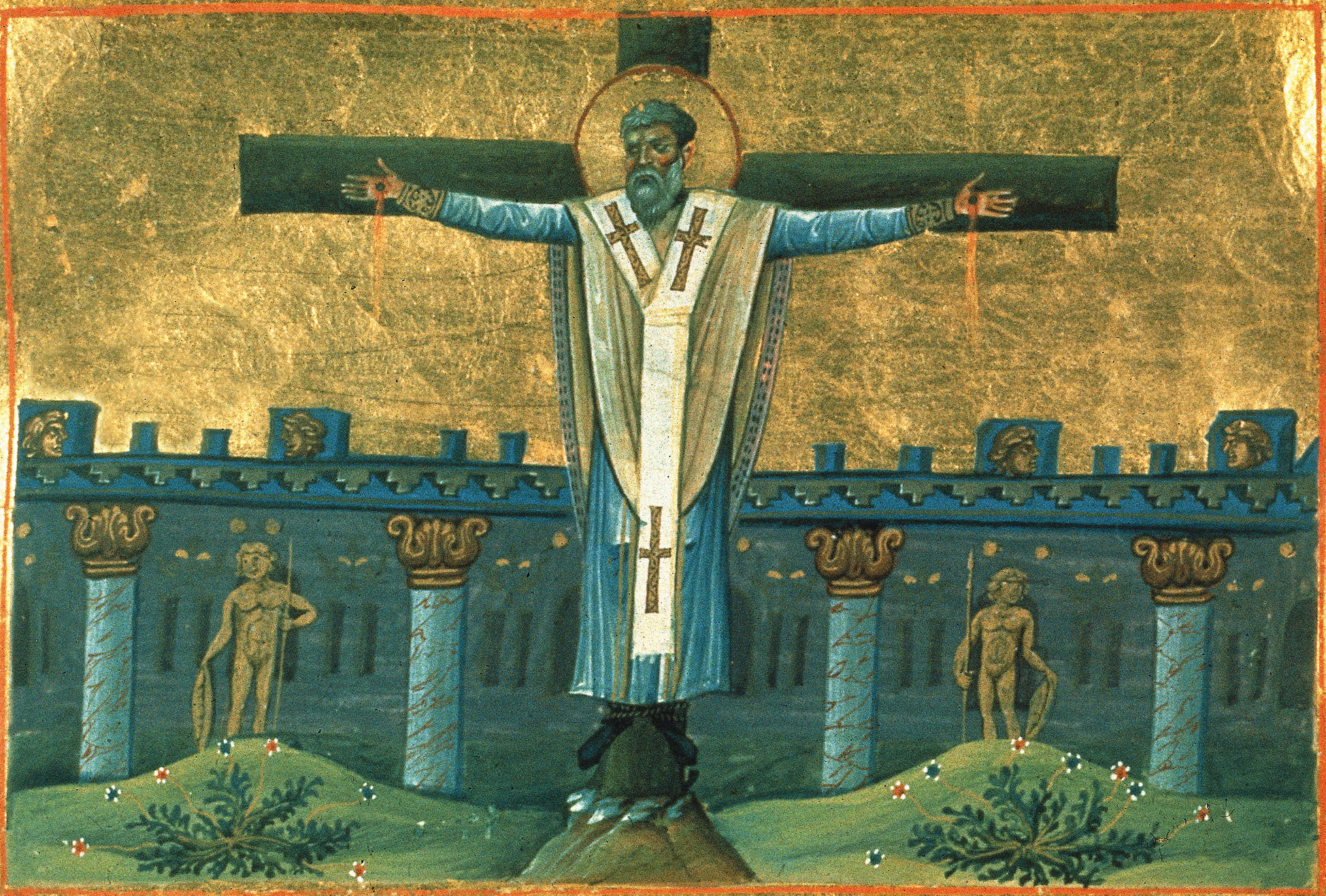
Martyrdom of St. Simeon (Menologion of Basil II, 10th century)

Simon (Ancient Greek: Σίμων) is described in the New Testament as one of the "brothers" of Jesus (Greek: ἀδελφοί, romanized: ádelphoi, lit. 'brothers').

== New Testament ==
In Matthew 13:55, people ask concerning Jesus, "Is not this the carpenter's son? is not his mother called Mary? and his brethren, James, and Joses, and Simon, and Judas?" while in Mark 6:3 they ask, "Is not this the carpenter, the son of Mary, the brother of James, and Joses, and of Juda, and Simon? and are not his sisters here with us?"

The Catholic Church defined that "brothers of Jesus" are not biological children of Mary, because of the dogma of the perpetual virginity of Mary, by virtue of which it rejects the idea that Simon and any other than Jesus Christ could be a biological son of Mary, suggesting that the so-called Desposyni were either sons of Joseph from a previous marriage (in other words, step-brothers) or else were cousins of Jesus. The Catholic Encyclopedia suggests that Simon may be the same person as Simeon of Jerusalem or Simon the Zealot. Some Protestant interpreters who deny the perpetual virginity of Mary usually take Simon to have been a half-brother of Jesus.

According to the surviving fragments of the work Exposition of the Sayings of the Lord of the Apostolic Father Papias of Hierapolis, who lived c. 70–163 AD, Mary the wife of Cleophas or Alphaeus would be the mother of Simon, the brother of Jesus:

Mary the wife of Cleophas or Alphaeus, who was the mother of James the bishop and apostle, and of Simon and Thaddeus, and of one Joseph... (Fragment X)

James Tabor, in his controversial book The Jesus Dynasty, suggests that Simon was the son of Mary and Clophas. Robert Eisenman suggests that he was Simon Cephas (Simon the Rock), known in Greek as Peter (from petros "rock"), who led the Jewish Christian community after the death of James in 62 CE.

== Sources ==
- Shoemaker, Stephen J. (2016). Mary in Early Christian Faith and Devotion. Yale University Press. ISBN 978-0-300-21953-1.
