= Clopas =

Biblical figure

Clopas (Ancient Greek: Κλωπᾶς, Klōpas; Hebrew: possibly חלפי, Ḥalfi; Aramaic: חילפאי, Ḥilfài) is a figure of early Christianity. The name appears in the New Testament, specifically in John 19:25:

Near the cross of Jesus stood his mother, his mother's sister, Mary the wife of Clopas, and Mary Magdalene.

He is often identified with another figure of a similar name, Cleophas (Κλεοπᾶς), one of the two disciples who met Christ during the road to Emmaus appearance (Luke 24:13–27).

Luke 24:18

Then one of them, named Cleopas, answered him, “Are you the only visitor to Jerusalem...

There is some variation of the Greek manuscripts of both John 19:25 and Luke 24 as to the spelling Κλ[ε]οπᾶς, and the John "Clopas" is rendered "Cleophas" in the KJV.

== Parallel passages ==
The identity of the other women in the parallel passages in Matthew 27:56 and Mark 15:40 is given as Mary Magdalene, "Mary the mother of James and Joses," and "Salome the mother of Zebedee's children" (Matthew), "Salome" (Mark). Luke does not mention the women watching near the cross. The parallels continue again with accounts of the burial. Matthew 28:1 has "Mary Magdalene and the other Mary" with no mention of John's mother Salome, Mark 16:1 has again Mary Magdalene, "Mary the mother of James" and Salome. Luke says "they," John mentions only Mary Magdalene.

As a result of these parallels commentators have identified "Mary of Clopas" with Mary mother of James, son of Alphaeus. Alphaeus (Greek Ἀλφαῖος) was also the name of the father of Matthew the Apostle (Mark 2:14). The Aramaic name Hilfai (חילפאי), or Hebrew name Halfi (חלפי) have been proposed by a variety of sources including Joseph Henry Thayer who argued in his Lexicon that dropping the Hebrew heth (ח ḥ, which has no corresponding letter in Greek) and rendering the Hebrew heth as kappa (Κ) in Greek were both possible. Perhaps under the influence of this tradition, Franz Delitzsch's modern Hebrew New Testament does in fact use the Hebrew name Yaakov ben Khalfi (יעקב בן חלפי) for James son of Alphaeus. The Aramaic name Halfai is evidenced on Aramaic panels of the period, and the name Hilphai in rabbinic literature.

== Interpretations ==
In the Gospel of Pseudo-Matthew, which was probably written in the seventh century, states that Mary of Cleophas was daughter of Cleophas and Anna:

Jesus met them, with Mary His mother, along with her sister Mary of Cleophas, whom the Lord God had given to her father Cleophas and her mother Anna, because they had offered Mary the mother of Jesus to the Lord. And she was called by the same name, Mary, for the consolation of her parents.

The most common interpretation is that "of Clopas" indicates the husband of this Mary and subsequently the father of her children, but some see "of Clopas" as meaning this Mary's father. In medieval tradition Clopas is the second husband of Saint Anne and the father of "Mary of Clopas".

Catholic and Eastern Orthodox traditions believed that Clopas is a brother of Saint Joseph, and that he is the same person with Cleopas.

== Early Christian writings ==
Clopas also appears in early Christian writings such as the 2nd century writers Papias and Hegesippus as a brother of Joseph, the husband of Mary, mother of Jesus, and as the father of Simeon, the second bishop of Jerusalem. Eusebius of Caesarea relates in his Church History (Book III, ch. 11), that after the destruction of Jerusalem in 70 AD, the Christians of Jerusalem:

all with one consent pronounced Symeon, the son of Clopas, of whom the Gospel also makes mention; to be worthy of the episcopal throne of that parish. He was a cousin, as they say, of the Saviour. For Hegesippus records that Clopas was a brother of Joseph.

== James Tabor ==
A few modern writers identify Mary of Clopas with Jesus' mother, such as James Tabor who has postulated that Clopas, whom he accepts as a brother of Joseph, became the second husband of Jesus' mother. Tabor argues that Clopas married Mary according to the Levirate law, which however would only apply in case of a childless widow - though this view is not widely accepted.
