= Hegesippus (chronicler) =

Second century Christian saint and chronicler

Saint Hegesippus
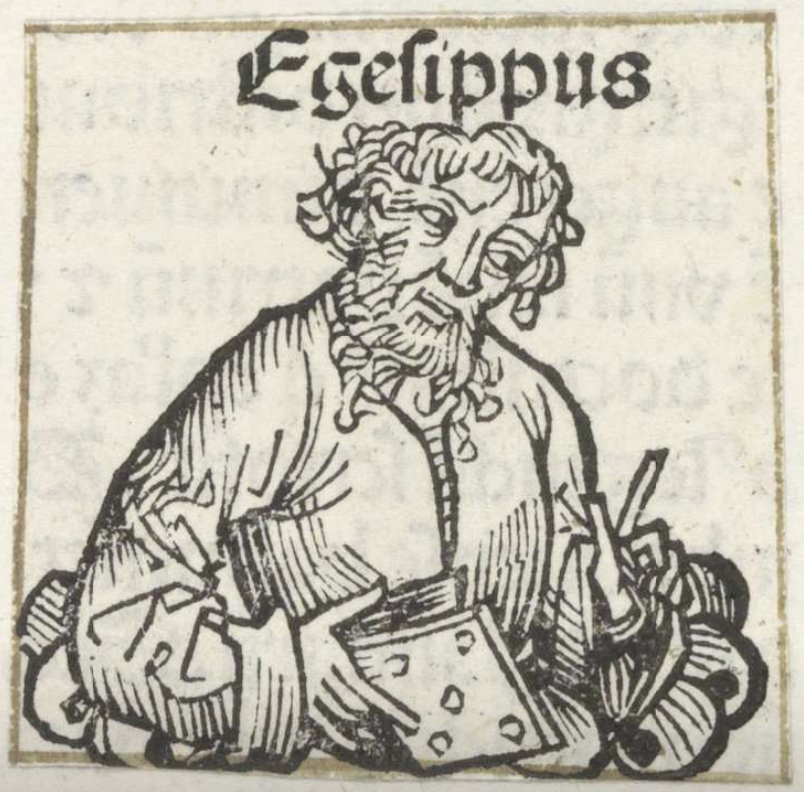
- Born: c. 107 AD
- Died: c. 180 AD; Jerusalem, Syria Palaestina
- Venerated in: Roman Catholic Church; Eastern Orthodox Church
- Feast: 7 April

Hegesippus (Ancient Greek: Ἡγήσιππος; c. 107 – c. 180 AD), also known as Hegesippus the Nazarene, was a Christian writer of the early Church who, in spite of his Greek name, may have been a Jewish convert and certainly wrote against heresies of the Gnostics and of Marcion.

== Biography ==
The dates that Hegesippus flourished are insecurely fixed by the statement of Eusebius that the death and apotheosis of Antinous (130) occurred in Hegesippus's lifetime, and that he came to Rome under Pope Anicetus (Bishop of Rome c. 157–168) and wrote in the time of Pope Eleuterus (pontificate c. 174–189).

Eusebius says that Hegesippus was a convert from Judaism, learned in the Semitic languages and conversant with the oral tradition and customs of the Jews, for he quoted from the Hebrew, was acquainted with the Gospel of the Hebrews and with a Syriac Gospel, and he also cited unwritten traditions of the Jews. Eusebius's own shaky command of Hebrew and Aramaic, and his lack of personal knowledge of customs of the Jews, were insufficiently founded to judge Hegesippus's credentials. He seems to have lived in some part of the East, for, in the time of Pope Anicetus (A.D. 155–166) he travelled through Corinth to reach Rome, collecting on the spot the teachings of the various churches which he visited, and ascertaining their uniformity with Rome, according to this excerpt:

"And the Church of the Corinthians remained in the true word until Primus was bishop in Corinth; I made their acquaintance in my journey to Rome, and remained with the Corinthians many days, in which we were refreshed with the true word. And when I was in Rome, I made a succession up to Anicetus, whose deacon was Eleuterus. And in each succession and in each city all is according to the ordinances of the law and the Prophets and the Lord"

== Works ==
Hegesippus's works are now entirely lost, save eight passages concerning Church history quoted by Eusebius, who tells us that he wrote Hypomnemata (Ὑπομνήματα; "Memoirs" or "Memoranda") in five books, in the simplest style concerning the tradition of the Apostolic preaching. Through Eusebius, Hegesippus was also known to Jerome, who is responsible for the idea that Hegesippus "wrote a history of all ecclesiastical events from the passion of our Lord down to his own period... in five volumes", which has established the Hypomnemata as a Church history. Hegesippus appealed principally to tradition as embodied in the teaching which had been handed down through the succession of bishops, thus providing for Eusebius information about the earliest bishops that otherwise would have been lost.

J.B. Lightfoot, in Clement of Rome (London, 1890), found traces of a list of popes in Epiphanius of Cyprus, (Haer., xxvii, 6) that may also derive from Hegesippus, where that fourth-century writer carelessly says: "Marcellina came to us lately and destroyed many, in the days of Anicetus, Bishop of Rome", and then refers to "the above catalogue", though he has given none. He is clearly quoting a writer who was at Rome in the time of Anicetus and made a list of popes A list which has some curious agreements with Epiphanius in that it extends only to Anicetus, is found in the poem of Pseudo-Tertullian against Marcion; apparently Epiphanius has mistaken Marcion for "Marcellina". The same list is at the base of the earlier part of the Liberian Catalogue, doubtless taken from Hippolytus. Correspondences among the lists of Irenaeus, Africanus, and Eusebius cannot be assumed to have come from the lost list of Hegesippus, as only Eusebius mentions his name.

Eusebius quotes from Hegesippus fifth and last book a long account of the death of James the Just, "the brother of the Lord", who was given the obscure Greek epithet Oblias, which is supposed to be a Greek transliteration of a Semitic word. Eusebius also transcribes Hegesippus's account of the election of his Simeon as bishop of Jerusalem, and of the summoning of the descendants of Jude the Apostle to Rome by the Emperor Domitian. A list of heresies against which Hegesippus wrote is also cited. Dr. Lawlor has argued that all these passages cited by Eusebius were connected in the original, and were in the fifth book of Hegesippus. He has also argued the likelihood that Eusebius got from Hegesippus the statement that John the Evangelist was exiled to Patmos by Domitian. Hegesippus mentioned the letter of Pope Clement I to the Corinthians, apparently in connection with the persecution of Domitian. It is very likely that the dating of heretics according to papal reigns in Irenaeus and Epiphanius—e.g., that Marcion's disciple Cerdon and Valentinus came to Rome under Anicetus—was derived from Hegesippus, and the same may be true of the assertion that Hermas, author of The Shepherd of Hermas, was the brother of Pope Pius I (as the Liberian Catalogue, the poem against Marcion, and the Muratorian fragment all state).

Theodor Zahn has shown that the work of Hegesippus may still have been extant in the sixteenth and seventeenth centuries in three Eastern libraries, saying: "We must lament the loss of other portions of the Memoirs which were known to exist in the seventeenth century."
