= The Holy Kinship (Geertgen tot Sint Jans) =

Painting by Geertgen tot Sint Jans

Holy Kinship
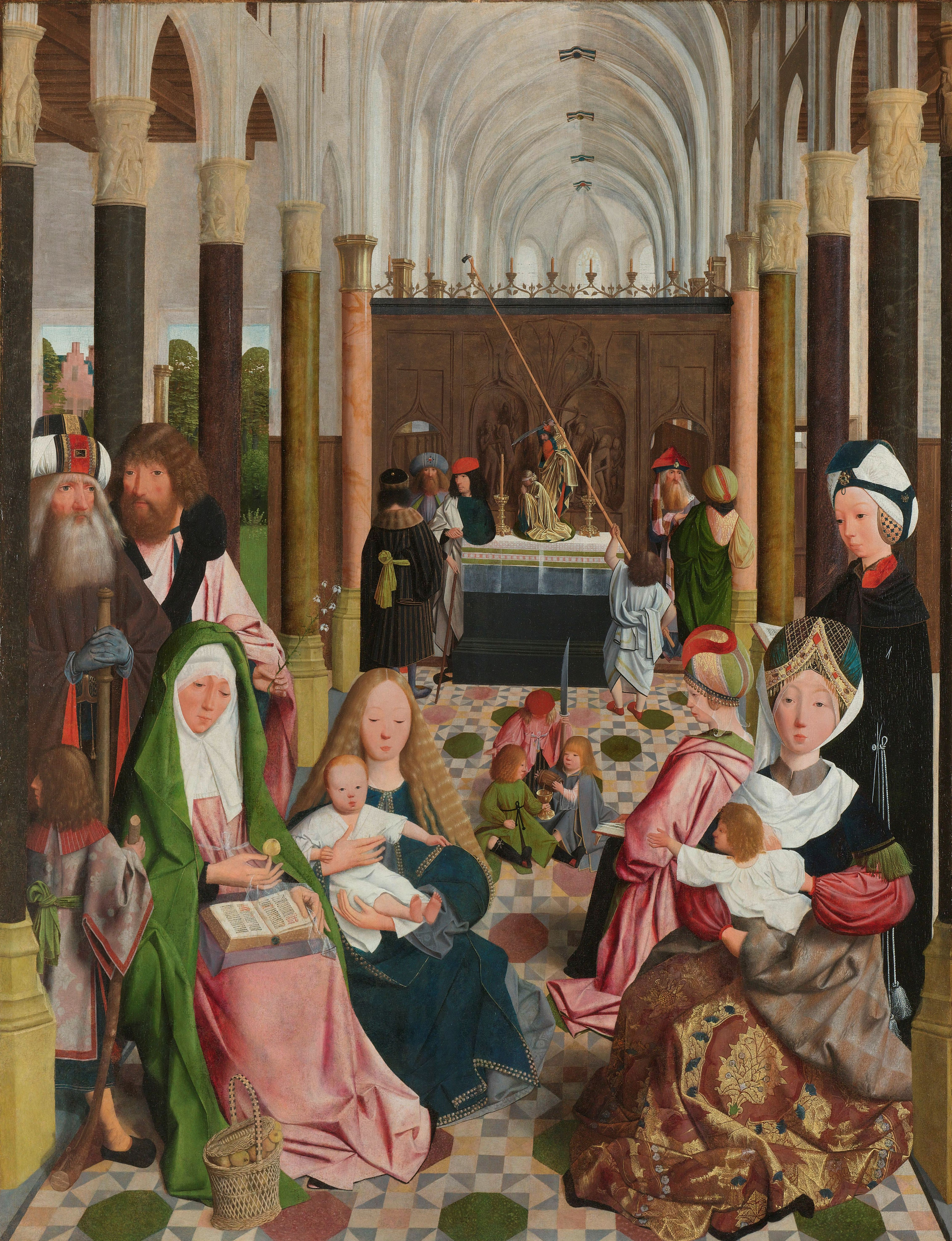
- Artist: workshop of Geertgen tot Sint Jans
- Year: circa 1495
- Medium: Oil on wood
- Dimensions: 100 cm × 70 cm (39 in × 28 in)
- Location: Rijksmuseum, Amsterdam

The Holy Kinship is a circa 1495 oil on panel painting of Holy Kinship by the workshop of the renaissance artist Geertgen tot Sint Jans in the collection of the Rijksmuseum.

== Painting ==
The Holy Kinship shows the Virgin and Child in the left center with Saint Elizabeth and John the Baptist slightly more prominently positioned center right. The "kinship" members have been further identified as Saint Anne with a book on the left with her husband Joachim behind her and behind him Saint Joseph holding a lily towards his wife. In the centre of the painting, three young cousins of the infants—the later disciples Simon and Zebedee's sons James and John—pour wine into a chalice, referring to the Eucharist, and beyond them a sculpture of Abraham's sacrifice of Isaac on the altar represents God's offering of His Son, Jesus, as sacrifice. A young Jude stands lighting the candles of the choir gate, while James, son of Alphaeus, identifiable by his traditional attribute of a fuller's club, is positioned near Sts. Anne and Joachim. Among the figures standing in the doorways of the choir gate are likely represented the other two former husbands of Saint Anne according to tradition, who are fathers to the other two Marias (Mary of Clopas, seen sitting in profile, and Mary Salome) positioned behind St. Elisabeth.

== Provenance ==
This painting is a former altarpiece of an unspecified church, though it is tempting to imagine similarities to the Commanderie van Sint-Jan where Geertgen is known to have lived and worked: Janskerk, Haarlem. The provenance of this painting only goes back to a Brussels sale in 1797 however, and indeed the painting was purchased in 1808 as a work by Jan and Hubert van Eyck. It wasn't until 1888 that it was identified as a work by the Haarlem master. Since then several attempts have been made to determine the origins of the painting. In his translated Schilder-boeck, Hessel Miedema reported that Geertgen died somewhere between 1486 and 1492, while recent dendrochronology, on the other hand, places the painting around 1496 at the earliest. The painting has many similar details in common with Albert van Ouwater's circa 1445 Lazarus and the tiled floor is similar to a contemporary painting by the Master of Alkmaar:

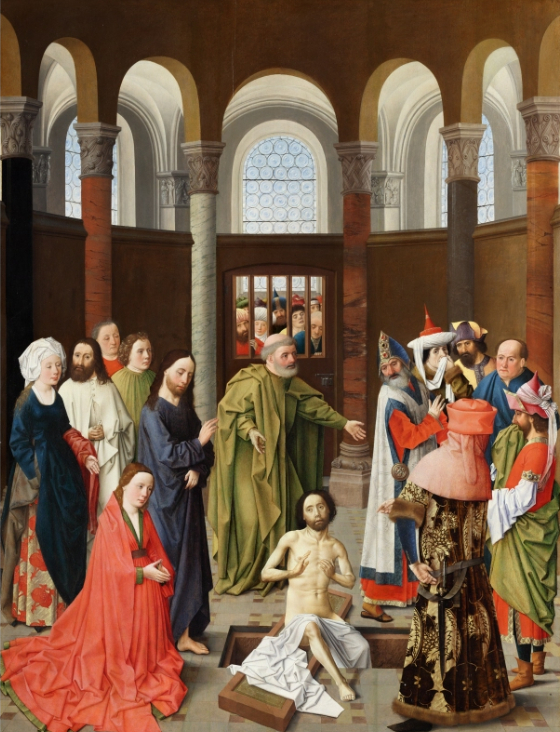
The c. 1445 tiled floor and columns are similar

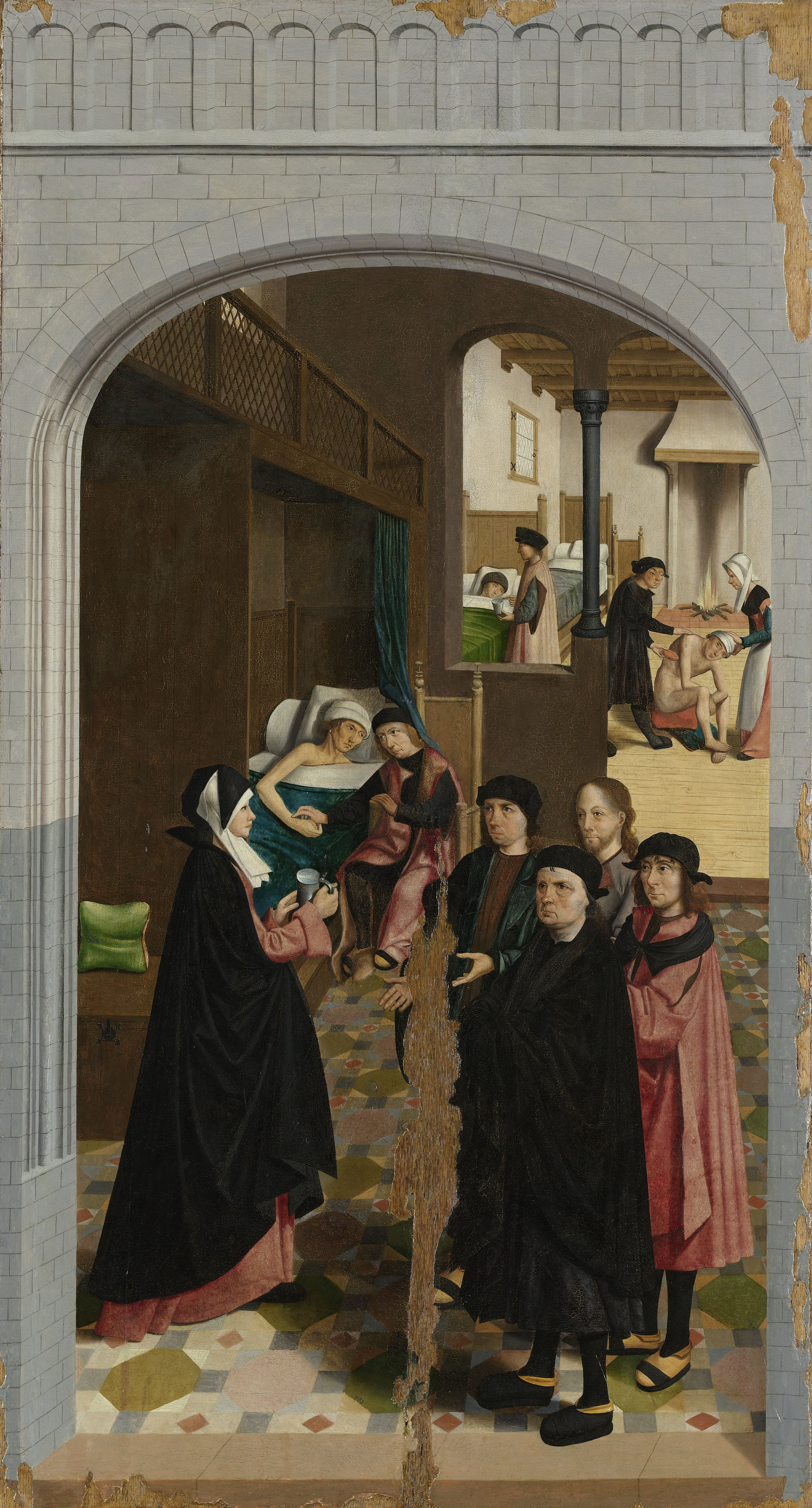
A similar tiled floor from c. 1504

== Exhibitions ==
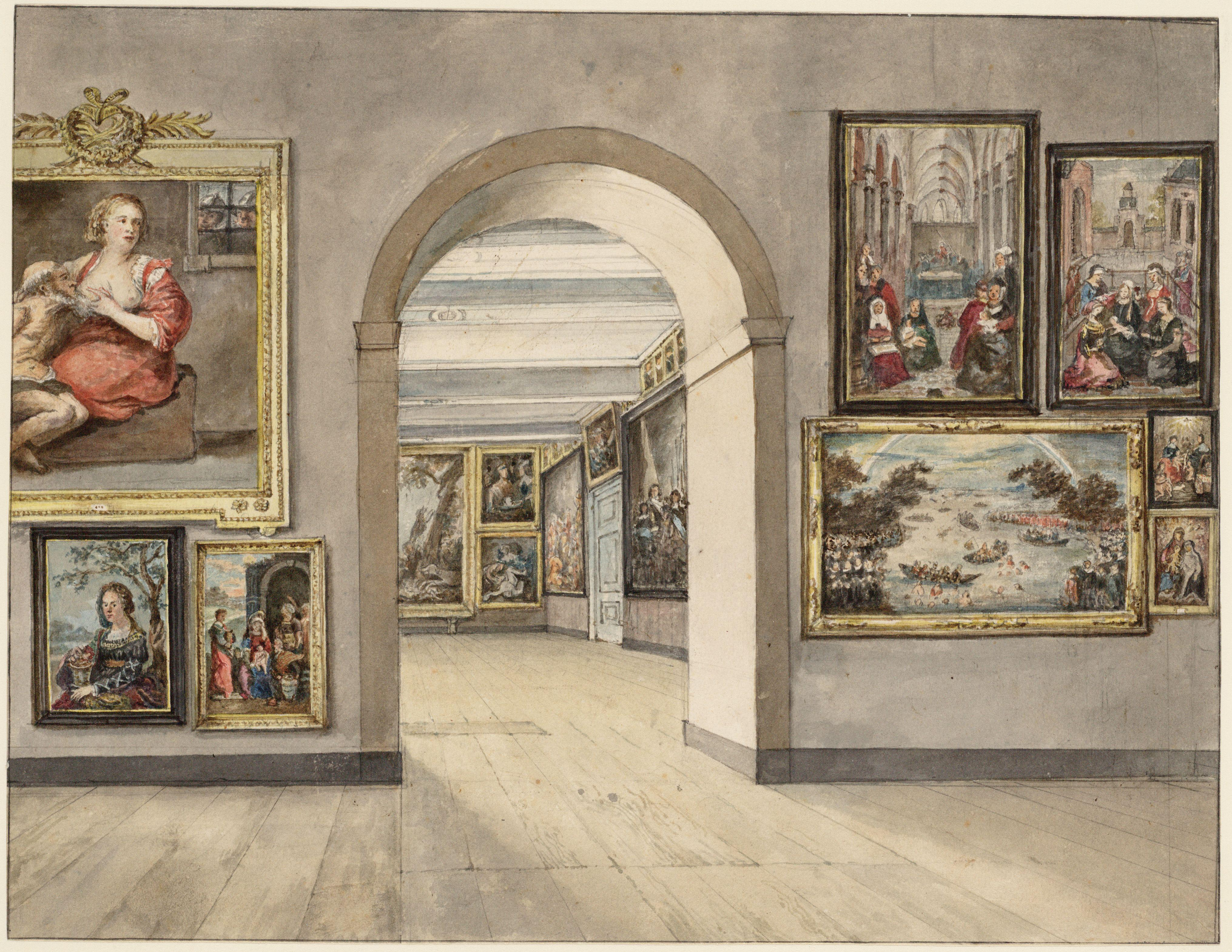
This painting can be seen hanging in a 19th-century sketch of the gallery of the Trippenhuis before the collection was moved to its present location in 1885

This painting has been considered a highlight of the collection since it was bought in 1808 and has been included in all Highlights of the Rijksmuseum catalogs. It was the subject of a mini-exhibition after 17 years were spent 1983-2000 restoring 12 centimeters of water damage at the bottom of the painting.
