= Saint Sarah =

Patron saint of the Romani ethnic group

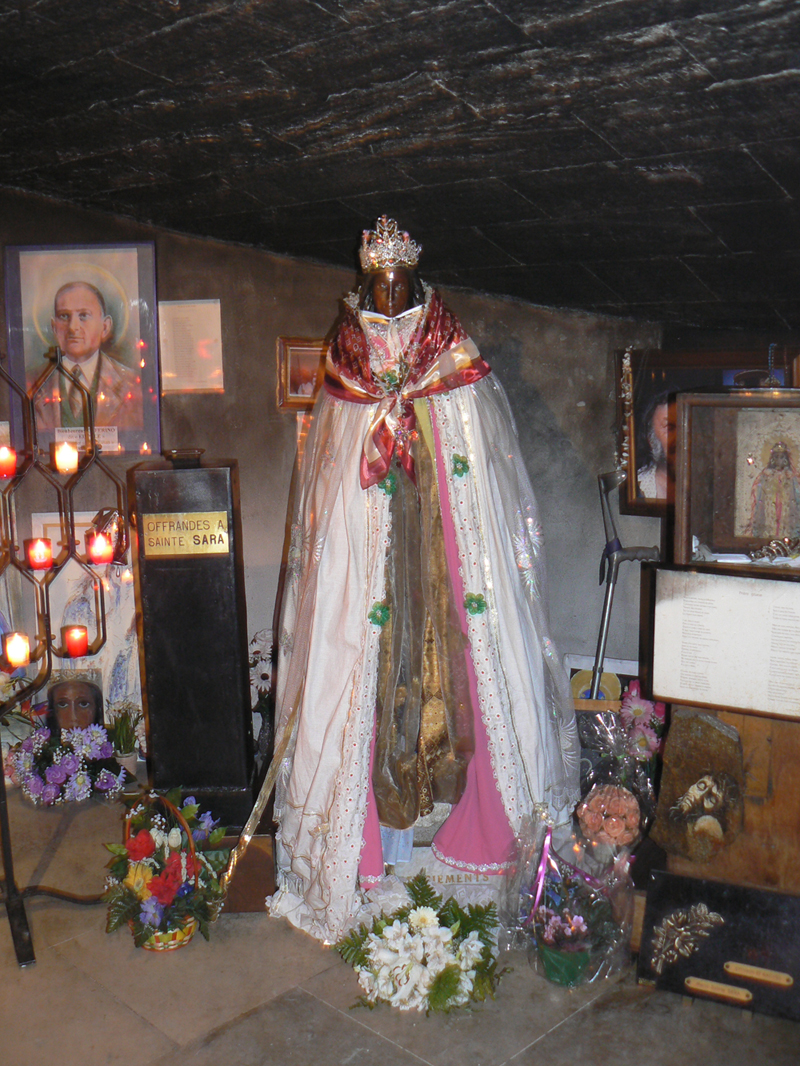
- The shrine of Saintes-Maries-de-la-Mer
- Born: Berenice Troglodytica
- Died: Unknown
- Venerated in: Folk Catholicism
- Major shrine: Church of the Saintes Maries de la Mer
- Feast: 24 May
- Patronage: Romani people

Saint Sarah, also known as Sara-la-Kâli ("Sara the Black"; Romani: Sara e Kali), is the patron saint of the Romani people in Folk Catholicism. The center of her veneration is Saintes-Maries-de-la-Mer, a place of pilgrimage for Roma in the Camargue, in Southern France. Legend identifies her as the servant of one of the Three Marys, with whom she is supposed to have arrived in the Camargue. Saint Sarah also shares her name with the Hindu goddess Kali who is a popular deity in northern India from where the Romani people originate. The name "Sara" itself is seen in the appellation of Durga as Kali in the famed text Durgasaptashati. Despite her popular veneration amongst Romani Catholics, she is not considered a Saint by the Roman Catholic Church.

== Accounts ==
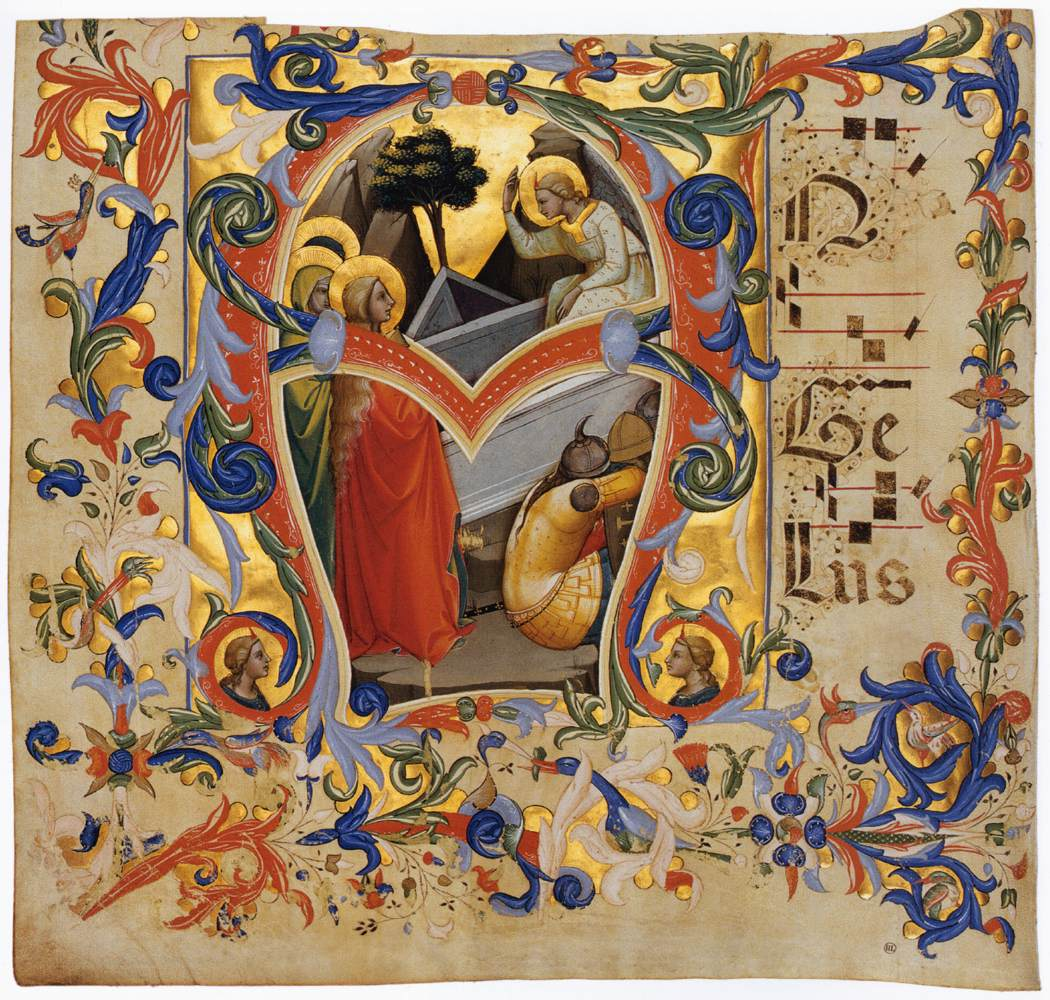
Lorenzo Monaco, The Three Marys at the Tomb

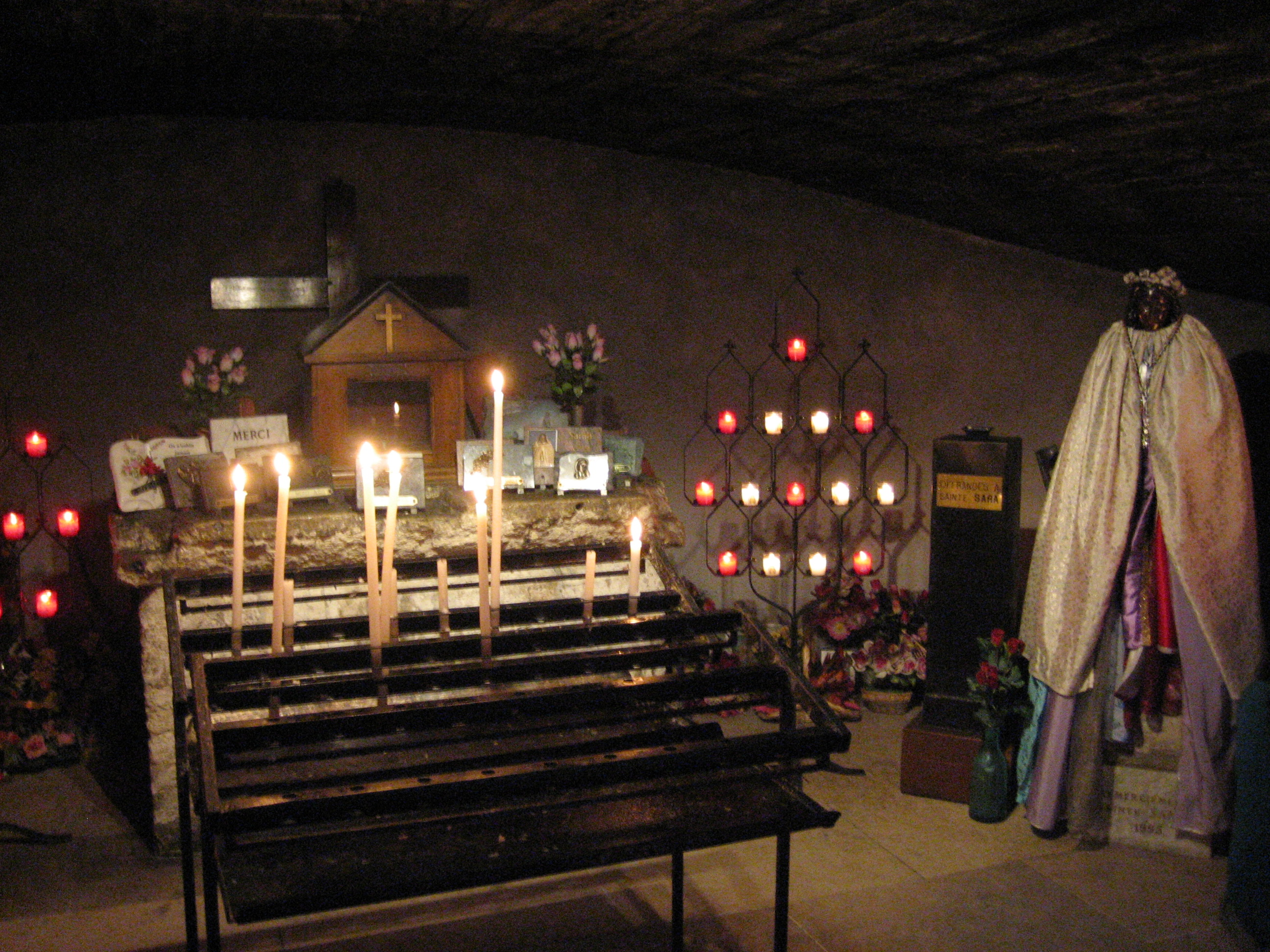
Interior of the Church of the Saintes Maries de la Mer

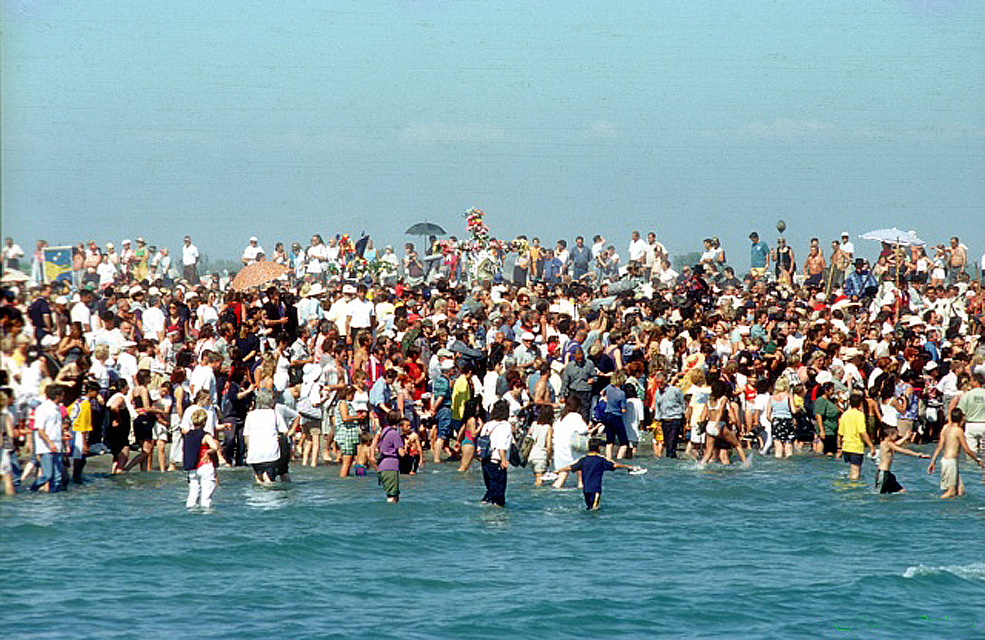
Ritual bath during the Romani pilgrimage of Saintes-Maries-de-la-Mer.

According to various legends, during a persecution of early Christians, commonly placed in the year 42, Lazarus, his sisters Mary and Martha, Mary Salome (the mother of the Apostles John and James), Mary Jacobe and Maximin were sent out to sea in a boat. They arrived safely on the southern shore of Gaul at the place later called Saintes-Maries-de-la-Mer. Sarah, a native of Berenice Troglodytica, appears as the black Indo-Egyptian maid of one of the Three Marys, usually Mary Jacobe. (The natives of Berenice Troglodytica had ancestors who once came from the Malabar Coast, through Indo-Roman trade relations, and settled in Egypt (Roman province) and intermarried with Egyptians.)

Though the tradition of the Three Marys arriving in France stems from the High Middle Ages, appearing for instance in the 13th century Golden Legend, Saint Sarah makes her first appearance in Vincent Philippon's book The Legend of the Saintes-Maries (1521), where she is portrayed as "a charitable woman that helped people by collecting alms, which led to the popular belief that she was a Gypsy." Subsequently, Sarah was adopted by Romani as their saint.

Another account has Sarah welcoming the Three Marys into Gaul. Franz de Ville (1956) writes:

One of our people who received the first Revelation was Sara the Kali. She was of noble birth and was chief of her tribe on the banks of the Rhône. She knew the secrets that had been transmitted to her... The Rom at that period practiced a polytheistic religion, and once a year they took out on their shoulders the statue of Ishtari (Astarte) and went into the sea to receive benediction there. One day Sara had visions which informed her that the Saints who had been present at the death of Jesus would come, and that she must help them. Sara saw them arrive in a boat. The sea was rough, and the boat threatened to founder. Mary Salome threw her cloak on the waves and, using it as a raft, Sarah floated towards the Saints and helped them reach land by praying.

== Pilgrimage ==
The day of the pilgrimage honouring Sarah is May 24; her statue is carried down to the sea on this day to re-enact her arrival in France.

Some authors have drawn parallels between the ceremonies of the pilgrimage and the worship of the Hindu goddess Kali (a form of Durga), subsequently identifying the two. Ronald Lee (2001) states:

If we compare the ceremonies with those performed in France at the shrine of Sainte Sara (called Sara e Kali in Romani), we become aware that the worship of Kali/Durga/Sara has been transferred to a Christian figure... in France, to a non-existent "sainte" called Sara, who is actually part of the Kali/Durga/Sara worship among certain groups in India.

The name "Sara" itself is seen in the appellation of Durga as Kali in the famed text Durgasaptashati.

== In popular culture ==
Some authors, taking up themes from the pseudohistorical book Holy Blood, Holy Grail, suggest that Sarah was the daughter of Jesus Christ and Mary Magdalene. These ideas were popularized by Dan Brown's The Da Vinci Code, Eron Manusov's Ahavah's Dream, and The Maeve Chronicles by Elizabeth Cunningham. These speculations have been rejected by the local inhabitants and by scholars.

- In The Rozabal Line, author Ashwin Sanghi puts forward that Sara-la-Kali refers to the three Hindu goddesses – Saraswati, Lakshmi, and Kali – the goddesses of Knowledge, Wealth and Power – symbolizing the trinity of female power.
- In Paulo Coelho's novel The Witch of Portobello, St. Sarah is mentioned several times.
- Alistair MacLean's 1970 thriller, Caravan to Vaccarès is set during the pilgrimage to Saintes-Maries-de-la-Mer.
- Czon the Swedish artist did a portrait of Sara La Kali outside the church in "Saintes Maries de la Mer" 2018.
- The statue of Saint Sarah makes an appearance in Tony Gatlif's 1993 film Latcho Drom (Safe Journey) where it is carried to the sea, and her landing is re-enacted.
- In Korkoro, also a Tony Gatlif film, the Romani often pray to Saint Sarah with intense fervor.
- The Chilean telenovela Romané also portrays the Romani's fervor for Sara Kali, set in Antofagasta Region, North of Chile.

== See also ==
- Three Marys

== Sources ==
- de Ville, Franz, Traditions of the Roma in Belgium, Brussels, 1956.
- Droit, Michel, Carmague. Ernest and Adair Heimann (trans.). London: George Allen and Unwin, 1963.
- Fonseca, Isabel, Bury Me Standing: The Gypsies and Their Journey. New York: Knopf, 1996.
- Kinsley, David R. Hindu Goddesses: Visions of the Divine Feminine in the Hindu Religious Tradition.' Berkeley: University of California Press, 1988.
- Lee, Ronald, "The Rom-Vlach Gypsies and the Kris-Romani", in: Walter Weyrauch (ed.), Gypsy Law: Romani Legal Traditions and Culture, Berkeley: University of California Press, 2001.
- McDowell, Bart, Gypsies: Wanderers of the World', Washington: National Geographic Society, 1970.
- Weyrauch, Walter, "Oral Legal Traditions of Gypsies", in: Walter Weyrauch (ed.), Gypsy Law: Romani Legal Traditions and Culture, Berkeley: University of California Press, 2001.
