= Salome (Gospel of James) =

Character in the apocryphal Gospel

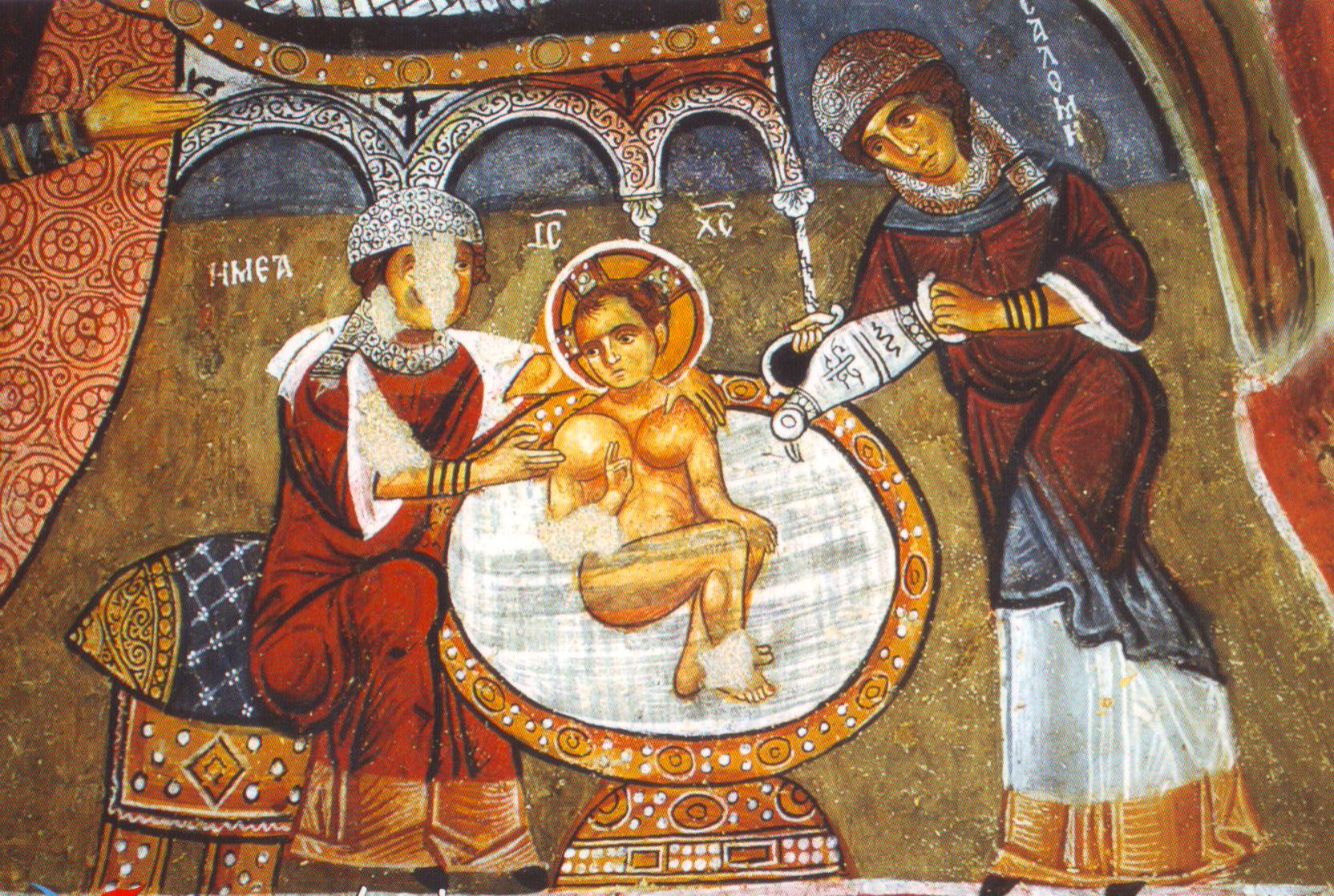
Salome (right) and the midwife "Emea" (left), bathing the infant Jesus, is a common figure in Orthodox icons of the Nativity of Jesus; here in a 12th-century fresco from Cappadocia.

Salome appears in the apocryphal Gospel known as the Gospel of James as an associate of the unnamed midwife at the Nativity of Jesus, and is regularly depicted with the midwife in Eastern Orthodox icons of the Nativity of Jesus, though she has long vanished from most Western depictions. Salome herself is clearly distinguished from "the midwife" in this infancy gospel attributed to James the Just, also known as the Protevangelion of James. The passage in Chapter XIX and XX reads, in the edition and translation by M. R. James:

(Ch XIX, 3) And the midwife went forth of the cave and Salome met her. And she said to her: Salome, Salome, a new sight have I to tell thee. A virgin hath brought forth, which her nature alloweth not. And Salome said: As the Lord my God liveth, if I make not trial and prove her nature I will not believe that a virgin hath brought forth.

(XX. 1) And the midwife went in and said unto Mary: Order thyself, for there is no small contention arisen concerning thee. And Salome made trial and cried out and said: Woe unto mine iniquity and mine unbelief, because I have tempted the living God, and lo, my hand falleth away from me in fire. And she bowed her knees unto the Lord, saying: O God of my fathers, remember that I am the seed of Abraham and Isaac and Jacob: make me not a public example unto the children of Israel, but restore me unto the poor, for thou knowest, Lord, that in thy name did I perform my cures, and did receive my hire of thee. 3 And lo, an angel of the Lord appeared, saying unto her: Salome, Salome, the Lord hath hearkened to thee: bring thine hand near unto the young child and take him up, and there shall be unto thee salvation and joy. 4 And Salome came near and took him up, saying: I will do him worship, for a great king is born unto Israel. And behold immediately Salome was healed: and she went forth of the cave justified. And lo, a voice saying: Salome, Salome, tell none of the marvels which thou hast seen, until the child enter into Jerusalem.

J. R. Porter writes that the above passage is "clearly an adaptation of the episode of Doubting Thomas." There are also other versions of the story in various texts. Greek paintings, as in the illustration here, often labelled the midwife as "Emea" (ΗΜΕΑ, ἡ μαῖα, "the midwife"), and in the West this was sometimes taken to be her name, rather than her job. The fact that Salome is the first, after the midwife, to bear witness to the birth and to recognize Jesus as the Christ, are circumstances that tend to connect her with Salome the disciple. By the High Middle Ages this Salome was often identified with Mary Salome in the West, and therefore regarded as the believing midwife.
