= Holy Kinship =

Extended family of Jesus

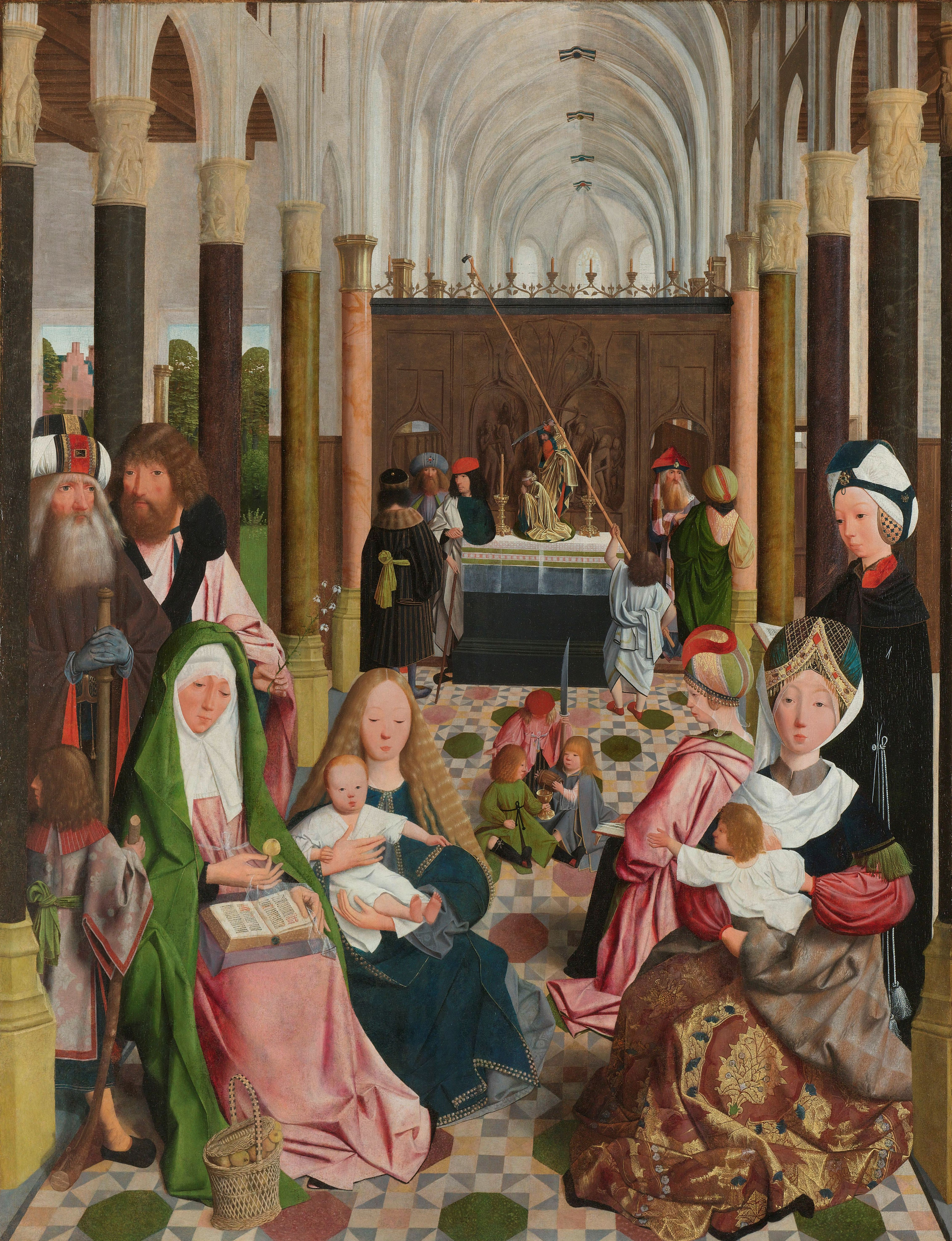
The Holy Kinship by Geertgen tot Sint Jans (c. 1490) Oil on wood, 100 by 70 centimetres (39 in × 28 in), now in the Rijksmuseum, Amsterdam

The Holy Kinship (German: Heilige Sippe, Dutch: Heilige Maagschap) was the extended family of Jesus supposedly descended from his maternal grandmother Saint Anne through her trinubium or three marriages. The group were a popular subject in religious art throughout Germany and the Low Countries, especially during the late 15th and early 16th centuries, but rarely after the Council of Trent. According to this medieval tradition, Saint Anne, the mother of the Virgin Mary, was grandmother not just to Jesus but also to five of the twelve apostles: John the Evangelist, James the Greater, James the Less, Simon and Jude. These apostles, together with John the Baptist, were all cousins of Jesus.

Smaller groups of Jesus and his parents, often plus his cousin John the Baptist and John's mother Elizabeth (Gospel of Luke 1:36) and perhaps Saint Anne, are known as the Holy Family, and were considerably more common in art. After the Council of Trent dismissed the legend of the three marriages of Anne, the full subject was thereafter rarely painted, although the limited group of the families of the cousins Jesus and John the Baptist remained in use.

== Trinubium ==
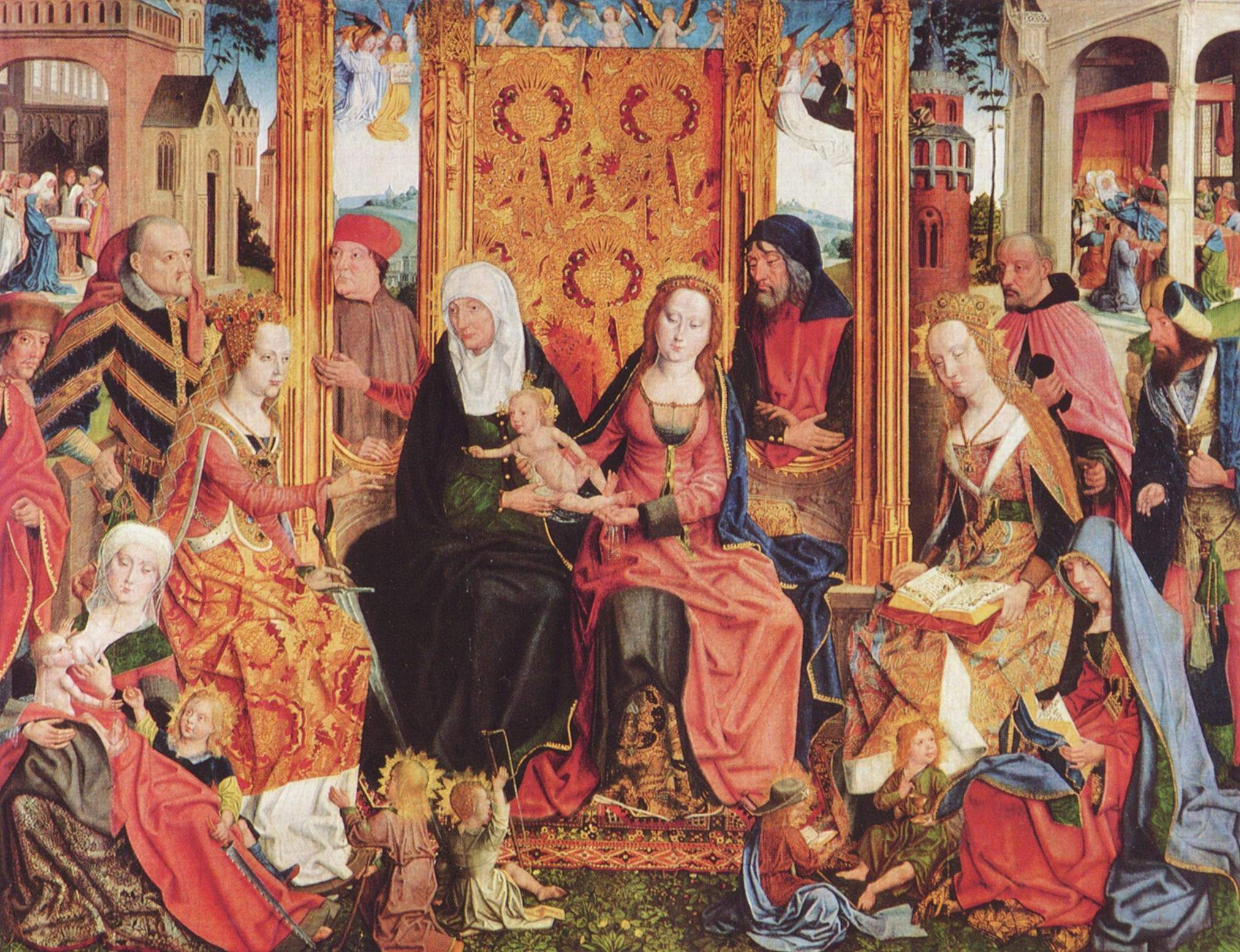
Master of the Holy Kinship, 1500

The basis for this family tree rests upon the trinubium, the tradition that Anne had married three times, and had had three daughters, the Three Marys, each called Mary and with different fathers. The genealogy in question was often encapsulated in short verses from the 12th century onwards. The more or less standard form of this menmonic poem is the one included by Jacobus de Voragine in his Golden Legend. That version runs thus:

Anna solet dici tres concepisse Marias,
Quas genuere viri Joachim, Cleophas, Salomeque.
Has duxere viri Joseph, Alpheus, Zebedeus.
Prima parit Christum, Jacobum secunda minorem,
Et Joseph justum peperit cum Simone Judam,
Tertia majorem Jacobum volucremque Johannem.

Anna is usually said to have conceived three Marys,
Whom her husbands Joachim, Cleophas, and Salome begot.
These [Marys] the men Joseph, Alphaeus, and Zebedee took in marriage.
The first bore Christ; the second bore James the Less,
Joseph the Just, with Simon [and] Jude;
The third, James the Greater and the winged John.

The legend of the three marriages probably originated in the 9th century with Haimo of Auxerre's Historiae sacrae epitome. This list totals 17 people, all of whom might be shown, plus sometimes others. The Geertgen tot Sint Jans has nineteen figures. Although the character of the older generations is matriarchal, notably, the youngest generation, shown as children, are all male. They often carry their attributes, as do the three boys in the centre of the Geertgen: the saw (Simon), barrel (James the Great) and chalice (John the Evangelist).

Extra figures may relate to a local Dutch legendary genealogy which held that Anne’s sister, Hismeria (or Esmeria), was the mother of John the Baptist's mother Elizabeth and of a second child, Eliud, who was in turn the grandfather of Servatius of Tongeren, a 4th-century bishop in the Netherlands.

== Salomite controversy ==
The legend of the trinubium came under attack soon after it began spreading. In the 1170s, Prior Maurice of Kirkham wrote treatise Against the Salomites, those who believed that the disciple Salome mentioned in the Gospel of Mark was a man and the husband of Anne. Herbert of Bosham also refuted this idea in a letter to Count Henry I of Champagne, but the idea was picked up by Peter Lombard and thus became established. In the 13th century, it was refuted by Thomas Aquinas in his commentaries but this had little impact. The attacks of Jacques Lefèvre d'Étaples in 1517–1519, however, were decisive.

== Gallery ==
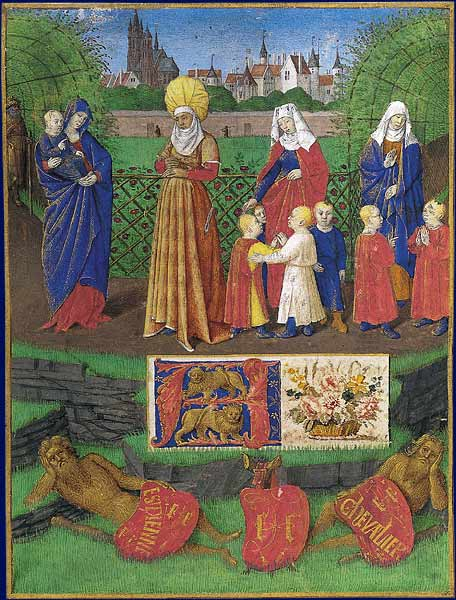
Saint Anne and the Three Marys, Jean Fouquet

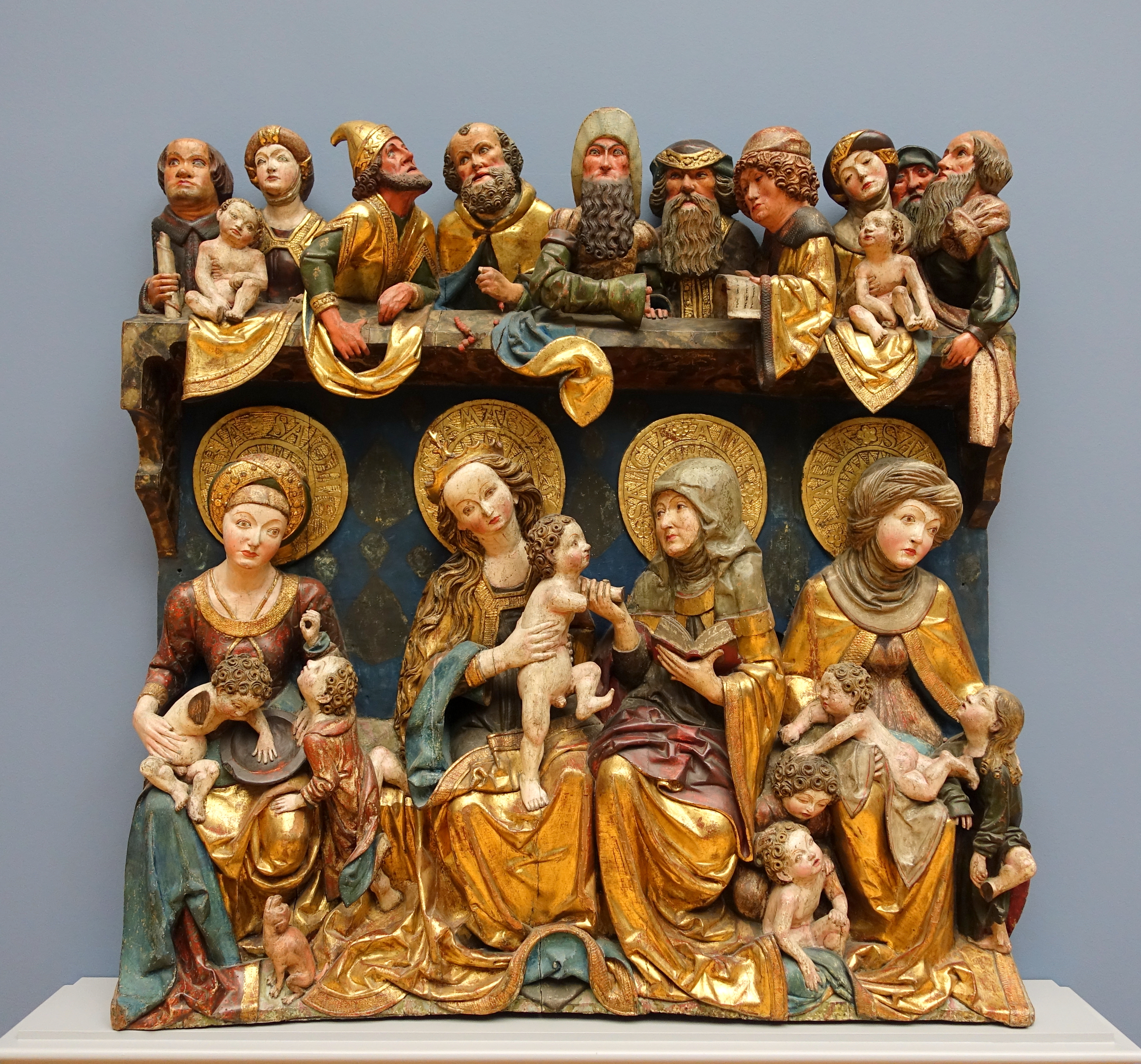
Beechwood relief sculpture from Silesia, c. 1500

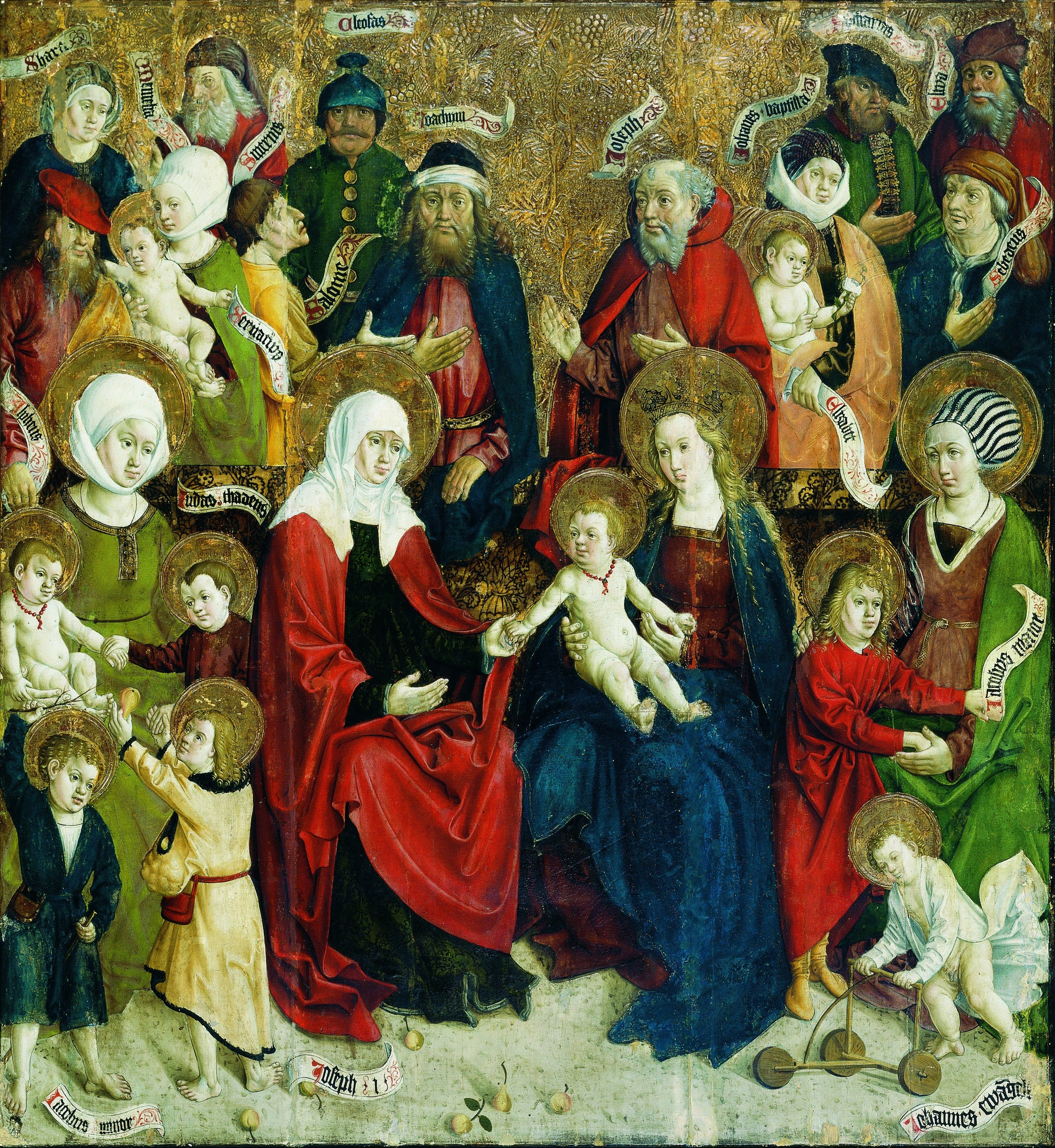
Master from Okoličné, c. 1510, with 25 figures

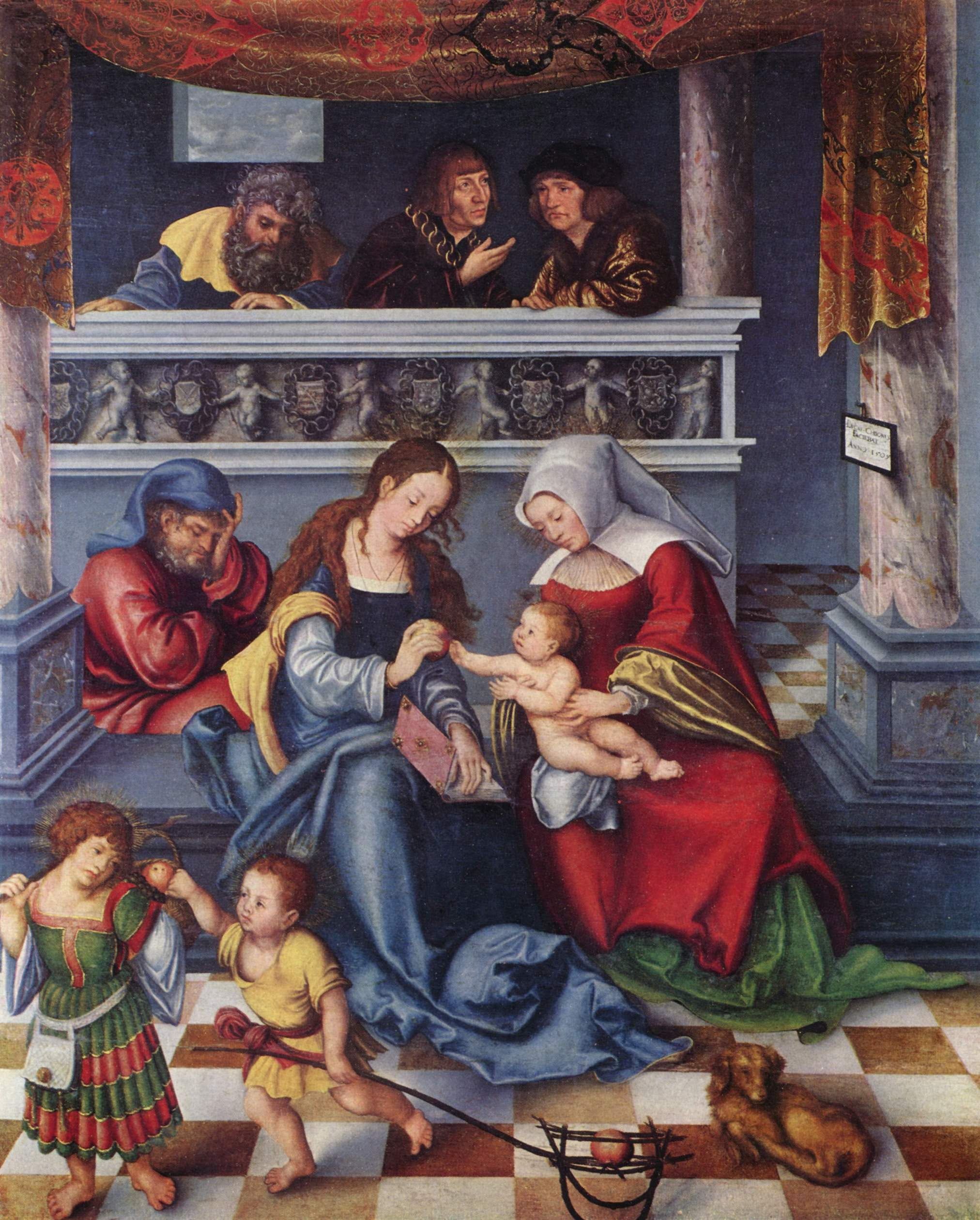
Lucas Cranach the Elder

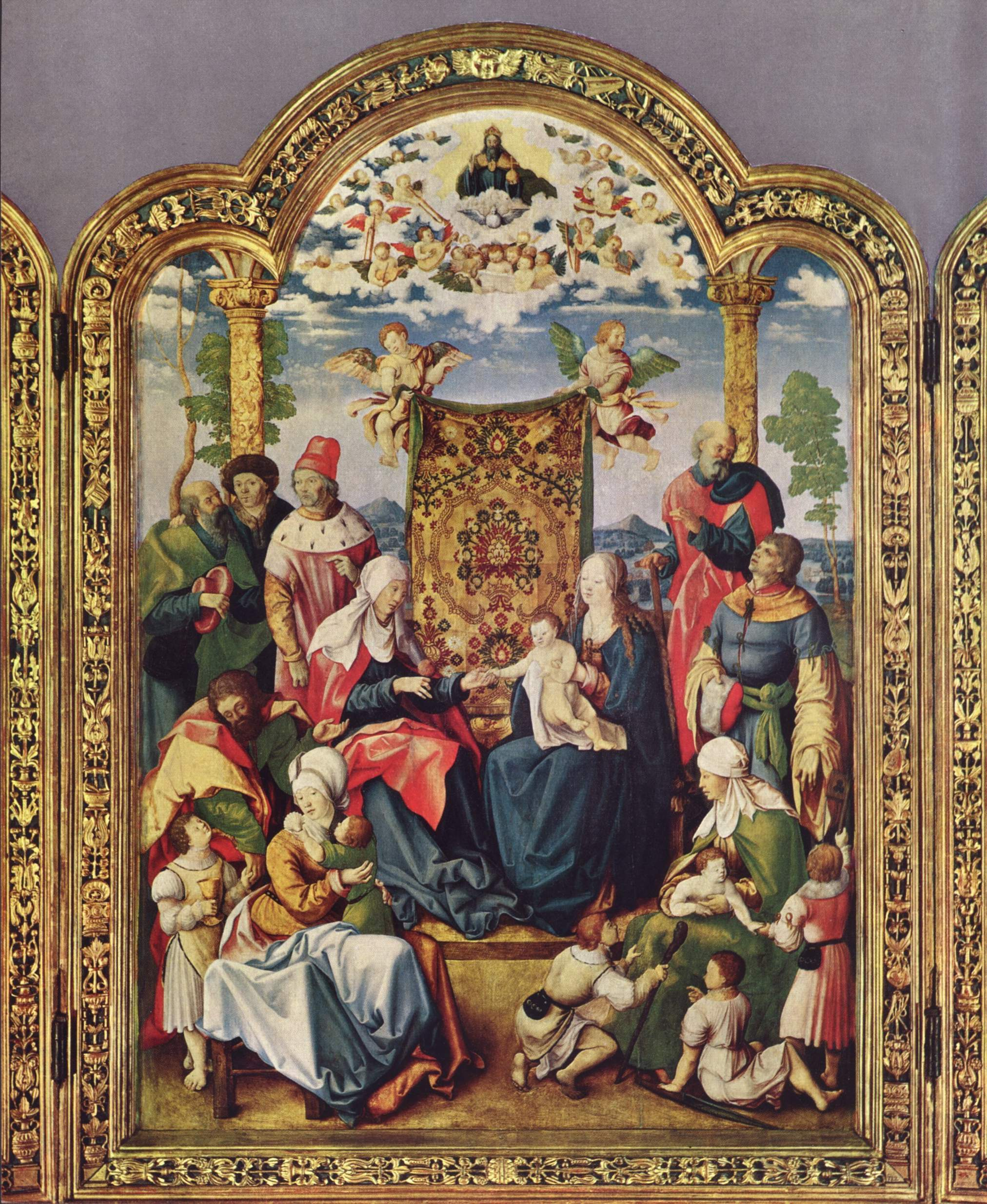
Wolf Traut

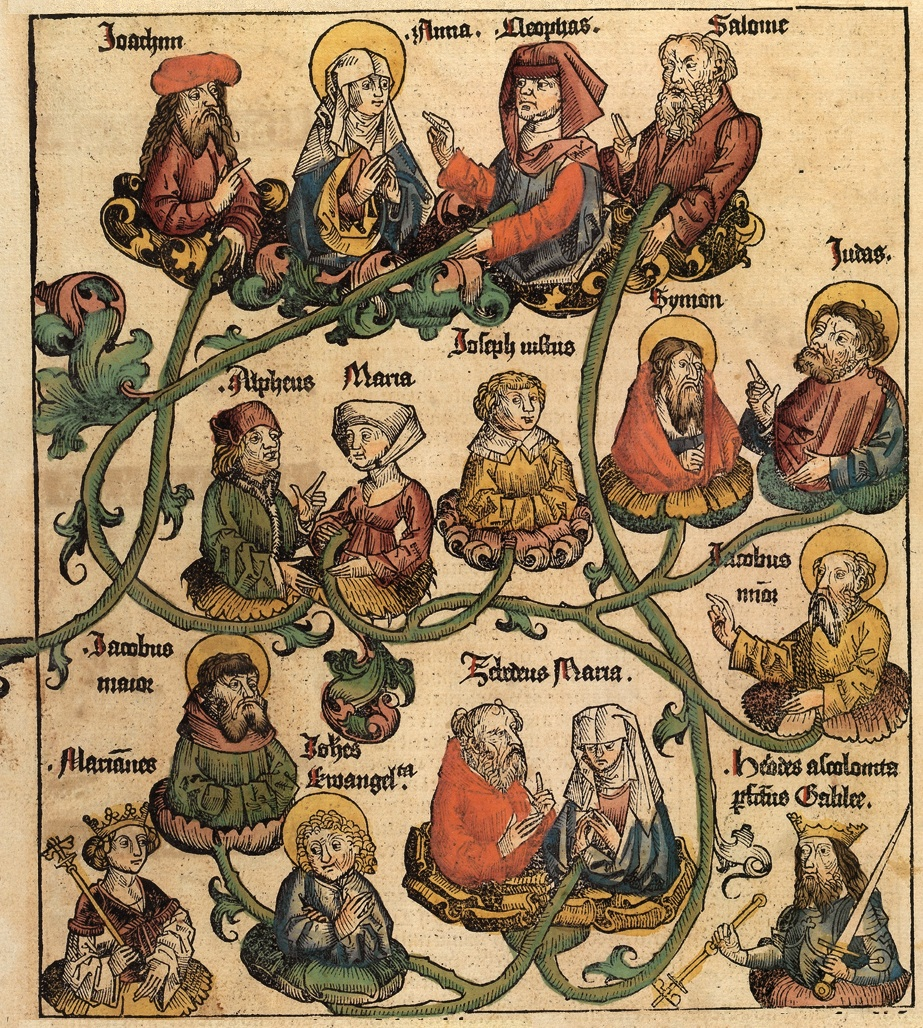
Nuremberg Chronicles

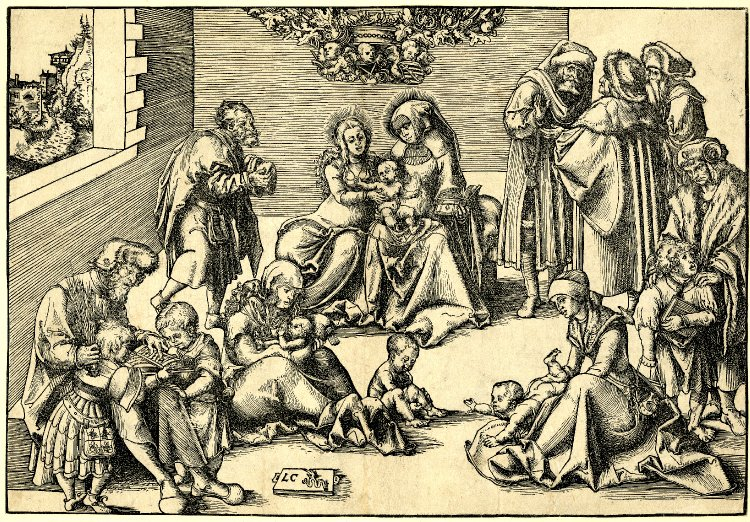
Woodcut by Lucas Cranach the Elder, 1509-10

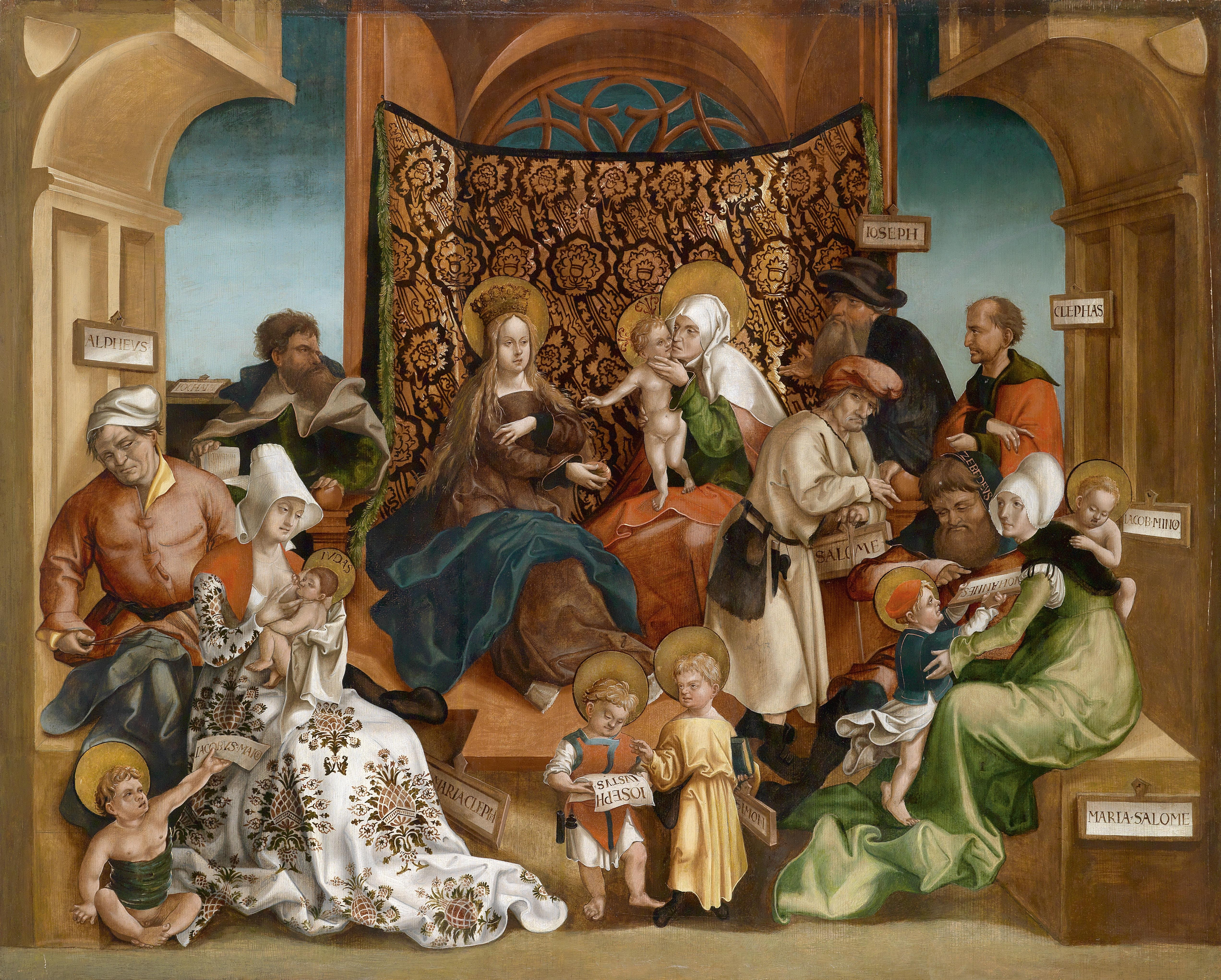
Jörg Breu the Elder and the Younger
