= Master of the Holy Kinship =

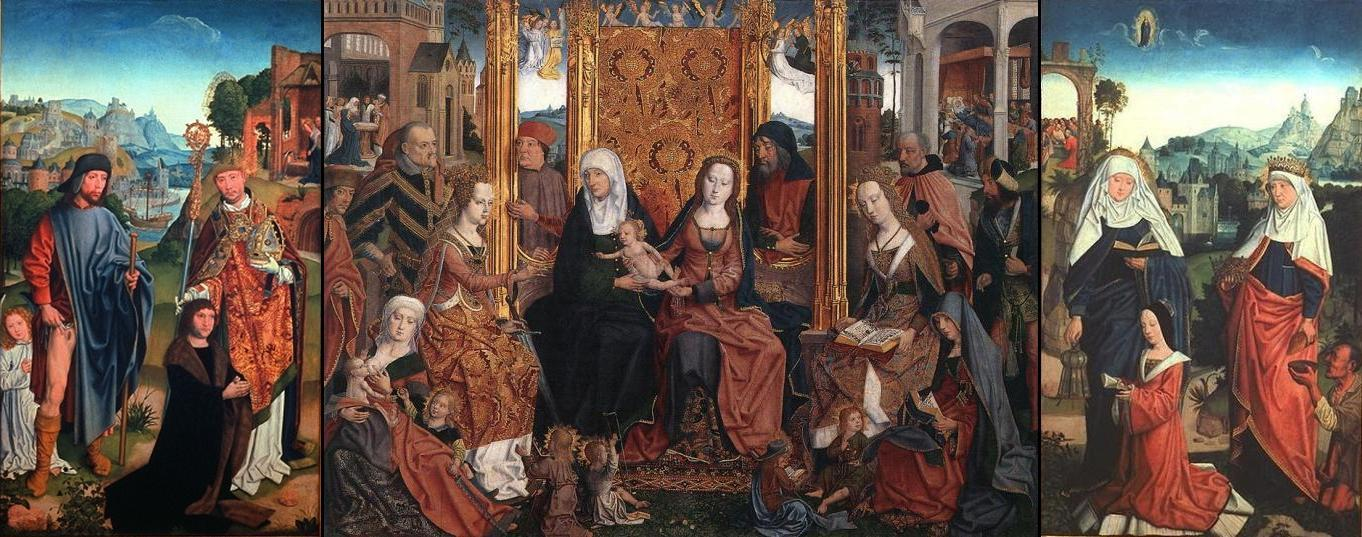
Altar of the Holy Kinship

The Master of the Holy Kinship the Younger is a German painter of the Middle Ages who was active between 1475 and 1515 in Cologne and its environs. He is designated "The Younger" to distinguish him from another Master, given the same name, who worked in that area from 1410 to 1440.

== Works ==
His notname is derived from a shuttered altarpiece at the Wallraf-Richartz-Museum in Cologne, created c.1503. The central part of the triptych is a Holy Kinship scene, with Saint Catherine and Saint Barbara, which also makes it a mystical marriage tableau. It was commissioned, presumably for donation to a church, by Nikasius Hackeney, a tax administrator at the Imperial Court, and includes donor portraits of him and his family.

An attempt to identify the Master as Lambert von Luytge, a painter who was active in Cologne at roughly the same time, was inconclusive. The works attributed to him are rich, numerous and varied, ranging from large altarpieces to small devotional paintings and stained glass boxes. The size of his output suggests that he was operating a large workshop. Speculation on where he may have originated and received his training centers on resemblances to the work of Stefan Lochner and certain Flemish painters, such as Rogier van der Weyden, Justus van Gent and Hugo van der Goes. Connections have also been suggested with the Master of the Life of the Virgin and the Master of the Saint Bartholomew Altarpiece.

Art historians distinguish two periods in his work. Around 1490, he appears to have made a trip to the Netherlands, after which his tones become darker, his composition more precise and his scenes more realistic. These new trends come to full fruition in an epitaph painted for the curé Jacob Udeman von Erkelenz, in 1492.

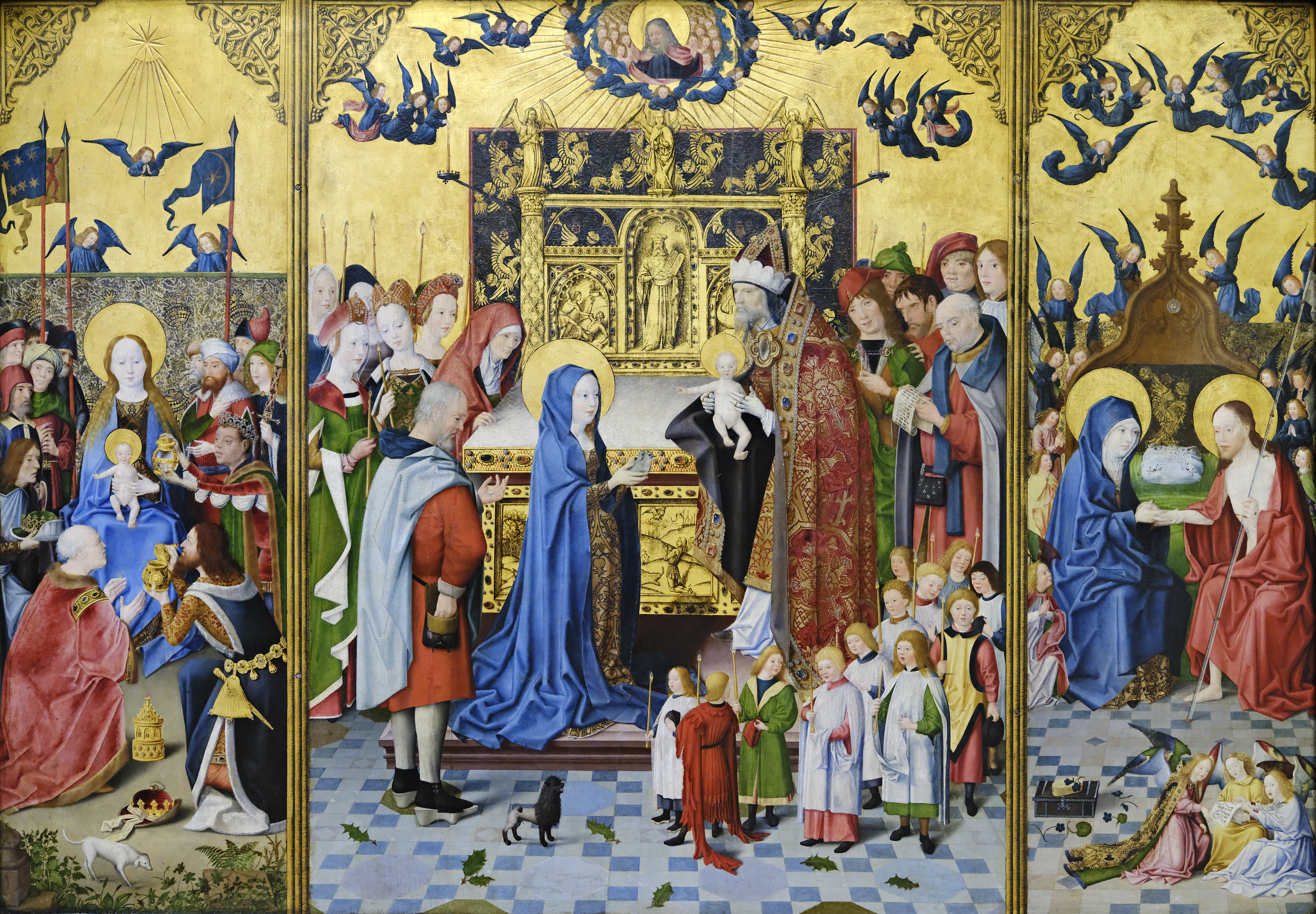
The Seven Joys of Mary

Other major works include:

- An "Altarpiece of the Seven Joys of Mary" (c.1480). Originally in the Benedictine convent in Cologne; now in the Louvre Museum.
- Three "Masses of Saint Gregory" one each in the Museum Catharijneconvent (Utrecht), the Wallraf-Richartz-Museum (originally at Heisterbach Abbey) and Kolumba, the Cologne diocesan museum.
- "Circumcision of Christ", originally part of the altarpiece at St. Kolumba, Cologne, now at the Alte Pinakothek in Munich. It was a donation from the Municipal Councilor, Johann von Questenberg and his wife.
- "Apocalyptic Madonna", at the Wallraf-Richartz-Museum. It was commissioned by the family of Count Gumprecht II of Neuenahr in 1484, to commemorate his recent death.
