= Elizabeth Cunningham =

American feminist novelist

- Born: 1953 (age 72–73)
- Education: Harvard University
- Occupation: Novelist
- Writing career
- Genre: Poetry

Elizabeth Cunningham (born 1953) is a feminist visionary novelist and author of The Maeve Chronicles, which includes the books The Passion of Mary Magdalen, Magdalen Rising (a prequel), Bright Dark Madonna and Red-Robed Priestess. Earlier books include The Wild Mother and How To Spin Straw Into Gold.

== Biography ==
A descendant of nine generations of Episcopal priests, Cunningham expressed the desire to reconcile her Christian origins with a sense of the Divine Feminine. She completed her undergraduate work in English at Harvard in 1976. Now an ordained interfaith minister, she is in private practice as a counselor. Cunningham is also director of the Center at High Valley in New York's Hudson Valley.

She is a Fellow Emeritus of Black Earth Institute.
