= Salome (disciple) =

Follower of Jesus

Saint Salome
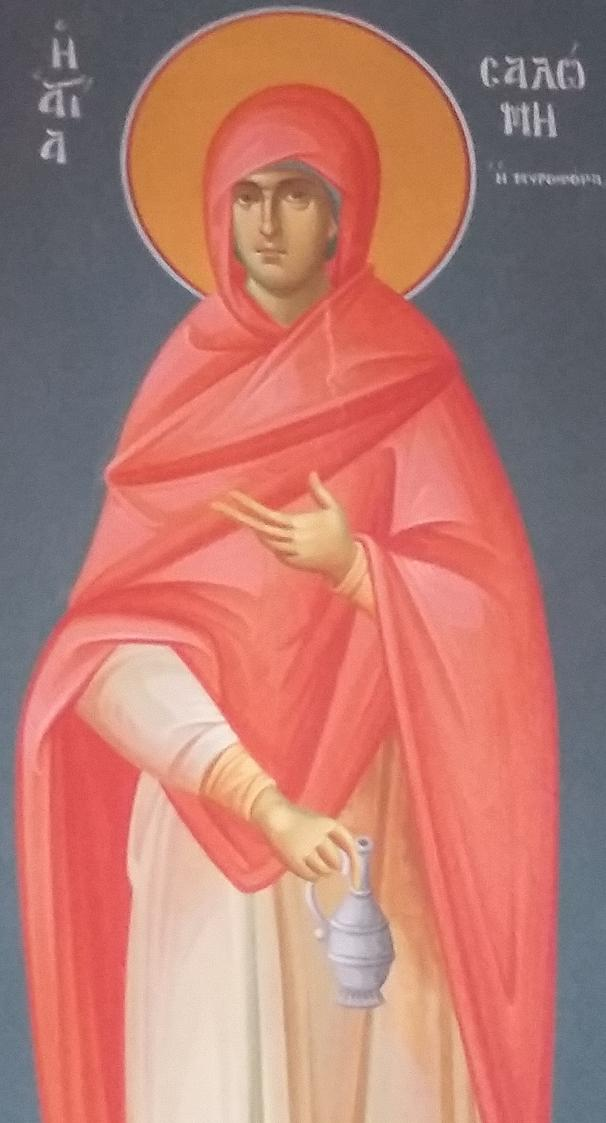
- Greek fresco of St Salome

Myrrhbearer, Midwife
- Died: 1st century
- Venerated in: Catholic Church; Eastern Orthodox Church
- Feast: 24 April (Roman Catholic Church); 3 August (Eastern Orthodox, some Eastern Catholic and Lutheran Church–Missouri Synod); Sunday of the Myrrhbearers (Eastern Orthodox and some Eastern Catholic)
- Attributes: Vase of ointment

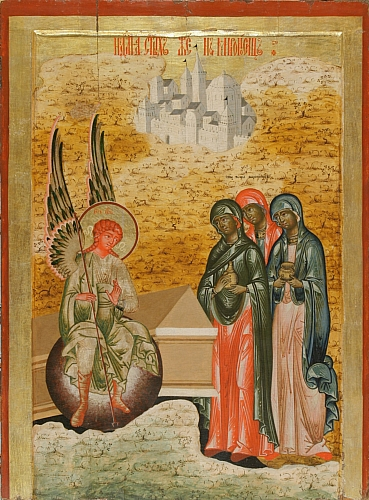
Eastern Orthodox icon of the two Marys and Salome at the Tomb of Jesus (Kizhi, 18th century)

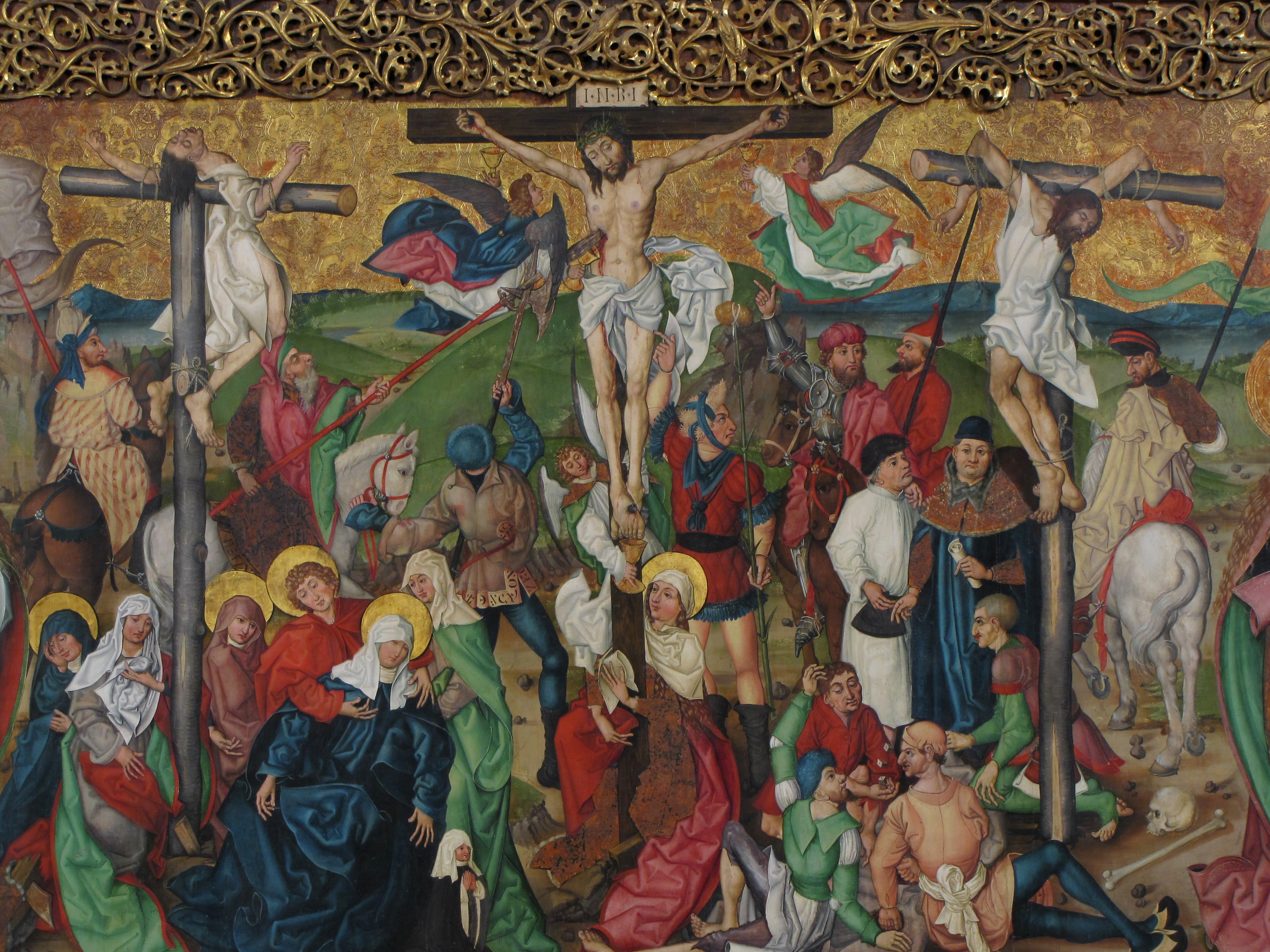
Crucifixion, from the Buhl Altarpiece, 1490s. Salome is one of the two leftmost women with a halo.

Salome was a follower of Jesus who appears briefly in the canonical gospels and at greater length in apocryphal writings. Mark names her among the women present at the crucifixion and as one of the Myrrhbearers who found the empty tomb. Later interpretation identified her with women mentioned but not named elsewhere in the gospels, most often the wife of Zebedee and mother of the apostles James and John, and sometimes with the unnamed sister of Jesus's mother in John 19:25, which would make her Jesus's aunt.

Non-canonical texts treat her more prominently, and several describe her as a disciple rather than a follower: she is named among Jesus's disciples in the Gospel of Thomas and questions him directly in the Greek Gospel of the Egyptians, where the exchange implies a tradition that she was childless. A Salome also appears in the Protevangelium of James as the woman who doubts and then attests the virgin birth, a figure often identified with the disciple from the High Middle Ages onwards and depicted as a midwife in Nativity iconography. Writing in the 2nd century, Celsus recorded a Christian sect that traced itself to her.

Salome is venerated as a saint, commemorated in the Eastern Orthodox Church on the Sunday of the Myrrhbearers and on 3 August, and in the Latin liturgical rites of the Catholic Church on 24 April. A medieval legend held that Saint Anne bore three daughters by different husbands, the Three Marys, among them Salome as "Mary Salome", and her half-sisters Mary Clopas, and the virgin Mary. Popularised by the Golden Legend and widely painted as part of the Holy Kinship, the legend was rejected by Protestants at the Reformation and by Catholic theologians at the Council of Trent.

== Name ==
"Salome" may be the Hellenized form of a Hebrew name derived from the root word שָׁלוֹם (shalom), meaning "peace".

The name was a common one; apart from the famous dancing "daughter of Herodias", both a sister and daughter of Herod the Great were called Salome, as well as Queen Salome Alexandra (d. 67 BC), the last independent ruler of Judea.

== In the canonical gospels ==
In Mark 15:40–41, Salome is named as one of the women present at the crucifixion who also ministered to Jesus: "There were also women looking on afar off: among whom was Mary Magdalene, and Mary the mother of James and of Joses; and Salome who also followed Him and ministered to Him when he was in Galilee. And many other women who followed Him to Jerusalem."(15:40–41, King James Version) The parallel passage of Matthew 27:56 reads thus: "Among which was Mary Magdalene, and Mary the mother of James and Joses, and the mother of Zebedee's children." The Catholic Encyclopedia (1913) concludes that the Salome of Mark 15:40 is probably identical with the mother of the sons of Zebedee in Matthew; the latter is also mentioned in Matthew 20:20, in which she petitions Jesus to let her sons sit with him in Paradise.

In John, three, or perhaps four, women are mentioned at the crucifixion; this time they are named as Jesus' "mother, and his mother's sister, Mary the wife of Cleophas, and Mary Magdalene." (John 19:25 KJV) A common interpretation identifies Salome as the sister of Jesus' mother, thus making her Jesus' aunt. Traditional interpretations associate Mary the wife of Cleophas (the third woman in the Gospel of John) with Mary the mother of James son of Alphaeus (the third woman in the Gospel of Matthew).

In the Gospel of Mark, Salome is among the women who went to Jesus' tomb to anoint his body with spices. "And when the sabbath was past, Mary Magdalene, and Mary the mother of James, and Salome, had bought sweet spices, that they might come and anoint him." (Mark 16:1 KJV) They discovered that the stone had been rolled away, and a young man in white then told them that Jesus had risen, and told them to tell Jesus' disciples that he would meet them in Galilee. In Matthew 28:1, two women are mentioned in the parallel passage: Mary Magdalene and the "other Mary" – identified previously in Matthew 27:56 as Mary the mother of James and Joses.

The canonical gospels never go so far as to label Salome a "disciple" ("pupil" mathētēs), and so mainstream Christian writers usually describe her as a "follower" of Jesus per references to the women who "followed" and "ministered" to Jesus (Mark 15:41). However, feminist critiques have argued that the mainstream tradition consistently underplays the significance of Jesus's female supporters.

== In non-canonical works ==
The Gospel of Thomas found at Nag Hammadi mentions among the "disciples" of Jesus two women, Salome and Mary.

The Diatessaron, which is part of the Ante-Nicene Fathers collection, separates Salome and the mother of the sons of Zebedee as two distinct persons, contrary to tradition that identify them. "And there were in the distance all the acquaintance of Jesus standing, and the women that came with Him from Galilee, those that followed Him and ministered. One of them was Mary Magdalene; and Mary the mother of James the little and Joses, and the mother of the sons of Zebedee, and Salome, and many others which came up with Him unto Jerusalem." (Diatessaron 52:21–23)

The controversial Secret Gospel of Mark, that was referred to and quoted in the Mar Saba letter ascribed by his modern editors to Clement of Alexandria, contains a further mention of Salome which is not present in the canonical Mark at 10:46. Clement quotes the passage in his letter: "Then he came into Jericho. And the sister of the young man whom Jesus loved was there with his mother and Salome, but Jesus would not receive them." The lines complete a well-known lacuna in Mark as the text currently stands.

In the non-canonical Greek Gospel of the Egyptians (2nd century), Salome appears again as a disciple of Jesus. She asks him how long death would hold sway, and he says to her, "So long as women bring forth, for I come to end the works of the female." To this Salome replies, "Then I have done well in not bringing forth." It would appear from this text that there was an early tradition that Salome the disciple was childless, and possibly unmarried.

In the Gospel of Thomas there is a reference to Jesus reclining on a couch and eating at a table that belonged to Salome and being asked by her: "Who are you sir, that you have taken your place on my couch and eaten from my table?" Jesus answers: "I am he who is from the One, and the things that belong to the Father have been given to me." Salome replies, "But I am your disciple", and Jesus answers, "When the disciple is united he will be filled with light, but if he is divided he will be filled with darkness."

A 2nd-century Greek, Celsus, wrote a True Discourse attacking the Christian sects as a threat to the Roman state. He described the variety of Christian sects at the time he was writing, c. AD 178, as extremely broad. His treatise is lost, but quotes survive in the attack written somewhat later by Origen, Contra Celsum ("Against Celsus"): "While some of the Christians proclaim [that] they have the same god as do the Jews, others insist that there is another god higher than the creator-god and opposed to him. And some Christians teach that the Son came from this higher god. Still others admit of a third god – those, that is to say, who call themselves gnostics – and still others, though calling themselves Christians, want to live according to the laws of the Jews. I could also mention those who call themselves Simonians after Simon, and those naming themselves Helenians after Helen, his consort. There are Christian sects named after Marcellina, Harpocratian Christians who trace themselves to Salome, and some who follow Mariamne and others who follow Martha, and still others who call themselves Marcionites after their leader, Marcion."

In the early Christian texts, there are several other references to "Salome". A Salome appears in the infancy gospel attached to the name of James the Just, the Protevangelion of James, ch. XIV:

"14 And the midwife went out from the cave, and Salome met her. 15 And the midwife said to her, "Salome, Salome, I will tell you a most surprising thing, which I saw. 16 A virgin has brought forth, which is a thing contrary to nature." 17 To which Salome replied, "As the Lord my God lives, unless I receive particular proof of this matter, I will not believe that a virgin has brought forth."

18 Then Salome went in, and the midwife said, "Mary, show yourself, for a great controversy has arisen about you." 19 And Salome tested her with her finger. 20 But her hand was withered, and she groaned bitterly, 21 and said, "Woe to me, because of my iniquity! For I have tempted the living God, and my hand is ready to drop off."

That Salome is the first, after the midwife, to bear witness to the Miraculous Birth and to recognize Jesus as the Christ, are circumstances that tend to connect her with Salome the disciple. By the High Middle Ages this Salome was often (but not always) identified with Mary Salome in the West, and therefore regarded as the believing midwife.

Salome as midwife
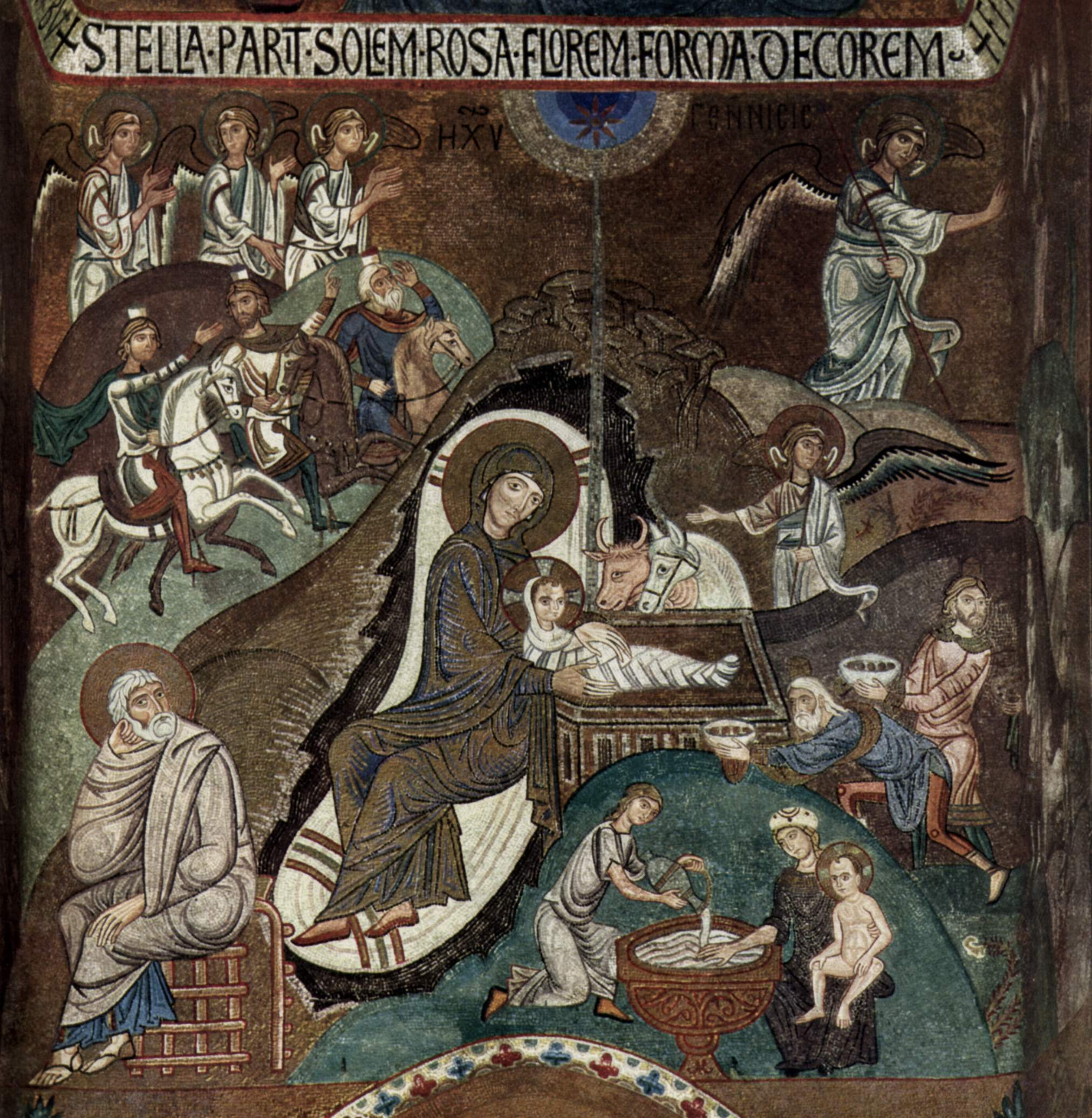
Cappella Palatina, Palermo, c. 1150

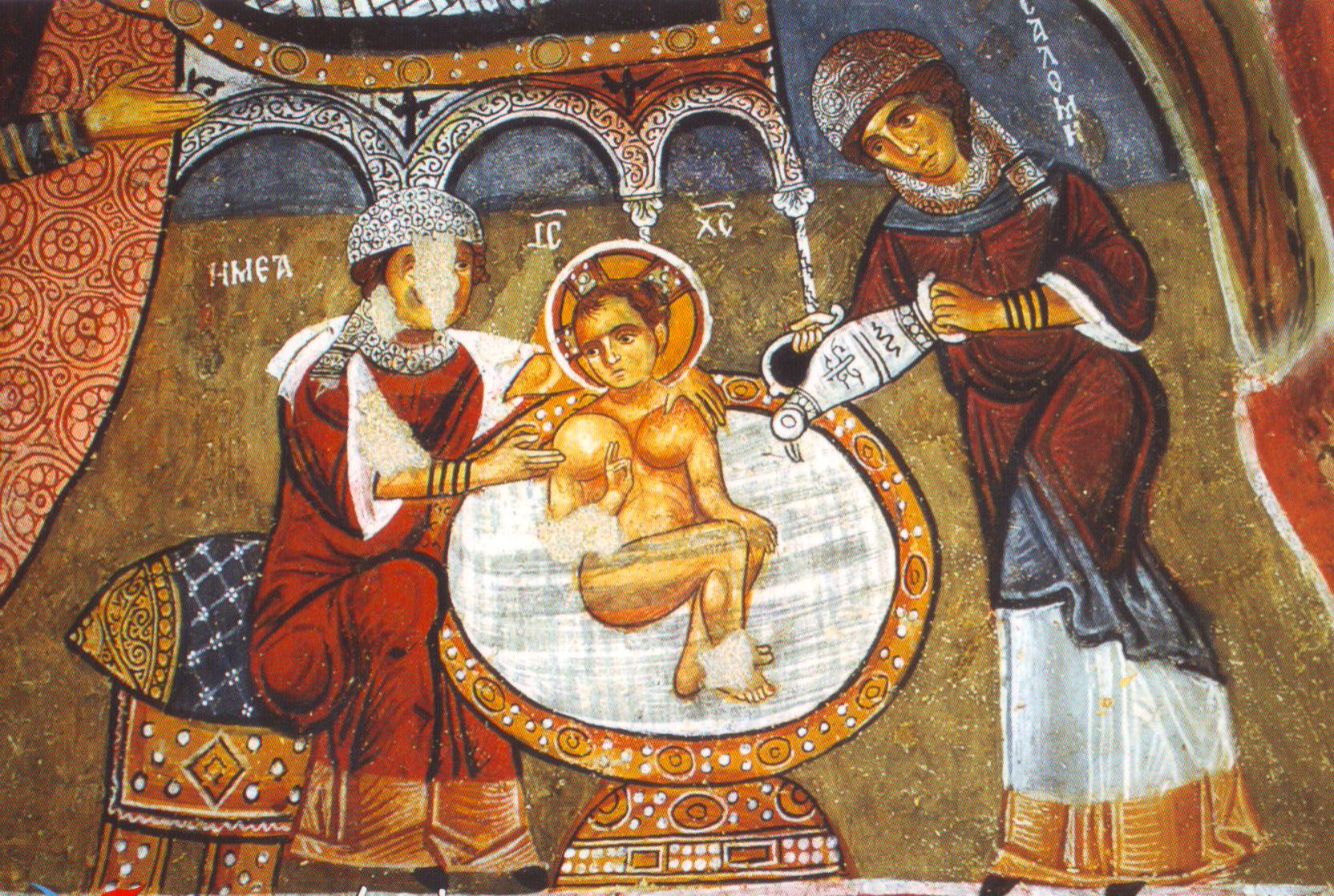
Salome (right) and the midwife (left), bathing the infant Jesus, is a common figure in Orthodox icons of the Nativity (fresco, 12th century, "Dark Church", Open Air Museum, Goreme, Cappadocia).

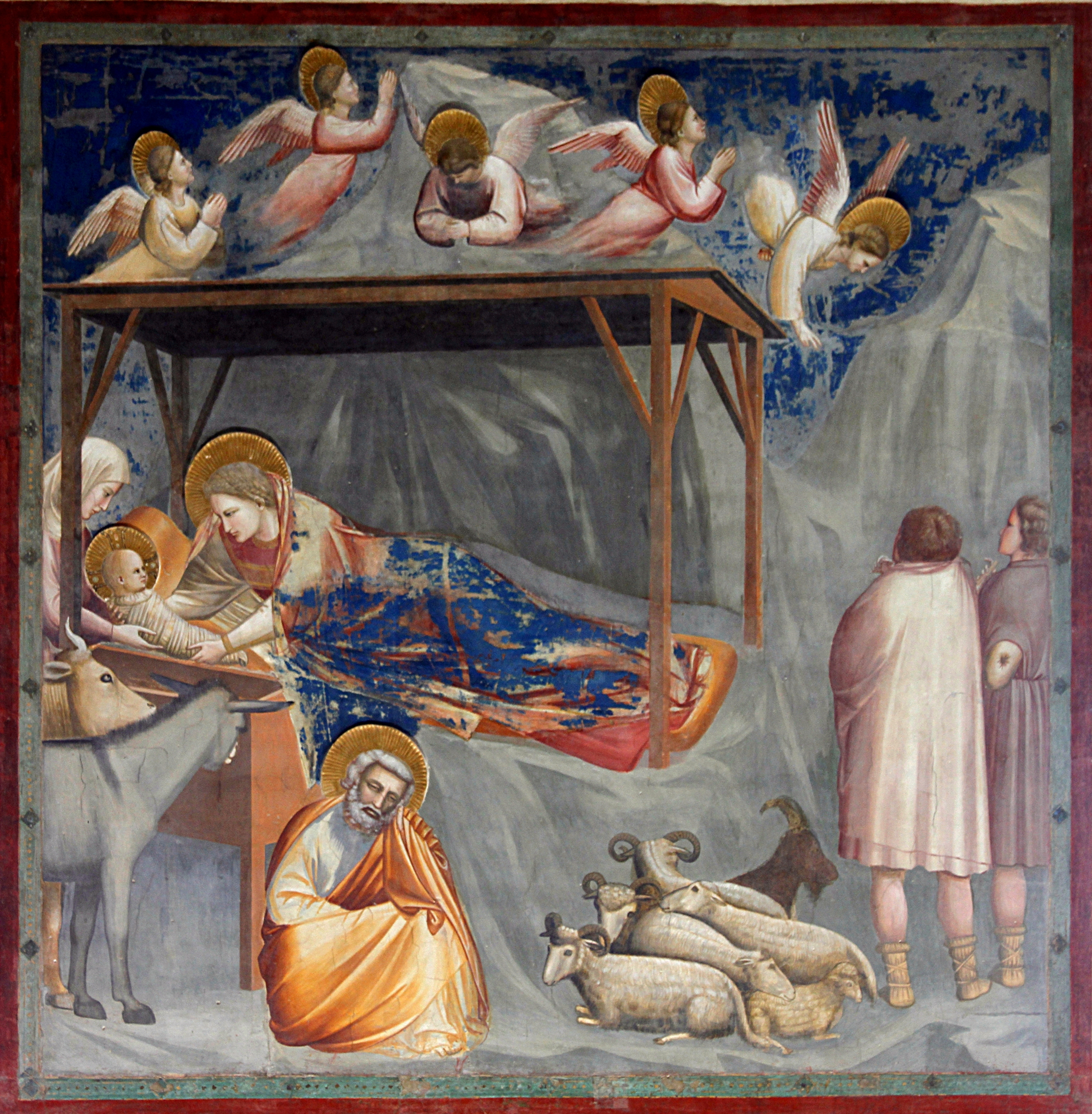
Capella dei Scrovegni, Padua, Giotto (1267–1337)

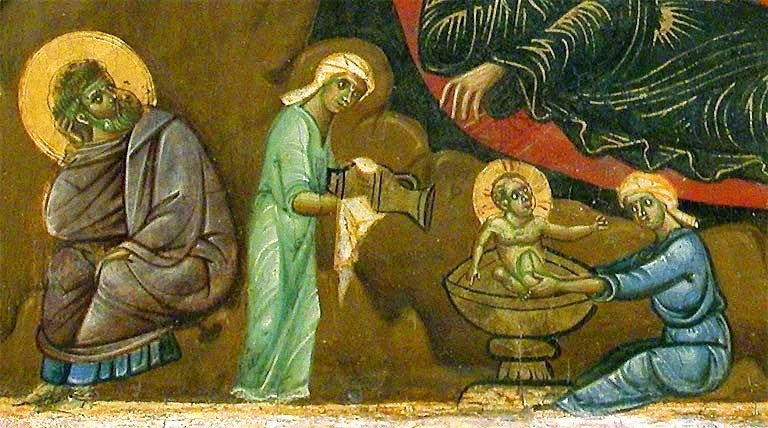
Guido da Siena, 13th century

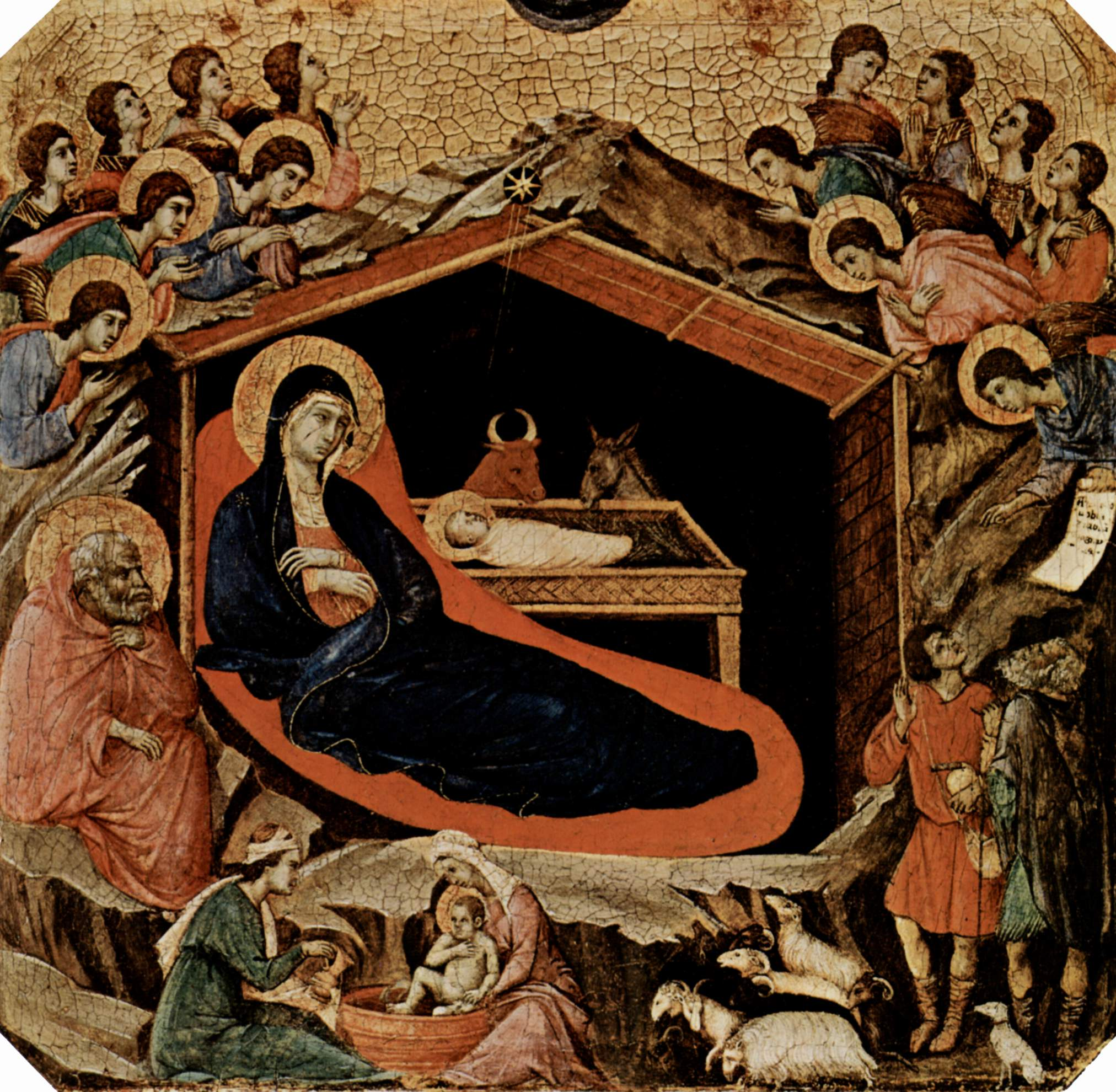
Duccio 1308–1311

An apocryphal Coptic Book of the Resurrection of Christ, attributed to the apostle Bartholomew, names the women who went to the tomb. Among them were: Mary Magdalene; Mary the mother of James, whom Jesus delivered out of the hand of Satan; Mary who ministered to him; Martha her sister; Joanna (perhaps also Susanna) who renounced the marriage bed; and "Salome who tempted him".

== Sainthood ==
Saint Salome is commemorated in the Eastern Orthodox Church on the Sunday of the Myrrhbearers, i.e., the third Sunday of Pascha (Easter), and on 3 August.

Her feast day in the Latin liturgical rites of the Catholic Church is 24 April.

She is commemorated in The Episcopal Church on 3 August, as listed in Lesser Feasts and Fasts 2022 as: "Joanna, Mary, and Salome, Myrrh-Bearing Women."

In the Calendar of Saints of the Lutheran Church–Missouri Synod, her feast is on 3 August with Joanna and Mary, mother of James.

In art, she is often portrayed with the Holy Family in paintings of the Holy Kinship. She is also portrayed holding a thurible as a symbol of her sacrifice and faith in Jesus Christ.

== Legend of Saint Anne's three husbands ==
According to a legend propounded by Haymo of Auxerre in the mid-9th century, but rejected by the Council of Trent, Saint Anne had, by different husbands, three daughters, all of whom bore the name Mary and who are referred to as the Three Marys:

- Mary, the mother of Jesus
- Mary of Clopas
- Salome, in this tradition called Mary Salome (as in the tradition of the three Marys at the tomb)

Mary Magdalene is not part of this group. Mary Salome thus becomes the half-sister of the Virgin Mary.

This account was included in the Golden Legend of Jacobus de Voragine, written in about 1260. It was the subject of a long poem in rhymed French written in about 1357 by Jean de Venette. The poem is preserved in a mid-15th-century manuscript on vellum containing 232 pages written in columns. The titles are in red and illuminated in gold. It is decorated with seven miniatures in monochrome gray.

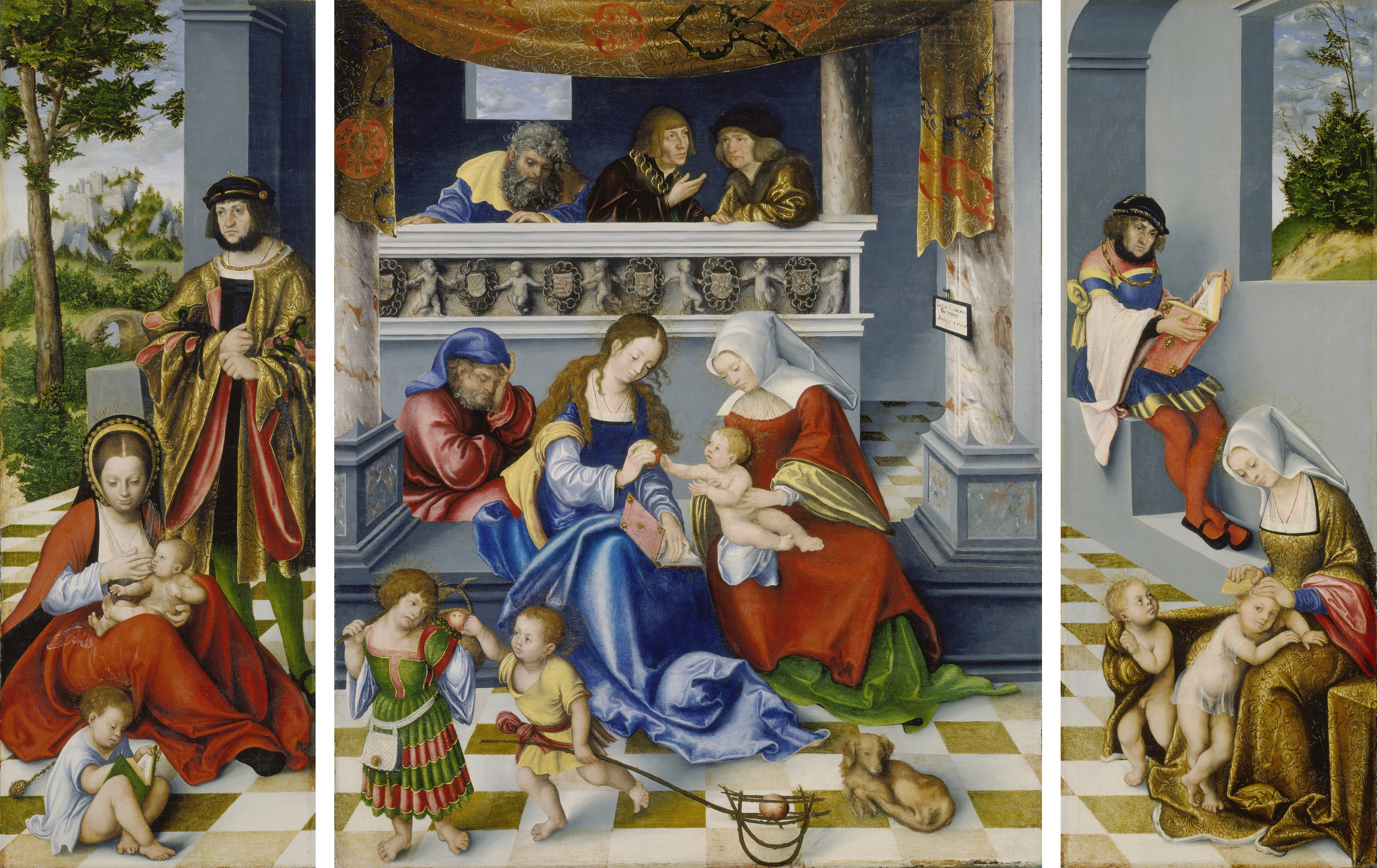
Mary Salome is the figure in the right-hand panel in this altarpiece of the Holy Kinship by Lucas Cranach the Elder.

For some centuries, religious art throughout Germany and the Low Countries frequently presented Saint Anne with her husbands, daughters, sons-in-law and grandchildren as a group known as the Holy Kinship. During the Reformation the idea of the three husbands was rejected by Protestants, and by the Council of Trent by Catholic theologians also, but Salome continued to be regarded as probably the sister of the Virgin Mary, and the wife of Zebedee, and mother of the two apostles. The Catholic Encyclopedia of 1913 said (rather more cautiously than leading 19th-century Protestant books of biblical reference) that "some writers conjecture more or less plausibly that she is the sister of the Blessed Virgin mentioned in John 19:25".

== See also ==
- Holy Kinship
- Mary Salome and Zebedee
- Myrrhbearers
- Saint Sarah
- Salome (Gospel of James)
