= New Testament people named Mary =

Women in the Biblical New Testament

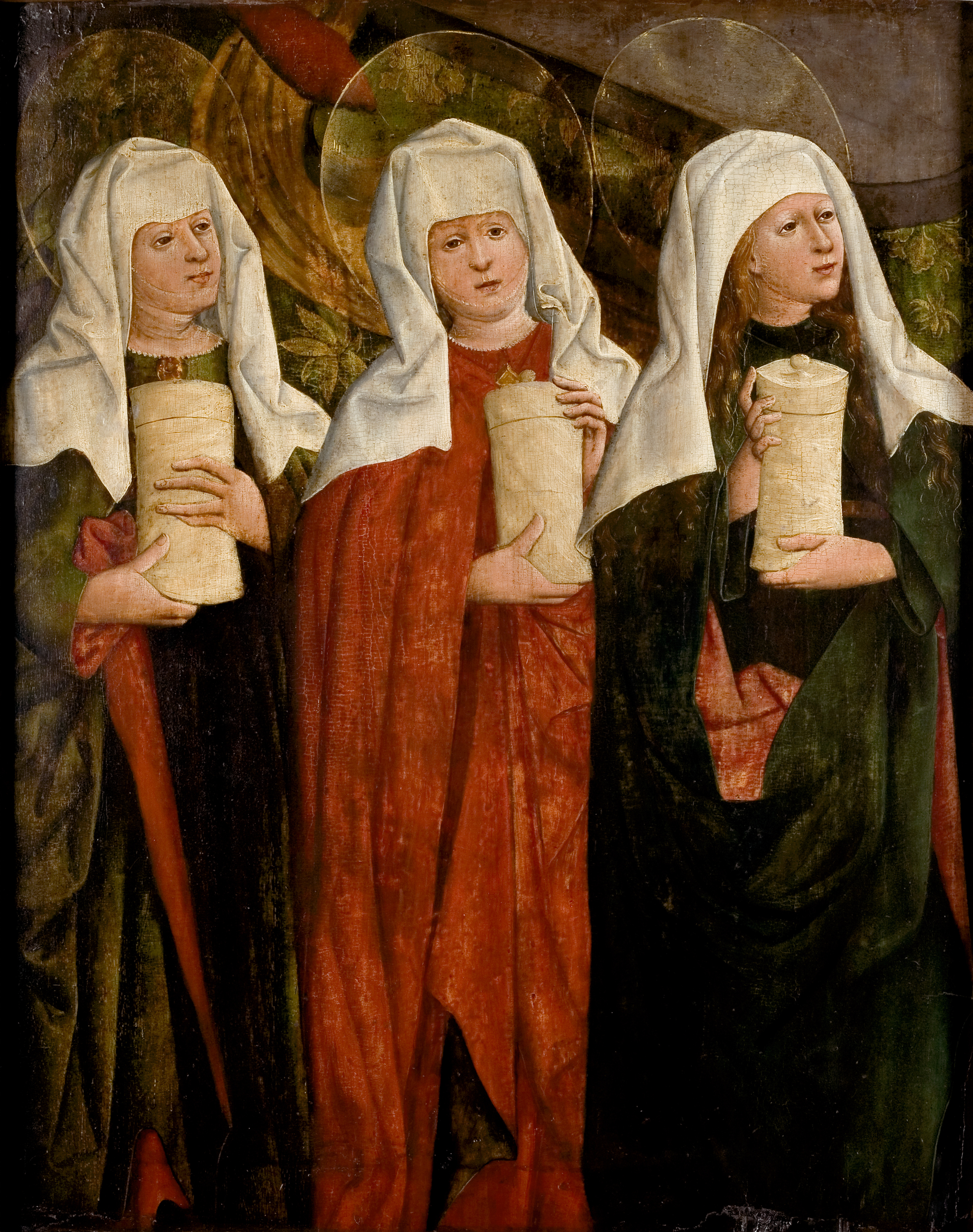
The Three Maries at the Tomb by Mikołaj Haberschrack, 15th century

The name Mary (from Ancient Greek: Μαριάμ or Μαρία from the original Hebrew מרים Miryam), appears 54 times in the New Testament, (Note: Strong's Concordance (1890) identified 54 occurrences of the name Mary (18 times as Μαρία, 27 times as Μαριὰμ, twice as Μαρίαν, and 7 times as Μαρίας) in the King James Version, a 17th-century English translation based on the Byzantine text-type Textus Receptus. The New American Standard Exhaustive Concordance (1998), which employed a critical literal translation based on the Alexandrian text-type Novum Testamentum Graece (Nestle–Aland 27th edition, 1993), also found 54 occurrences, 53 of which were translated as 'Mary' and one as 'Mary's'. Note that some translations may add the name Mary where it is absent in the original Greek text. For example, there is no 'Μαρία' in Matthew 1:24, and likewise the King James Version says 'and took unto him his wife', but the New International Version says 'and took Mary home as his wife', and the Good News Translation says 'he married Mary'.) in 49 verses. It was the single most popular female name among Jews of the Roman province of Judaea at the time, borne by about one in four women, and most of the New Testament references to Mary provide only the barest identifying information. Scholars and traditions therefore differ as to how many distinct women these references represent and which of them refer to the same person.

== Overview ==
=== Historical frequency of the name Mary ===
Mary was the single most popular female name among Jews of the Roman province of Judaea at the time, borne by about one in four women. The most complete research on the frequency of names is provided by scholar Tal Ilan, who in 1989 and 2002 compiled lists of all known names of Jewish women living in Israel/Judaea between 330 BCE and 135 CE and what was then known as Palestine from 135 CE to 200 CE. According to her 1989 data, 58 or 59 out of all 247 female names she found were Mary, accounting for 23.5% of all known names, while 61 other women were called Salome. According to her larger dataset of 2002, however, 80 of 317 women were named Mary (25.2%) and 62 women were called Salome (19.6%). The name Mary, through its Greek forms Maria, Mariam and Mariamme, derives from Miriam, the sister of Moses, and possibly was such a commonly given female in the historical period and region of Jesus because of the popularity of princess Mariamme/Mariamne I the Hasmonean or princess Mariamme/Mariamne II, the second and third wife of king Herod the Great, respectively. In the New Testament Gospels, the frequency of Mary amongst all women who are named (usually numbered six or seven by scholars) is much higher than 25%, while there is only one Salome (the name Salome only appears twice, both in Mark, in reference to the same person), a fact which has puzzled scholars.

=== New Testament frequency of the name Mary ===
The original Koine Greek text of the New Testament mentions the name Mary 54 times in 4 different forms: Μαρία (18 occurrences), Μαριὰμ (27 occurrences), Μαρίαν (2 occurrences), and Μαρίας (7 occurrences). The name Mary is found in 49 verses: in 10 cases, two different Marys are mentioned in a single verse, while in the other 39 cases, there is only one Mary in a verse.

Marys in the New Testament
Character	Verses	Times
Mary, mother of Jesus	Matthew 1:16,18,20; 2:11; 13:55. Mark 6:3. Luke 1:27,30,34,38,39,41,46,56; 2:5,16,19,34. Acts 1:14.	19
Mary Magdalene	Matthew 27:56,61; 28:1. Mark 15:40,47; 16:1, 16:9*. Luke 8:2, 24:10. John 19:25; 20:1,11,16,18.	14
Mary of Bethany (John 11–12)	John 11:1,2,19,20,28,31,32,45; 12:3	9
Mary (sister of Martha in Luke 10)	Luke 10:39,42	2
Mary of Clopas	John 19:25; Often identified with "the other Mary" or as "Mary the mother of James".	1
Mary, mother of James and Joseph/Joses	Mark 16:1. Luke 24:10 ("Mary the mother of James"); Matthew 27:56 ("Mary the mother of James and Joseph" - Ἰωσὴφ = 'of Joseph'); Mark 15:40 ("Mary the mother of James the younger and of Joses" - Ἰωσῆτος = 'of Joses'); Mark 15:47 ("Mary the mother of Joses" - Ἰωσῆτος = 'of Joses'); Often identified with Mary of Clopas or "the other Mary".	5
"The other Mary"	Matthew 27:61; 28:1. Often identified with Mary of Clopas or as "Mary the mother of James".	2
Mary, mother of John Mark	Acts 12:12	1
Mary of Rome	Romans 16:6	1
Total Marys: 6–9	Total verses: all of the above (49)	Total: 54

=== Identification of the New Testament Marys ===
A common Protestant tradition holds that there are six women named as Mary in the New Testament: Mary, mother of Jesus; Mary Magdalene; Mary of Bethany; Mary mother of James the Younger; Mary mother of John Mark; and Mary of Rome.

Catholic theologian F.P. Dutripon produced a Latin Bible concordance (dedicated to the archbishop of Paris in 1838), in which he identified six people named Maria (Mary) in the Bible: Moses' and Aaron's sister in the Old Testament and five in the New Testament. He equated Mary Magdalene with Mary of Bethany ('sister of Martha and the resurrected Lazarus') as Maria III, and equated Mary the mother of James the Less and Joseph with Mary of Clopas as Maria IV. (Note: Dutripon's list of New Testament Marys (p. 854–5): 1. Maria II. Beata Virgo. Filia Joakim vel Heli et sanctæ Annæ, e tribu Juda, mater Salvatoris Jesu Christi.; 2. Maria III. Maria Magdalene, soror Marthæ et Lazari suscitati.; 3. Maria IV. Jacobi Minoris et Joseph mater, quæ etiam dicitur Maria Cleophæ, scilicet uxor. Hæc erat beatæ Virginis soror, vel, ut alii volunt, soror sancti Joseph sponsi beatæ Virginis. Matth. 27-56,61; 28-1. Marc. 15-40,47. Luc. 24-10. Joan. 19:23.; 4. Maria V. Quænam fuerit hæc Maria non constat. Rom. 16-6.; 5. Maria VI. Mater Joannis qui cognominatus est Marcus. Act. 12-12.)

Some modern scholars state that there are 'six or seven' characters named Mary that can be distinguished in the New Testament. W. Thomas Sawyer (1990) posited that the same Mary, sister of Martha, is mentioned in both Luke 10 and John 11–12, that Mary of Clopas may have been 'the other Mary' as well as the same person as 'Mary the mother James and Joses', and that the other disputed Marys were all to be identified as 'Mary the mother of James the Younger and Joses'; Sawyer rejected the idea that Mary Magdalene was the sinful woman of Luke 7. John Painter (2004) numbered 'six or seven different women', listing 'the mother of Jesus, Mary Magdalene, the mother of Jacob the Small and Joseph, the wife[?] of Clopas, the sister of Martha and Lazarus, the mother of John, and another Mary mentioned by Paul (Rom 16:6);' he gave no indication which two Marys were possibly the same person. W. T. Dayton (2010) identified Mary, sister of Martha in Luke 10 with Mary of Bethany in John 11–12, 'the other Mary' with 'Mary the mother of James the younger and of Joseph/Joses' and speculated but didn't definitively conclude that this was the same person as Mary of Clopas. He rejected the idea that Mary Magdalene was the sinful woman of Luke 7. Raymond E. Brown (1978) pointed out that Jesus had four "brothers" called James, Joses/Joseph, Judas and Simon and noted the similarity to verses Mark 15:40 ('Mary the mother of James the Younger and of Joses') and Matthew 27:56 ('Mary the mother of James and Joseph'). He concluded that the latter two verses may in fact be referring to the mother of Jesus, though she is never identified as such in these verses.

== Mary, mother of Jesus ==
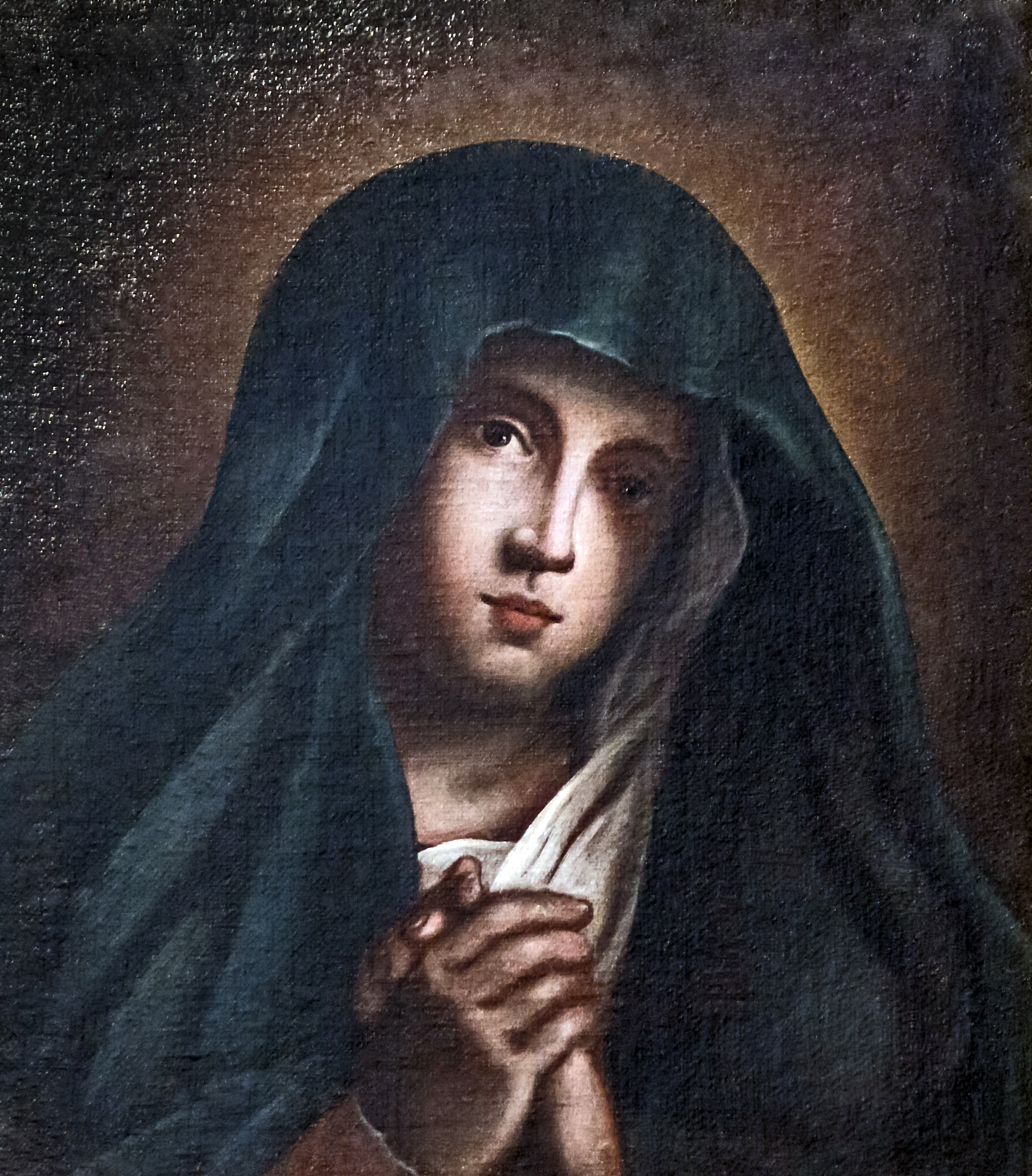
The Madonna in Prayer, by Sassoferrato, 17th century

Mary the mother of Jesus, also known as the Madonna or the Theotokos is the most important female figure in Christianity. The terms Mariology (the academic study of the figure of Mary) and Marian (for example in Marian devotions and Marian apparition) are derived from Mary the mother of Jesus.

She is mentioned by name twelve times in the Gospel of Luke, (Note: Luke 1:27,30,34, 38–39,41,46,56; 2:5,16,19,34.) five times in the Gospel of Matthew, (Note: Matthew 1:16,18,20; 2:11; 13:55.) once in the Gospel of Mark, (Note: Mark 6:3.) and once in the Book of Acts. (Note: Acts 1:14.) This person is never mentioned by name elsewhere, but sometimes it is clear that she is meant by the mother of Jesus. The oldest nameless reference her can be found in Epistle to the Galatians 4:4 '...God sent his son, born of a woman...', by which Paul the Apostle sought to emphasise the humanity of Jesus.

Nearly all of this Mary's mentions by name are within the Nativity of Jesus, which is only told by Matthew and Luke. Mary's role is most prominent in the Gospel of Luke, which provides the only canonical account of the Annunciation, the Visitation, the Presentation of Jesus at the Temple, and the Finding in the Temple. Only two of the Gospel passages that mention his mother by name, Matthew 13:55 and Mark 6:3, are later in Jesus' life, and parallel passages describe the same event. In addition Matthew 12:46–50 and Mark 3:31–35 both describe Mary's visit to Jesus as an adult but without mentioning her name.

The Gospel of John mentions the mother of Jesus twice (John 2:1–12 and 19:25–27) but without naming her, and is the only canonical Gospel to explicitly state that she was present at the Crucifixion.

== Mary Magdalene ==
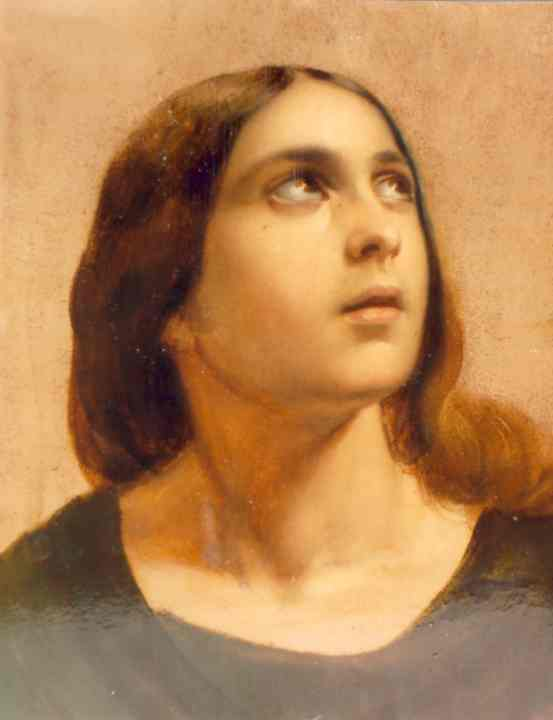
Magdalena by Gheorghe Tattarescu

Mary Magdalene is named 13 times in the Gospels: three times in Matthew (27:56,61; 28:1), three times in Mark (15:40,47; 16:1), twice in Luke (8:2; 24:10), and five times in John (19:25; 20:1,11,16,18). Mark 16:9 was added later; it contains a 14th mention of Mary Magdalene. She is one of the few female followers of Jesus mentioned by name, and in all but one instances where she appears in a group of women she is mentioned first.

Prior to the Crucifixion, the only explicit mention of her is in Luke 8:2, in which she is one of only three named of the many women accompanying Jesus in his travels. Here she is also described as one of the women who had been healed of evil spirits and infirmities, and as the one from whom seven demons had gone out.

Three of the four Gospels mention Mary Magdalene as one of the women who was present at the crucifixion, (Note: Matthew 27:56, Mark 15:40, John 19:25.) while Luke only mentions "the women who followed him from Galilee." (Note: Luke 23:49.) Matthew and Mark mention that she witnessed the burial of Jesus, Luke only mentions 'the women of Galilee' without a name, and John does not mention any women at all. However, all four Gospels report that Mary Magdalene was amongst the women who subsequently found Jesus' tomb empty; John only mentions her. (Note: Matthew 28:1, Mark 16:1, Luke 24:10, John 20:1.)

Several scholars and traditions identify her with other women in the New Testament, but none of these are universally accepted. Roman Catholic tradition, in particular, has from time to time identified her with both Mary of Bethany and with the unnamed woman who was a sinner of Luke 7:37–39, resulting in the view that she is mentioned more times than Mary, the mother of Jesus, in the New Testament, and also giving rise to the legend that made her a model of a penitent sinner and even, according to Pope Gregory, a reformed prostitute. This view, which was taken to its extreme in Legenda Aurea (c. 1260), is no longer affirmed by the Roman Catholic Church and universally rejected by modern New Testament scholars, but remains in popular devotion and culture.

== Mary of Bethany (John 11–12) ==
According to the Gospel of John, this Mary was the sister of Martha and Lazarus, and lived with them in Bethany in Judea near Jerusalem, where Jesus visited them on at least two occasions. Mary and Martha are mentioned by name in John 11:1–12:8. John describes two visits by Jesus to Mary and Martha. In John 11, Jesus raises Mary's brother Lazarus from death. Mary, Martha and Lazarus already appear to be very close friends of Jesus at this time. On a subsequent visit in John 12:1–8, Mary anoints Jesus' feet.

Three other passages, one each in Matthew, Mark and Luke, refer to an unnamed woman who anoints Jesus' head (Mark 14, Matthew 26), or an unnamed sinful woman who anoints Jesus' feet (Luke 7). This woman is, or these women are, identified by some, but by no means all, authorities as this Mary, or as Mary Magdalene, or both. Catholic tradition in particular has identified the sinful woman in Luke with both Mary of Bethany and Mary Magdalene, though in recent decades Catholic theology and liturgy has distanced itself from that identification.

Matthew 26:6–7 and Mark 14:3 are generally agreed to be parallel passages each to the other. An unnamed woman anoints Jesus at Bethany, this time in the house of Simon the Leper, and she anoints his head rather than his feet. Some traditions also assert that this is the same incident as in John 12.

In Luke 7:36–40, Jesus dines at the home of a Pharisee named Simon, but here the locality is not given. As Jesus had just been in Capernaum and Nain, and some time thereafter left Galilee crossing the Sea of Galilee towards Gerasa, this story was most probably also set somewhere in Galilee. A "woman of the city, who was a sinner" anoints his feet, and again her name is not given. Many scholars regard this as the same incident as described in Matthew 26 and Mark 14, again despite some discrepancies. Some authorities identify this person as Mary Magdalene, and some the event as that in John 12, again with some discrepancies. Other scholars insist (and since 1969 the Catholic Church recognises) that these are two separate events and three separate people; Mary Magdalene in particular is never said to anoint Jesus, and appears to have nothing to do with either the sinful woman in Luke 7 or the anointing women of Bethany in Matthew 26, Mark 14 or John 12. Bart D. Ehrman (2006) suggested that the author of Luke deliberately changed the account of Mark 14 in order to appeal to his audience.

According to Luke 8:1–2 Mary Magdalene was known as the person who was delivered of seven demons. The unnamed woman who anointed Jesus came to Simon's house and after that Jesus travelled through the town and around different villages, as said in Luke 8:1, before he met Mary Magdalene.

== Mary (sister of Martha in Luke 10) ==
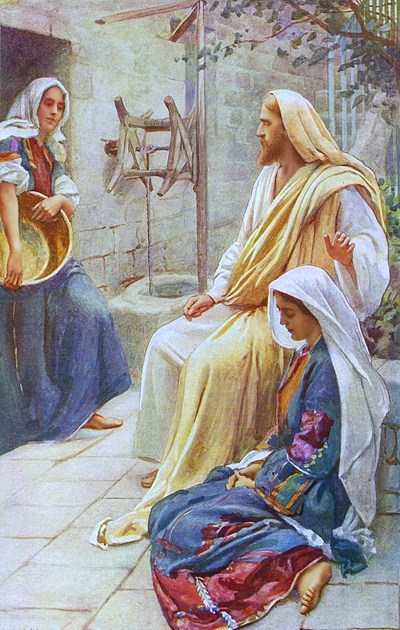
Jesus at the home of Martha and Mary by Harold Copping, depicting the scene from Luke 10

In Luke 10:38–42, Jesus visits two sisters named Mary and Martha in an unnamed village. Although there are several similarities between these Mary and Martha and those in John 11–12, no brother called Lazarus appears. Whether this Mary is also the unnamed woman in Matthew 26 and Mark 14 is not generally agreed. Moreover, scholars generally agree that unnamed sinful woman in Luke 7 is not Mary of Bethany either, and Luke 7 has the sinful woman living in a town (probably Nain), not in an unnamed village as Martha and Mary do in Luke 10. (Note: Luke 7:39 indicates that the sinful woman was living 'in the town/city' (Greek: ἐν τῇ πόλει, en têi pólei) Jesus was staying in; the precending narrative of the Raising of the son of the widow of Nain (7:11–17) locates Jesus in Nain. Luke 7:11–17 labels Nain a polis three times, in verses 7:11 and 7:12. On the other hand, the unnamed place where Mary and Martha live in Luke 10:38–42 is labelled a 'village' (Greek: κώμη, kómè) in verse 10:38. Luke therefore linguistically connects the sinful woman to a city/town, and distinguishes the unnamed home of Mary and Martha as a village.) Luke 10, which appears to be set strictly in Galilee, gives no geographic reason to identify the unnamed village of Martha and Mary with Bethany in Judea.

Due to the parallels with John 11–12, this unnamed village has traditionally often been identified with the Judean village Bethany, for example by Poole (1669), Gill (1748), Benson (1857), Jamieson-Fausset-Brown (1871), Ellicott (1878), Barnes (1884), Farrar (1891), and the Pulpit Commentary (1800s). However, Luke 10 appears to be set strictly in Galilee, and thus gives no geographic reason to identify the unnamed village of Martha and Mary with Bethany in Judea. Meyer's NT Commentary (1880 English edition) noted that "Jesus cannot yet be in Bethany (see Luke 13:22, Luke 17:11), where Martha and Mary dwelt (John 11:1; John 12:1 f.)" but supposed that "Luke, because he was unacquainted with the more detailed circumstances of the persons concerned, transposed this incident, which must have occurred in Bethany, and that on an earlier festal journey, not merely to the last journey, but also to some other village, and that a village of Galilee." Burkitt (1931) stated: 'We have a story [in Lk 10^{37-42}] of a pair of sisters, Martha and Mary, who seem to have lived in Galilee. (...) There is nothing to indicate the place or the time: were it not for what we read in the Fourth Gospel it would surely never have occurred to any one to suppose that the sisters lived just outside Jerusalem.' Unlike Meyer, Burkitt concluded that not the author of Luke, but the author of John had '[made] unhistorical use of tradition already in circulation'. Esler & Piper (2006) distinguished the two villages, based on the Galilean context of the chapter in Luke. They posited that the Gospel of John deliberately mixed up several separate stories from the Synoptic Gospels, namely that of the Markan–Matthean anointing of Jesus (for his upcoming death) by an unnamed woman in Bethany (Mark 14 and Matthew 26), the Lukan Jesus' visit to Martha and Mary in an unnamed village (Luke 10), and the Lukan parable of the rich man and Lazarus (Luke 16). Esler & Piper argued that author did not strive to give a historically accurate account of what had happened, but instead, for theological purposes, combined various existing narratives in order to construct Lazarus, Mary and Martha of Bethany as a prototypical Christian family, whose example is to be followed by Christians.

== Mary of Clopas ==
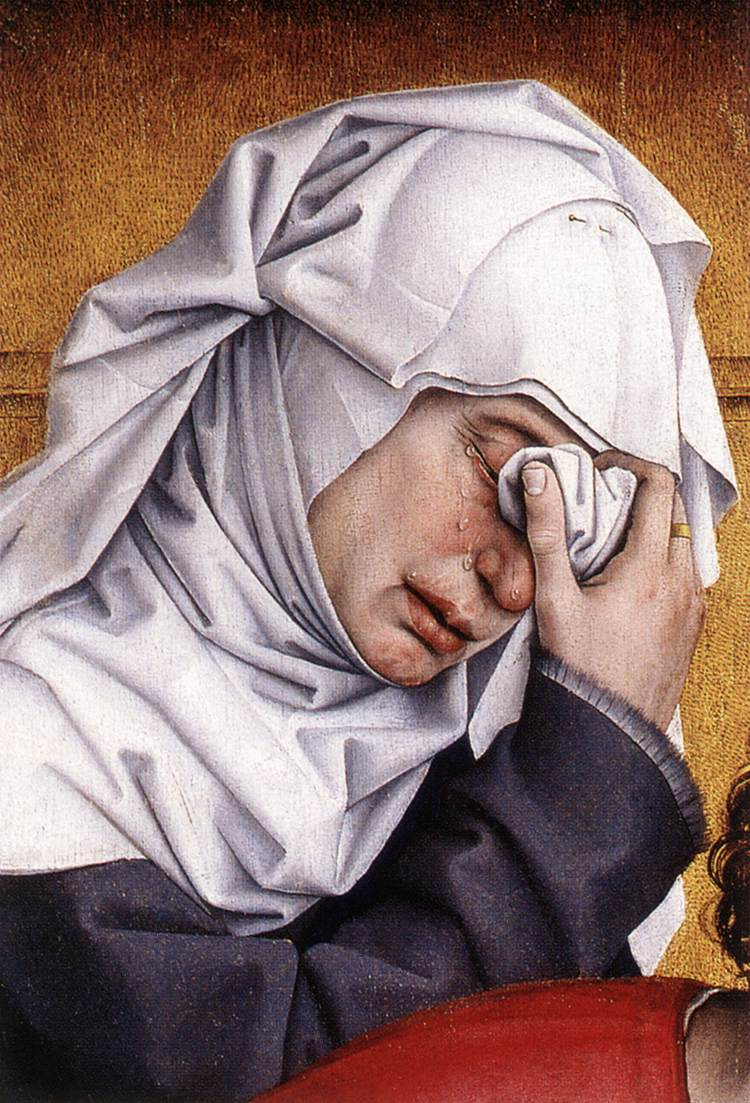
Mary of Clopas in a detail of Rogier van der Weyden's Descent from the Cross, c. 1435 (Museo del Prado)

Mary of Clopas (Greek: Μαρία ἡ τοῦ Κλωπᾶ, which is generally understood as 'Mary, the wife of Clopas' (or, less frequently, 'the daughter of Clopas')), is only mentioned once in the New Testament, namely in John 19:25, where she is listed as one of several women standing by the Cross:

Εἱστήκεισαν δὲ παρὰ τῷ σταυρῷ τοῦ Ἰησοῦ ἡ μήτηρ αὐτοῦ καὶ ἡ ἀδελφὴ τῆς μητρὸς αὐτοῦ, Μαρία ἡ τοῦ Κλωπᾶ καὶ Μαρία ἡ Μαγδαληνή.
- (Note: textual variants differ in how many commas are used, and where they are put).
Near the cross of Jesus stood his mother and the sister of his mother, Mary [the wife] of Clopas and Mary Magdalene.

This passage can be read as there being four women: Mary the mother of Jesus, her sister (or perhaps cousin, the Aramaic words being the same), Mary the wife of Clopas, and Mary Magdalene. An alternative reading is that the list is of only three women, and that Mary of Clopas is also the sister (or cousin) of Mary the mother of Jesus, as some traditions and scholars maintain. Some Bible translations such as the Contemporary English Version and the Catholic Public Domain add the English word "and" between the words "and her sister" and "Mary [the wife] of Clopas", but there is no "and" (Greek: καὶ) in that place in the Greek source text. Most English translations follow the Greek source text and thus enable the reading of three women.

Brown (1978) pointed out that it is even possible to read this verse as having only two women, namely that Mary of Clopas was the mother of Jesus and Mary Magdalene the sister of his mother, but that this would be highly unlikely, since Mary the mother of Jesus was reportedly married to Joseph, not Clopas. However, James Tabor (2006) suggested that Mary of Clopas was the same person as Mary the mother of Jesus, and that Clopas was her second husband, Joseph having died.

Many scholars identify her with the other Mary mentioned twice in Matthew, and also therefore with Mary mother of James (the younger) in the parallel passages in Mark. This is also the Catholic tradition.

Some scholars suggest that Clopas is a variant spelling of Cleopas, and that Mary of Clopas is Cleopas' wife and also the unnamed person who is with him when they meet the risen Christ on the Emmaus Road in Luke 24:13–35. This is a minority view.

== Mary, mother of James and Joseph/Joses ==
There are five passages in the Synoptic Gospels which, in different wordings, refer to a Mary who is the mother of James and of Joseph/Joses. These passages are:

1. "Mary the mother of James" according to Mark 16:1 and Luke 24:10.
2. "Mary the mother of James and Joseph" (Ἰωσὴφ = 'of Joseph') according to Matthew 27:56.
3. "Mary the mother of James the younger/less" (Greek: Ἰακώβου τοῦ μικροῦ) "and of Joses" (Ἰωσῆτος = 'of Joses') according to Mark 15:40.
4. "Mary the mother of Joses" (Ἰωσῆτος = 'of Joses') according to Mark 15:47.

Brown (1978) pointed out the similarities between Mark 6:3 and Matthew 13:55 on the one hand and Mark 15:40 and Matthew 27:56 on the other. He concluded that this Mary was not likely to be identical to Mary the mother of Jesus but stated that scholars disagree as to whether or not it would have been the same James and Joseph/Joses.

== The other Mary ==
Two passages in Matthew (27:61 and 28:1) refer to "Mary Magdalene and the other Mary". Many scholars identify "the other Mary" as Mary of Clopas, or as "Mary the mother of James and Joseph/Joses".

== Mary, mother of John Mark ==
Mary, the mother of John whose other name was Mark is named only once, in Acts 12:12. Because she owned a house in Jerusalem, it is generally assumed that she was a widow, since women were not allowed to own property when married. From the fact that she had a large house where Christians could gather, and also had a maidservant / slave girl (παιδίσκη) named Rhoda (Acts 12:13), it can also be inferred that she was rich and probably a Christian herself.

Nothing further is known about this Mary. It has been conjectured that she is the same person as Mary of Rome (Romans 16:6), but there is no general support for this.

== Mary of Rome ==
In Romans 16:6, Paul asks the recipients to Greet Mary, who has worked hard for you. Nothing else is known about this person.

== People allegedly called Mary ==
Several women in the New Testament have no names, or in fact have a name other than Mary, but have nevertheless been attributed the name Mary by later Christian traditions, either by confusion or by comparative analysis of texts.

=== Head-anointers and sinful woman ===
Alleged locations where women are said to have anointed Jesus in some way

Because of the similarities between the four Gospel accounts of a woman anointing Jesus, Christian tradition has identified one anointing, conducted by a woman called Mary (a name mentioned only in John) at Bethany, a village in Judea mentioned in Matthew, Mark and John, but not in Luke. Although modern scholarship has almost universally agreed that none of these women are to be confused with Mary Magdalene (who therefore was not the 'sinful woman' from Luke 7), and scholars generally agree that Luke 7's sinful woman is also distinct from Mary of Bethany, there is no general agreement yet whether or not the women in Mark 14 and Matthew 26 can be labelled Mary (of Bethany) based on their similarities to John 11–12. Esler & Piper (2006) argued that the author of John merely borrowed the names Mary and Martha from the sisters living in the unnamed village in Luke 10. Finally, the hosts receiving Jesus at their house seem to be four different characters across the stories: Simon the Leper in Mark and Matthew, Simon the Pharisee in Luke 7, Martha in Luke 10, and Lazarus of Bethany in John 11–12.

Anointing of Jesus & Luke 10
Gospel	Setting	Character	What did she do?	Siblings	Host
Mark 14	Bethany, village in Judea	unnamed woman	anointed Jesus' head	none mentioned	Simon the Leper
Matthew 26	Bethany, village in Judea	unnamed woman	anointed Jesus' head	none mentioned	Simon the Leper
Luke 7	city/town in Galilee, probably Nain	unnamed sinful woman	cried on, anointed & hair-dried Jesus' feet	none mentioned	Simon the Pharisee
Luke 10	unnamed village (Note: Due to the parallels with John 11–12, this unnamed village is often identified with the Judean village of Bethany. Esler & Piper however distinguish the two villages, based on the Galilean context of the chapter in Luke. Meyer's NT Commentary notes that "Jesus cannot yet be in Bethany (see Luke 13:22, Luke 17:11), where Martha and Mary dwelt (John 11:1; John 12:1 f.), and hence it is to be supposed that Luke, because he was unacquainted with the more detailed circumstances of the persons concerned, transposed this incident, which must have occurred in Bethany, and that on an earlier festal journey, not merely to the last journey, but also to some other village, and that a village of Galilee.")	Mary	sat at Jesus' feet listening to Jesus	Martha	Martha
John 11–12	Bethany, village in Judea	Mary	anointed & hair-dried Jesus' feet	Martha & Lazarus	Lazarus of Bethany

=== "Mary" Salome ===
The name Salome occurs only twice in the New Testament, both times in the Gospel of Mark (verses 15:40 and 16:1). Because Mark 15:40–41 has "Salome" in place of "the mother of the sons of Zebedee" appearing in the parallel passage, Matthew 27:55–56, Salome is often identified as "the mother of the sons of Zebedee".

Western Christian traditions speaks of "three Marys" at the cross, based on various harmonisations and the tradition that Salome was actually also called 'Mary'. Salome is therefore referred to as 'Mary Salome' in many medieval texts. For example, the Legenda Aurea (written around 1260) mentions 'Mary Cleophae, Mary Salomé and Mary, the mother of Jesus' at the cross, whereas French and Spanish popular devotions recognized 'Mary Magdalene, Mary Cleophae and Mary Salomé', ignoring the mother of Jesus. Most likely, the fact that this way of counting resulted in the number three, symbolic for Christians, stimulated the emergence of the Three Marys tradition.

Losch (2008) speculated that Salome, 'the mother of the sons of Zebedee' and 'the sister of Jesus's mother' are all the same person and thus Salome Jesus's aunt, but emphasised that this was 'not based on hard evidence'. Moreover, Losch noted that 'many scholars reject this relationship', because the formulation makes no sense: if this was what the Bible writers really meant, then they would have written it down differently.

=== Woman taken in adultery ===
Sometimes the woman taken in adultery in the Pericope Adulterae (John 7:53–8:11) is mistakenly presumed to be Mary Magdalene, owing to the other incorrect association of Mary Magdalene with the 'sinful' woman in Luke 7. However, the woman accused of adultery is unnamed, and Mary Magdalene appears nowhere in the Gospel of John until chapter 20.

== See also ==
- Three Marys
- Saint Mary (disambiguation)
- Mary (disambiguation)
- Myrrhbearers
- New Testament people named James
- New Testament people named John
- New Testament people named Joseph
- New Testament people named Judas or Jude
- New Testament people named Simon
