= New Testament people named Simon =

Men named Simon or Simeon in the New Testament

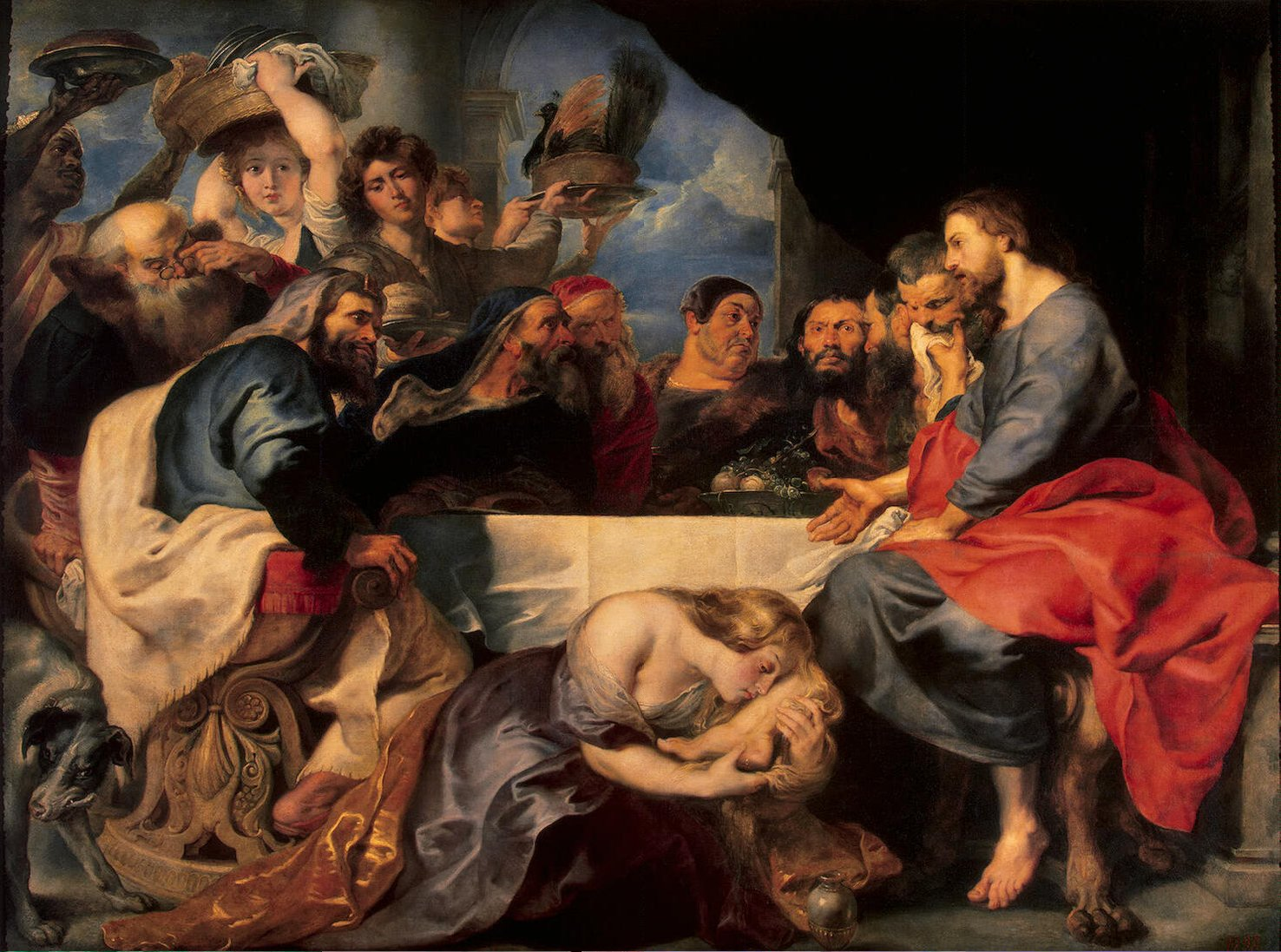
The Feast in the House of Simon the Pharisee by Rubens, c. 1618. Simon the Pharisee is sometimes identified as Simon the Leper.

The names Simon (Greek Σίμων) and Simeon (Greek Συμεών) appear 71 times and 8 times in the New Testament, respectively. Simon (or its variant Simeon) was a very common given name in the historical period and region of Jesus, but surnames were still very rare. It is therefore not always clear which person these names refer to, and whether some refer to the same person or distinct characters, which has led to confusion. Therefore, Christian authors and modern scholars have given these men nicknames based on their known attributes.

F.P. Dutripon's Latin Bible concordance (Paris 1838) identified 14 people named Simon and 5 named Simeon in the Bible, 10 and 3 of whom featured in the New Testament, respectively. (Note: Dutripon's list of New Testament Simeons (p. 1281): 1. Simeon I. Filius secundus Jacob ex Lia (...), Apoc. 7-7.; 2. Simeon IV. Homo in Jerusalem cui nomen Simeon, Luc. 2-35.; 3. Simeon V. Filius Juda, pater Levi, in genealogia Jesu Christi secundum Lucam, Luc. 3-30.; Dutripon's list of New Testament Simons (p. 1283–4): 1. Simon V. Cognomen sancti Petri.; 2. Simon VI. Discipulus Jesi Christi. Vocatur Cananæus [aut] Zelotes.; 3. Simon VII. Frater Jesu Christi, id est, filius Mariæ sororis beatæ Virginis.; 4. Simon VIII. Ex civitate Nahim, Pharisæus.; 5. Simon IX. Cyrenæus appellabatur, quia Cyrene natus.; 6. Simon X. Qui dicitur Leprosus (...). Quidam auctores eumdem faciunt cum Simone Pharisæo.; 7. Simon XI. Pater Judæ proditoris.; 8. Simon XII. (...) dicebatur magus.; 9. Simon XIII. Dictus coriarius.; 10. Simon XIV. Hic dicitur Niger.) Dutch Franciscan Martialis Vreeswijk (1925) argued that Dutripon should have equated Simon, brother of Jesus and Simon the Zealot, as well as Simon the Pharisee and Simon the Leper, resulting in 8 unique New Testament Simons. In Eerdmans Dictionary of the Bible (2000, 2019) Edwin C. Hostetter identified four Simeons and W. Edward Glenny found nine Simons in the New Testament books, counting Sim(e)on Peter twice. John F. MacArthur (2004) stated: '[Besides Simon Peter], there are eight other Simons mentioned in the New Testament (...)', excluding the Simeons. Jennifer Smith (2014) listed 10 possibly unique Sim(e)ons in total.

The following Simons and Simeons can be found in the New Testament:

- Simon Peter, better known as Saint Peter, also known as Peter the Apostle, Cephas, and Simon bar Jonah (Simon son of Jonah), foremost disciple of Jesus (Matthew 4:18ff). The author of 2 Peter also calls himself 'Simon' or 'Simeon Peter', although the true authorship is disputed. Some scholars think 'Simeon' in Acts 15:14 also refers to Simon Peter, connecting the verse to Acts 13:46–47.
- Simon the Zealot, disciple of Jesus (Luke 6:15, Acts 1:13) or Simon the Canaanite (Matthew 10:4, Mark 3:18), also called 'Simon the Patriot' in some translations. Scholars universally accept that Mark and Matthew mistranslated the Aramaic word for "enthusiast" to 'Canaanite', and that Luke's translation 'Zealot' is more likely to be correct.
- Simon, brother of Jesus (Matthew 13:55, Mark 6:3). Some claim Simon was Jesus' 'half brother'. Simeon of Jerusalem might be the same person.
- Simeon (Gospel of Luke), who blessed the baby Jesus during the Presentation of Jesus at the Temple (Luke 2:25–35)
- Simon the Leper, previously miraculously healed by Jesus of leprosy, host of a meal for Jesus in Bethany (Matthew 26:6, Mark 14:3, see Anointing of Jesus)
- Simon the Pharisee, host of a meal for Jesus somewhere in Galilee (Luke 7:36, see Anointing of Jesus). Though some identify him as the same person as Simon the Leper, others stress that they are distinct.
- Simon of Cyrene, random passer-by who is forced to carry Jesus' cross (Matthew 27:32, Mark 15:21, Luke 23:26)
- Simon Magus, Simon the Sorcerer, Simon the Magician, or Simon the Samaritan, disciple of John the Baptist (Acts 8). The word 'simony' is named after him.
- Simon Iscariot, father of Judas Iscariot (John 6:71, 13:2, 13:26)
- Simon the Tanner, a tanner living in Jaffa (Joppa) at whose house Simon Peter stayed as a guest (Acts 9 and 10)
- Simeon Niger ('the Black'), teacher in the Church of Antioch (Acts 13:1). Some have claimed he is the same as Simon of Cyrene on the assumption that 'Niger' means he had a black skin colour and was thus probably an African, and the fact that Cyrene, Libya was also located in Africa, but this argument is largely dismissed by other scholars.
- Simeon (son of Jacob), legendary founder of the Tribe of Simeon (Revelation 7:7)
- Simeon, son of Judah, an otherwise unknown alleged ancestor of Jesus according to Luke 3:30

== See also ==
- New Testament people named James
- New Testament people named John
- New Testament people named Joseph (or Joses)
- New Testament people named Judas or Jude
- New Testament people named Mary
