= New Testament people named Joseph =

Men named Joseph in the New Testament

The name Joseph (Greek Ἰωσὴφ Iōsēph, from Hebrew יוֹסֵף Yosef) appears a number of times in the New Testament. It is not always clear which person these names refer to, and whether some refer to the same person or distinct characters, which has led to confusion. Therefore, Christian authors and modern scholars have given these men names based on their known attributes.

== Textual criticism ==
=== Variations in transcriptions ===
It is uncertain how often the name Joseph appeared in the original Greek New Testament, as textual variants show verses adding, omitting or changing the name Joseph. Joses (Ιωσης) may or may not be the same name as Joseph, and so the number of occurrences also depends on whether they are counted jointly or separately. Strong's Concordance (1890) identified 36 occurrences of the name Joseph (35 times as Ἰωσὴφ, once (in Luke 3:26) as Ἰωσήχ) in the King James Version, a 17th-century English translation based on the Byzantine text-type Textus Receptus. The New American Standard Exhaustive Concordance (1998), which employed a critical literal translation based on the Alexandrian text-type Novum Testamentum Graece (Nestle–Åland 27th edition, 1993), found 35 occurrences, 33 of which were translated as 'Joseph' and two as 'Joseph's'.

There are also some textual variants such as in Matthew 13:55 in which Joseph (Ιωσηφ) has been variously replaced by Jose (Ιωση), Joses (Ιωσης), John (Ιωαννης), or John and Joses (Ιωαννης και Ιωσης), so that it is uncertain what the original text said and thus which person was meant.

Scholars find that many textual variants in the narratives of the Nativity of Jesus (Luke 2 and Matthew 1–2) and the Finding in the Temple (Luke 2:41–52) involve deliberate alterations such as substituting the words 'his father' with 'Joseph', or 'his parents' with 'Joseph and his mother'. Alexander Globe (1980) concluded 'that most of the non-Neutral readings under consideration were introduced to remove inconsistencies between the biblical narratives and abstract doctrinal statements concerning the virginity of Mary.' Two of the most controversial verses are Luke 2:33 and Luke 2:43, where the Alexandrian texts mention his father and mother and his parents, respectively, but the Byzantine texts mention Joseph and his mother, and the Syriac Sinaiticus (a Western text-type representative) changed Luke 2:43 to say his kinfolk, the latter two text-types apparently to avoid implying that Joseph of Nazareth was Jesus's biological father:

Luke 2:33

καὶ ἦν ὁ πατὴρ αὐτοῦ καὶ ἡ μήτηρ θαυμάζοντες (and his father and mother were amazed) – 01, B, D, L, W, 700, Vg, cop. Alexandrian text-type: Westcott and Hort 1881, Westcott and Hort / [NA27 and UBS4 variants], 1864–94, Nestle 1904.
καὶ ἦν ὁ πατὴρ αὐτοῦ καὶ ἡ μήτηρ αὐτοῦ θαυμάζοντες (and his father and his mother were amazed) – Tischendorf 8th Edition
καὶ ἦν Ἰωσὴφ καὶ ἡ μήτηρ αὐτοῦ θαυμάζοντες (and Joseph and his mother were amazed) – A, K, X, Δ, Θ, Π, Ψ, 053, ƒ^{13}, 28, 565, ... it syr^{ph, h, pal(MSS)}, cop^{bo(MSS)}, goth, Dia. Byz: Stephanus Textus Receptus 1550, Scrivener's Textus Receptus 1894, RP Byzantine Majority Text 2005, Greek Orthodox Church.

Luke 2:43

οὐκ ἔγνωσαν οἱ γονεῖς αὐτοῦ. (his parents didn't know it.) – Alexandrian text-type. 01, B, D, L, W, θ
οὐκ ἔγνω Ἰωσὴφ καὶ ἡ μήτηρ αὐτοῦ· (Joseph and his mother didn't know it.) – Byz. A, C, Ψ, 0130, ƒ^{13}, it, syr^{p, h}, cop^{bo(MSS)} E, Π, 565
(his kinfolk didn't know it.) – syr^{s}

=== Variations in translations ===
Some Bible translations transliterate the name Ιωσηφ depending on the context for better distinction, such as the 2004 Dutch Nieuwe Bijbelvertaling, which writes Jozef wherever Saint Joseph of Nazareth or Joseph (Genesis) are identified (24 verses), and Josef wherever other persons are concerned (14 verses); additionally, three verses in Mark (6:3, 15:40, 15:47) identify a Joses.

== List ==
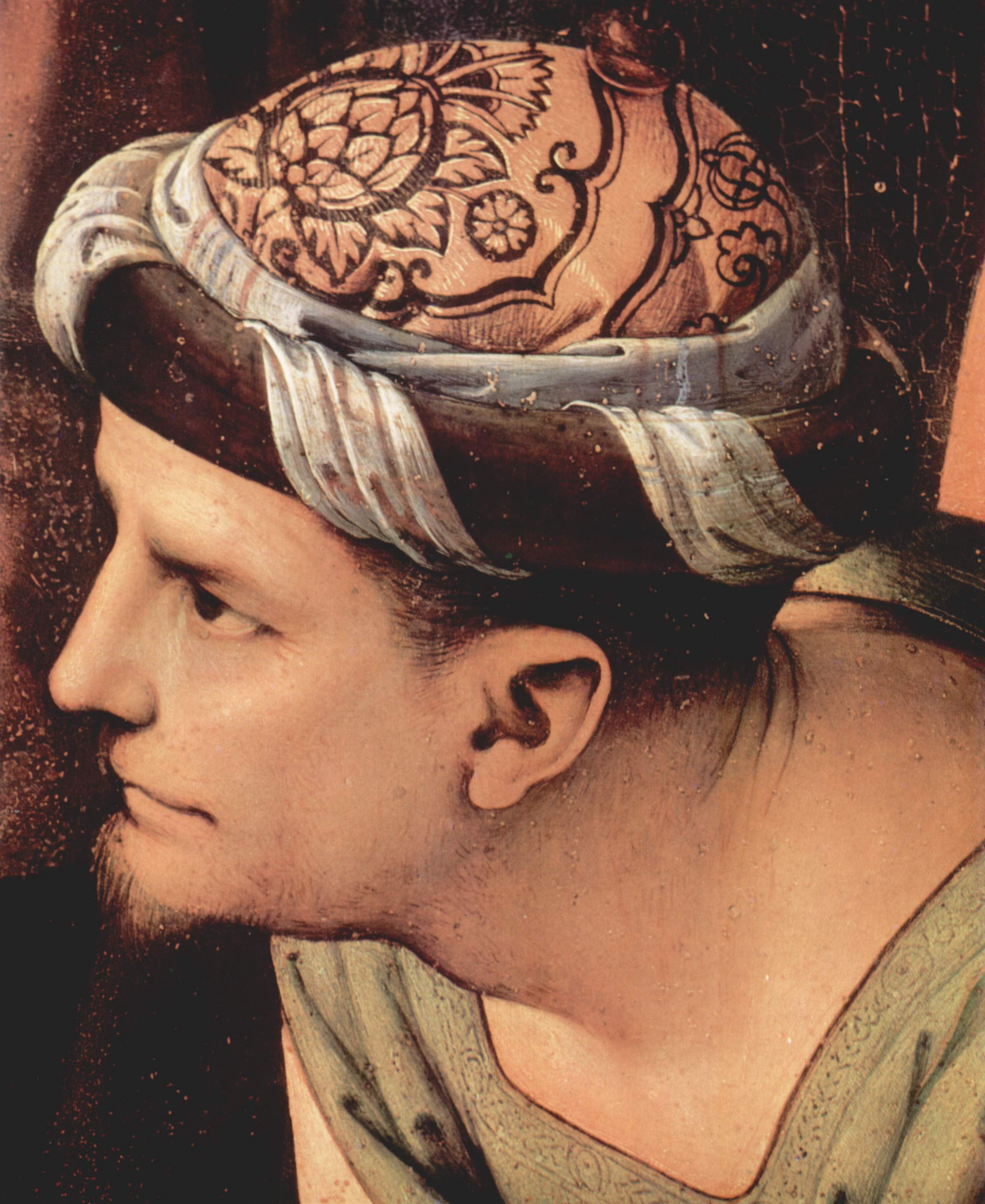
Joseph of Arimathea by Pietro Perugino, a detail from his Lamentation over the Dead Christ (1495).

F.P. Dutripon's Latin Bible concordance (Paris 1838) identified 16 people named Joseph in the Bible, 9 of whom featured in the New Testament: (Note: Dutripon's list of New Testament Josephs (p. 749–50): 1. Joseph I. Undecimus filius Jacob ex Rachel uxore, fraterque Benjamin. Natus est Joseph in Mesopotamia apud Laban. (...) Joan. 4:5; Act. 7:9,13,14,18; Hebr. 11:21,22; Apoc. 7:8.; 2. Joseph VII. Sanctus Joseph, sponsus beatæ Virginis Mariæ, matris Jesu Christi.; 3. Joseph VIII. Pater Janne, et filius Mathathiæ. Luc. 3:24.; 4. Joseph IX. Pater Semei, filius Juda. Luc. 3:26.; 5. Joseph X. Pater Juda, filiusque Jona. Luc. 3:30.; 6. Joseph XI. Filius Mariæ, uxoris Cleophæ; frater sancti Jacobi Minoris, cognatusque Jesu Christi, siquidem mater ejus beatæ Virginis erat soror; vet ut alii putant, soror Joseph sponsi beatæ Virginis. Matth. 13:55, 27:56; Marc. 6:3, 15:40,47.; 7. Joseph XII. Ab Arimathæa, civitate tribus Juda. (...) Matth. 27:57,59; Marc. 15:43,45,46; Luc. 23:50; Joan. 19:38.; 8. Joseph XIII. Vocabatur iste Barsabas, qui cognominatus est Justus. (...) Act. 1:23.; 9. Joseph XIV. Qui cognominatus est Barnabas ab Apostolis, Judæus religione et gente, Cyprius autem habitatione et genere. (...) Act. 4:36.)

1. Joseph I. Joseph (Genesis). Eleventh son of the patriarch Jacob from his wife Rachel, and the brother of Benjamin. This Joseph was born at Laban's place in Mesopotamia. (...) Referenced in John 4:5; Acts 7:9,13,14,18; Hebrews 11:21,22; Revelation 7:8.
2. Joseph VII. Saint Joseph or Joseph of Nazareth, the bridegroom/husband of Mary, mother of Jesus. He is never quoted, is only mentioned by name in the Nativity of Jesus narratives in Matthew and Luke, and only mentioned in passing in John 1:45 and 6:42 where Jesus is called the 'son of Joseph'. Mark nor any of the other New Testament books ever mention him.
3. Joseph VIII. Father of Jannai, son of Mattathias. Luke 3:24.
4. Joseph IX (or Josek). Father of Semein, son of Joda. Luke 3:26.
5. Joseph X. Father of Judah, son of Jonam. Luke 3:30.
6. Joseph XI. Son of Mary of Clopas; brother of Saint James the Less, and a relative of Jesus, because his mother was the sister of Mary, mother of Jesus; others think Joseph XI's mother Mary was the sister of Joseph, the bridegroom/husband of Mary, mother of Jesus. Matthew 13:55, 27:56; Mark 6:3, 15:40,47. Dutripon is thus amongst the group of scholars who equate Mary of Clopas (mentioned only in John 19:25) with "Mary the mother of James and Joseph/Joses" because of the similarities between John 19:25, Matthew 27:56, and Mark 15:40, all of whom describe women at the crucifixion.
7. Joseph XII. Joseph of Arimathea. Matthew 27:57, 59; Mark 15:43,45,46; Luke 23:50; John 19:38. He is only briefly mentioned in all four Gospels after the death of Jesus. Mark 15:43 states that Joseph was 'a prominent member of the Council', which either means the town council of Arimathea or (more likely) the Sanhedrin.
8. Joseph XIII. Joseph Barsabbas, also known as Justus. Acts 1:23.
9. Joseph XIV. Barnabas, birth name Joseph, a Cypriot Jew who became an early Christian apostle. Acts 4:36. A number of textual variants claim that Barnabas's real name was not Joseph (Ἰωσὴφ), but Joses (Ἰωσὴς); this rendering is followed by Stephanus Textus Receptus 1550, Scrivener's Textus Receptus 1894, RP Byzantine Majority Text 2005, and the Greek Orthodox Church. Most modern English Bible translations such as the New International Version (1978) render it as Joseph, a minority including the King James Version (1611) as Joses.

== See also ==
- Joses
- New Testament people named James
- New Testament people named Judas or Jude
- New Testament people named John
- New Testament people named Mary
- New Testament people named Simon
