= New Testament people named John =

The name John (in Greek, Ἰωάννης) is prominent in the New Testament and occurs numerous times. Among Jews of this period, the name was one of the most popular, borne by about five percent of men. Thus, it has long been debated which Johns are to be identified with which.

== Mentioned in narrative ==
At least five unique Johns are mentioned in the texts of New Testament itself. For example, F.P. Dutripon's Latin Bible concordance (Paris 1838) identified 10 people named Joannes (John) in the Bible, 5 of whom featured in the New Testament: (Note: Dutripon's list of New Testament Johns (p. 740–2): 1. Joannes VI. Qui dicitur Baptista. Filius Zachariæ et Elisabeth uxoris ejus, cognatæ beatæ Virgini Mariæ.; 2. Joannes VII. Apostolus et Evangelista, dilectus Christo Discipulus, e Bethsaida oriandus. Filius fuit Zebedæi et Salomes, frater Jacobi apostoli quem Herodes post passionem Christi decolavit. (...) Communis tamen et verior sententia est Joannem obiisse Ephesi anno actatis suæ nongagesimo nono, post vero passionem Jesu Christi sexagesimo octavo.; 3. Joannes VIII. Qui et dicitur Jona. Bar-Jona dictum est Petro a Jesu Christo per contractionem, pro Bar-Johanna, quod Chaldaice, filium Joannis significat, quemadmodum in sequentiobus versiculis, Simon Joannis, id est, Simon filius Jannis. Joan. 21:15-17.; 4. Joannes IX. Qui cognominatus est Marcus; non autem Marcus Evangelista, sed alius qui fuit socius peregrinationis sancti Pauli et Barnabæ. Act. 12:12,25; 13:5,13; 15:37.; 5. Joannes X. Hic unus fuit ex quinque Annæ filiis, alio nomine Jonathas appelatus. Act. 4:6.)

1. John the Baptist
2. John the Apostle, son of Zebedee, whom Dutripon equated with John the Evangelist, John of Patmos, John the Presbyter, the Beloved Disciple and John of Ephesus
3. John, father of Simon Peter
4. John Mark, whom Dutripon distinguishes from Mark the Evangelist
5. John, son of Annas (Acts 4:6)

=== John, father of Simon Peter ===
Simon Peter is at times called "Simon, son of John", though in Matthew the text has Simon Bariona. The latter appears to be untranslated Aramaic, with bar meaning "son of" and Iona being Jonah, or according to Bauckham, Jôhana', an Aramaized form of John.

=== John the Baptist ===
John the Baptist, son of Zechariah, figures prominently in the beginning of each of the four Gospels. The Synoptic Gospels distinguish him as "the Baptist", but the Gospel of John omits this epithet, as no other John is therein mentioned by name. John the Baptist was beheaded during the ministry of Jesus, so in most cases he is easily distinguished from other Johns.

Ford proposes that Revelation originated as prophecy of John the Baptist, expanded by his followers to produce the book in its current form, but most scholars reject this theory.

=== John the Apostle ===
John, son of Zebedee was one of the Twelve Apostles, along with his brother James. This John is mentioned frequently in the Synoptic Gospels, but always (with a lone exception) in company with his brother James or with Peter or often with both.

In the first eight chapters of Acts, Peter is always accompanied by a certain John, who is almost certainly his fellow apostle, and is presumably also the John that Paul elsewhere lists with Peter and James as "pillars". But after the execution of his brother James in 44, this John is never again mentioned.

There are many early indications that James and John were killed together. The response of Jesus to these two, "The cup that I drink you shall drink; and you shall be baptized with the baptism with which I am baptized," has been understood since antiquity as foretelling their martyrdom. Indeed, Papias (c. 100) records that James and John "were killed by the Jews", and early martyrologies record the martyrdom of "John and James the apostles in Jerusalem".

=== John of the high-priestly family ===
This John is mentioned once in passing as present during the trial of Peter and John in Jerusalem, as recorded in Acts: "On the next day, their rulers, elders, and experts in the law came together in Jerusalem. Annas the high priest was there, and Caiaphas, John, Alexander, and others who were members of the high priest's family." Thus, he is probably distinct from John the Apostle, although some scholars (including the 5th Century writer Nonnus, as well as the Gospel of the Nazarenes) have suggested that the Zebedees' fishing business made them known to the high priest, while others conclude that being fishermen (owning multiple boats) is not synonymous with being poor nor precludes priestly connections, and some argue that the other disciple who was known to the high priest and who spoke to the servant-girl on duty there and brought Peter in mentioned in John 18:15 is likely to be the same disciple who is never mentioned by name in John's Gospel. However, the Sons of Zebedee are both present in chapter 21 in the count of five plus two (where seven is the 'complete' number) unnamed disciples. The Beloved Disciple is named as such separately; the other is likely Andrew, which would be the reverse of the first followers identified in John 1:35.

Polycrates of Ephesus (c. 190) writes that John the Evangelist "was a priest, wearing the petalon"—i.e., specifically that he had served as High Priest. In this, he seems to identify the Evangelist with this high-priestly John mentioned in Acts. Some modern scholars make the same identification, further citing from the Gospel "the other disciple, who was known to the High Priest."

Although there is no conclusive proof, and early writings such as by Polycrates may be interpretations based on their reading of the gospels, there are many theories - as one example: given that Elizabeth, Mary's kinswoman, was a "Daughter of Aaron" (and so had priestly connections), so too would Mary's sister mentioned in John 19:25... and she is mentioned in a way, some suggest, that might indicate she is John's mother.

=== John Mark ===
"John, called Mark" is mentioned several times in Acts. Such use of one Semitic name and another Greek name was a common practice among Jews of the time. He is usually identified with the Mark mentioned in various epistles. Some traditions and scholars also equate him with Mark the Evangelist, but others such as Dutripon (1838) reject this identification.

This John is occasionally proposed as author of some of the Johannine works as well. Tarazi (2004) even goes so far as to attribute to him the Gospels of both Mark and John and all the other Johannine books.

== Johannine literature ==
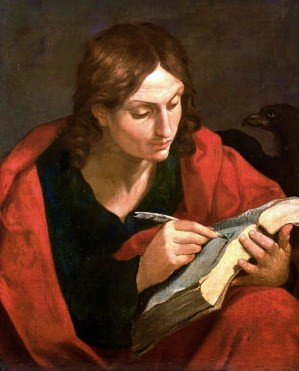
Guido Reni, St. John the Evangelist, 17th century.

Five canonical books of the New Testament are ascribed to John and thus called collectively the Johannine literature:

- The Gospel of John
- The First Epistle of John
- The Second Epistle of John
- The Third Epistle of John
- The Book of Revelation

Only in Revelation does the text itself name its author as John; the other Johannine works are ascribed to John only through their attached titles and other external references.

Whether or not these attributions have a basis in historical truth—modern scholars vary widely in their opinions about authorship—the question remains of which John each of these attributions refers to. Since antiquity, many have considered the entire Johannine corpus to be the work of a single author, a certain John of Ephesus, whom many identified with the Apostle John, son of Zebedee. On the other hand, this identification and the authorship of individual works have also been disputed since antiquity. Thus, the reputed authors of the Johannine works are conventionally called more explicitly—without prejudice to the issues of actual authorship and of their mutual identification—as follows.

=== John the Evangelist ===
The author of the Gospel has traditionally been termed John the Evangelist.

In the Gospel, the name John occurs exclusively in reference to John the Baptist or to the father of Simon Peter, and without that epithet, though "the sons of Zebedee" (named James and John in the Synoptics) are also mentioned once. The Gospel even lacks a list of the Twelve Apostles.

The anonymous "disciple whom Jesus loved" is identified in the closing verses as the one whose testimony the Gospel bears: "This is the disciple who testifies about these things and has written these things." Ancient sources invariably identify this disciple with the Evangelist, and many modern scholars agree, though others consider that John the Evangelist fashioned the testimony of the Beloved Disciple into a Gospel, as Mark did for Peter, or hold on other grounds that the two are not identical.

Further identification of the Beloved Disciple and/or the Evangelist with John the Apostle has been variously defended and impugned.

Some scholars see the Gospel's "and we know that his testimony is true," as indicating a second hand, of a hypothetical redactor or some group of elders certifying the work. Bauckham, however, argues that this is simply the "we of authoritative testimony" of the author himself, used also in the Epistles.

As was an ordinary practice of the time, the Evangelist may have employed an amanuensis. Apocryphal sources of about the 5th century variously name Prochorus, Timothy, or even Papias, and modern scholars have suggested others.

=== John the Presbyter ===
The short second and third epistles are addressed "From the Elder". On this basis, the author is termed John the Elder or John the Presbyter (presbyter being Greek for elder).

Papias (c. 100) refers to a certain "John the Elder, a disciple of the Lord", one of the "elders" he had listened to, and from whose sayings he drew in his five-book Exegesis, now lost. Papias goes on to refer to him simply as "the Elder". Most see Papias as referring to the same John, at least, who penned the epistles.

In later centuries, some saw the address from "the Elder" in the second and third epistles as possibly indicating a different author than the other Johannine works, which cast doubt on their apostolic authority and therefore on their canonicity.

=== John of Patmos ===
Patmos and the seven churches of Asia.

The author of the Book of Revelation (also known as the Apocalypse of John) is variously termed John of Patmos, John the Revelator, John the Divine, or John the Theologian.

The text of Revelation identifies its author thus: "I, John, your brother and the one who shares with you in the persecution, kingdom, and endurance that are in Jesus, was on the island called Patmos because of the word of God and the testimony about Jesus." Patmos was an island near Ephesus, and Revelation begins with letters addressed to the seven churches of Asia, which were Ephesus and other nearby cities.

Dionysius of Alexandria (c. 250) closely criticized Revelation and concluded that it was starkly different from the Gospel and First Epistle (which Dionysius regarded as both the work of John the Apostle) in grammar, style, content, and anonymity, and thus could hardly be the work of the same author, but must have been written by another John, for "there are two monuments in Ephesus, each bearing the name of John." Many modern scholars have concurred with this analysis, but others find striking similarities on closer inspection and attribute the stylistic differences to the Evangelist's use of an amanuensis.

The ancient scholars who accepted Revelation as authentic, however, invariably identified its author as John the Evangelist. Our earliest and most reliable informant is Irenaeus (c. 180), who knew John's personal disciples while in Smyrna. Irenaeus firmly identifies the Revelator with the Evangelist and tells us that he remained with the Church in Ephesus until the time of Trajan (98–117). The Revelator was still publicly active until the close of Domitian's reign (81–96), as Irenaeus says:

For if it were necessary that the Antichrist's name should be distinctly revealed in this present time, it would have been announced by him who beheld the apocalyptic vision. For he [or it?] was seen no very long time since, but almost in our day, towards the end of Domitian's reign.

From Irenaeus' ambiguous syntax, some later writers inferred that the exile to Patmos occurred under Domitian, though others explicitly ascribed it to Nero (54–68); modern scholars still debate which is more likely.

Clement of Alexandria, a contemporary of Irenaeus, tells an anecdote of John and the young robber captain, which opens with:

When, on the tyrant's death, he returned to Ephesus from the isle of Patmos, he went away, being invited, to the contiguous territories of the nations, here to appoint bishops, there to set in order whole Churches, there to ordain such as were marked out by the Spirit.

So again the Revelator is identified with the Bishop of Ephesus, about whom ancient sources have much to say.

== John of Ephesus ==
Patristic sources from as early as the 2nd century widely attest to a certain John, a disciple of Jesus, who lived to old age in Ephesus, and to whom all the Johannine works are ascribed.

The Catholic and Eastern Orthodox traditions are consistent in upholding the John's identity, authorship (of at least the Gospel of John and the first Epistle) and relation to Christ; he is Saint John the Apostle. Outside those traditions, however, whether such a man existed, which works he wrote, whether this figure has been confused or conflated with a second John, and whether he is identical with John son of Zebedee or any other John in the New Testament are all matters of intense controversy.

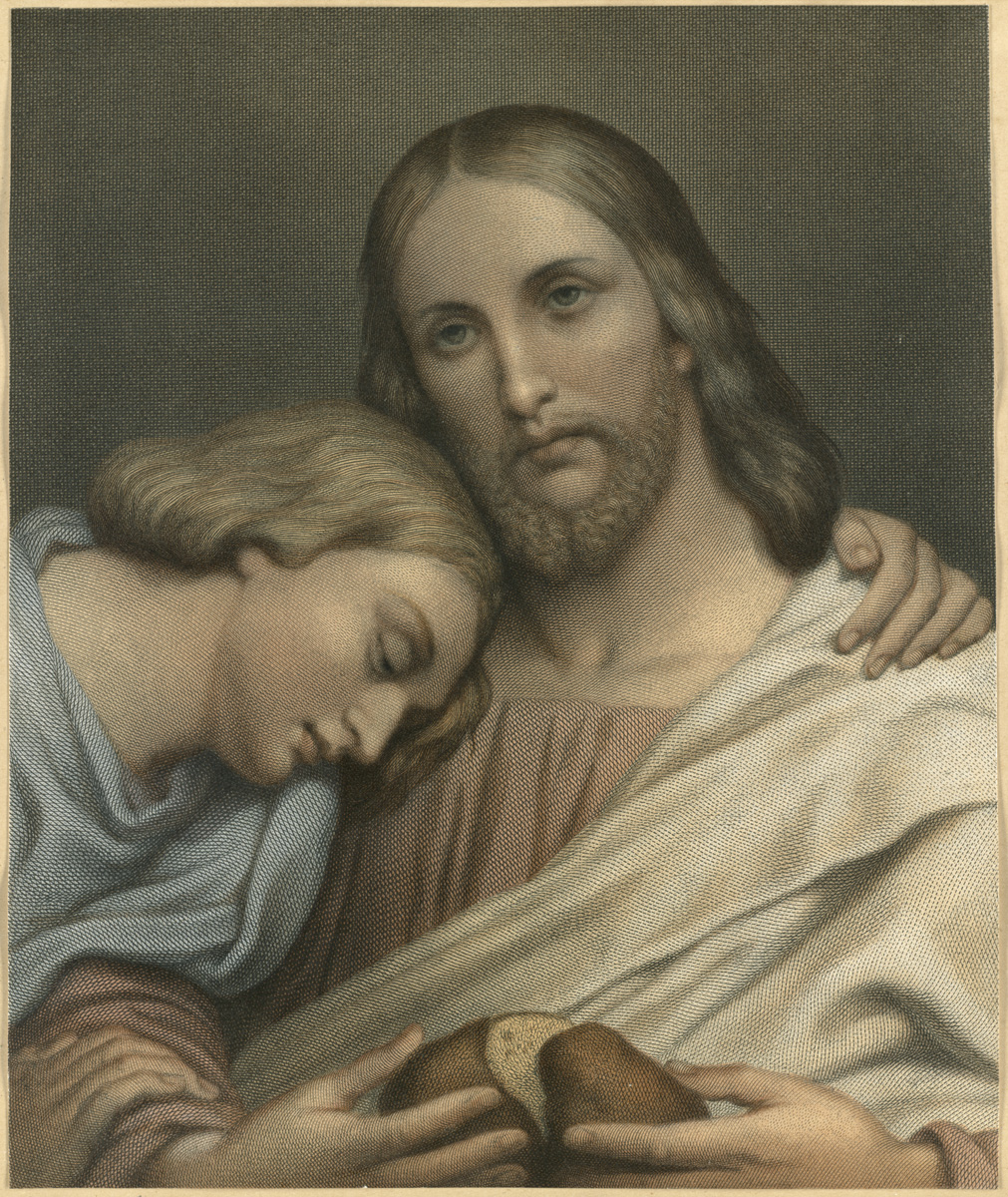
Ary Scheffer, Christ and St. John, 19th century

Irenaeus (c. 180), who cites from Papias and "the elders" and also personally knew Polycarp of Smyrna, another disciple of John of Ephesus, is widely considered the most reliable authority we have on this John. In our first extant description of all four Gospels, Irenaeus concludes:

Finally John, the disciple of the Lord, who had lain on his breast, himself also published a Gospel, while he was residing at Ephesus of Asia.

Here, John the Evangelist is clearly identified with the Beloved Disciple and located in Ephesus. Elsewhere Irenaeus unmistakably cites this same John as author of the Epistles and Revelation as well. Irenaeus also speaks of the aged John surviving in Ephesus until the time of Trajan (98–117), which would be about 70 years after the Crucifixion.

Polycrates of Ephesus (c. 190) is another especially respected source on John, writing of his own relative and predecessor (following the Philip the Apostle):

There is John also, he who leaned back on the Lord's breast, who was a priest wearing the petalon, both witness and teacher. He has fallen asleep at Ephesus.

Polycrates is in accord with Irenaeus, but seems to additionally identify John with the high-priestly John in Acts.

The earliest evidence on the identity of this John is from Papias of Hierapolis, a "hearer of John" writing c. 100, whose work survives only in fragments quoted by others. Papias writes:

And if by chance anyone who had been in attendance on the elders should come my way, I inquired about the words of the elders—what Andrew or Peter had said, or Philip, or Thomas or James, or John or Matthew or any other of the Lord's disciples, and whatever Aristion and the elder John, the Lord's disciples, were saying.

So, Papias refers first to John the Apostle, listed with his brother and others of the Twelve, whose words the elders had handed down to him, and then to John the Elder, another disciple of Jesus, who was himself still being heard. Though some have interpreted these as two references to the same John, Bauckham argues that Papias is clearly distinguishing them. Papias then goes on to cite "the Elder" (just as the Second and Third Epistles are addressed from) on the origins of the Gospels of Mark and Matthew at least, and also to cite from the First Epistle and Revelation.

Papias' account of the origin of the Gospel of John is apparently paraphrased and expanded by Eusebius and is most likely the source for the Muratorian Canon (c. 170) when it says:

The fourth of the gospels is of John, one of the disciples. To his fellow-disciples and bishops, who were encouraging him, he said: "Fast with me today for three days, and whatever will be revealed to each of us, let us tell to one another." The same night it was revealed to Andrew, one of the apostles, that all should certify what John wrote in his own name.... Why, then, is it remarkable that John so constantly brings forth single points even in his epistles, saying of himself, "What we have seen with our eyes and heard with our ears and our hands have handled, these we write to you"? Thus he professes himself not only an eyewitness and hearer but also a writer of all the miracles of our Lord in order.

The Acts of John, an apocryphal Gnostic work thought to have been composed around the late 2nd century, paints a rich, full narrative about John that was profoundly influential on later sources. Here we find the first explicit identification with the son of Zebedee, the story of the attempted execution by boiling oil also reported by Tertullian, the manner of John's natural death, and a great deal more. From the 3rd century onward, legends about John abound, with little hope of untangling any truth from the fiction.

It is clear that John of Ephesus was regarded from the earliest times as a personal disciple of Jesus and a crucial witness to his life, an author of scripture, an apostle, and a great leader among the churches of Asia; whether he was also the son of Zebedee, one of the Twelve Apostles, is much more doubtful. No such identification is explicit in the early sources, apart from the clearly apocryphal, until the middle of the 3rd century. At most, John of Ephesus is occasionally called apostle, but in those cases the term is certainly not confined to the Twelve, and when mentioned with one of the Twelve Apostles, the Evangelist is in fact usually called a disciple by contrast. Bauckham argues that Papias distinguishes them and that the words of Polycrates even preclude such identification, and echos of this distinction linger in a few later sources. Among the orthodox, Origen is the first to explicitly accept the identification, which requires him to reconcile the tradition of John's natural death with the prophecy of John's martyrdom by seeing the latter fulfilled in his temporary exile to Patmos. On the other hand, after this point the identification was almost universally accepted in antiquity.

On whether or not John of Ephesus is to be identified with any of the Johns in the New Testament narrative—the son of Zebedee, the high-priestly John, or even John Mark—modern scholars remain divided.

== See also ==
- New Testament people named James
- New Testament people named Joseph (or Joses)
- New Testament people named Judas or Jude
- New Testament people named Mary
- New Testament people named Simon
