= New Testament people named James =

The name James (from Ancient Greek Ἰάκωβος (Iákōbos); Hebrew יַעֲקֹב (Yaʿăqōḇ)) appears 42 times in the New Testament. James was a very common given name in the historical period and region of Jesus, but surnames were still very rare. It is therefore not always clear which person these names refer to, and whether some refer to the same person or distinct characters, which has led to confusion. Therefore, Christian authors and modern scholars have given these men names based on their known attributes. According to American theologian and scholar Donald Hagner (2012), there are at least 5, and possibly up to 7, different Jameses in the New Testament.

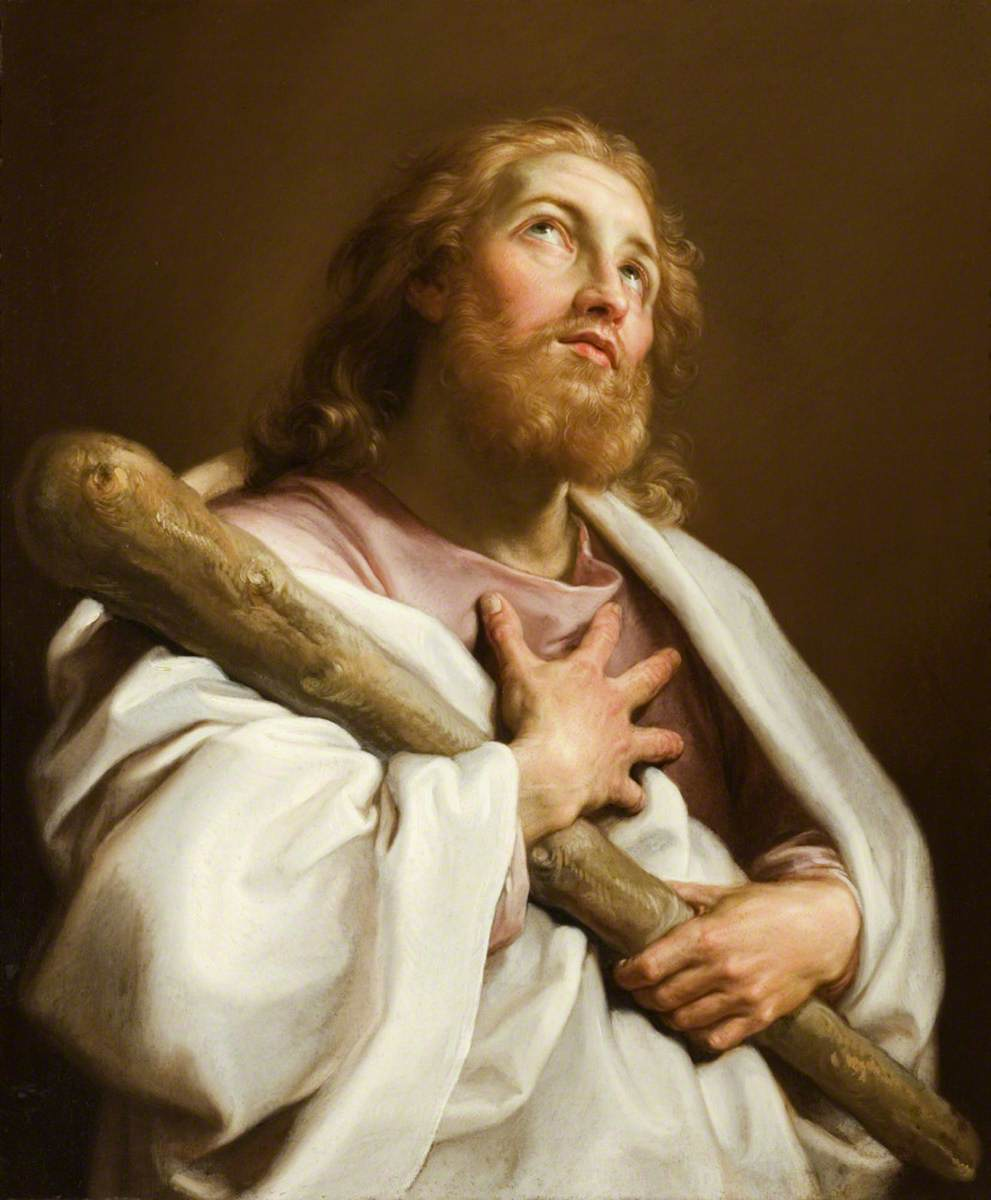
James the Less (by Batoni, c. 1740). It is disputed whether he is to be identified with James, son of Alphaeus, or James, brother of Jesus.

The following Jameses are found in the New Testament:

- James the Great, son of Zebedee, brother of John the Apostle. One of the Twelve Disciples of Jesus, together with his brother John and Simon Peter part of the inner circle of Jesus.
- James, son of Alphaeus. One of the Twelve Disciples of Jesus, but almost nothing is known about him.
- James, brother of Jesus. Also called James the Just. The New Testament calls him 'James, brother of the Lord' in Galatians 1:19. Note: along with a church expression 'James, brother of God' (Ἰάκωβος ὁ Ἀδελφόθεος), disputes have arisen on whether or not James was an actual biological brother of Jesus. Roman Catholics and other Christian theologians attempting to maintain the dogma of the perpetual virginity of Mary argue that it is impossible that Jesus had a biological brother, and that the term 'brother' simply meant cousin or some other close male relative.
- James the Less (Ἰάκωβος ὁ μίκρος, Mark 15:40), son of Mary, mother of James, brother of Joses. It's unclear whether he is to be identified as James, son of Alphaeus, or James, brother of Jesus. Also called James the Lesser.
- James, the father of Jude the Apostle (also called Jude Thaddeus, Jude of James), mentioned in Luke 6:16 and Acts 1:13.
- James, the brother of Jude (the otherwise unknown author of the Epistle of Jude) mentioned in Jude 1:1. Scholars generally agree that this Jude, brother of James (ἀδελφὸς δὲ Ἰακώβου, Jude 1:1) is someone else than Jude the Apostle, son of James (Ἰaκώβου, Luke 6:16; Acts 1:13). Scholars such as Frederick W. Norris (2013) have suggested that this James was 'perhaps a brother of Jesus', but have pointed out that this Jude wrote in learned Greek, spoke of the apostles in the third person and past tense (Jude 1:17), and the fact that some commentators consider the Epistle of Jude to be pseudonymous – casting doubt on the author's purported connections between himself, Jesus and this James. Opoku-Gyamfi (2019) concluded that this James was James, brother of Jesus (whom he calls 'James the elder'), one of the leaders in the early Christian church in Jerusalem as described in Acts 15, that this Jude should not be identified as Jude, brother of Jesus, but as Judas Barsabbas also mentioned in Acts 15, and that the phrase ἀδελφὸς δὲ Ἰακώβου in Jude 1:1 should not be taken as James and Jude being biological brothers, but brothers in the Christian faith.

F.P. Dutripon's Latin Bible concordance (Paris 1838) identified just 2 people named Jacobus (James) in the New Testament: Jacobus I was identified as the apostle James, son of Zebedee. Jacobus II was identified as being simultaneously the apostle James the son of Alphaeus; James the Just; James the Less (Mark 15:40), son of Mary (mother of James and Joseph (Matthew 27:56; Mark 16:1; Luke 24:10) and sister of the Holy Virgin Mary (Mark 6:3)); James the first bishop of Jerusalem; the author of the Epistle of James; James the brother of Jesus (Matthew 13:55; Mark 6:3)); James, the father of Jude (Luke 16:6); the James mentioned in Acts 12:17, 15:13, 21:18, 1 Corinthians 15:7, Galatians 1:19, 2:9,12; and the James, brother of Jude mentioned in Jude 1:1.

== See also ==
- New Testament people named John
- New Testament people named Judas or Jude
- New Testament people named Joseph (or Joses)
- New Testament people named Mary
- New Testament people named Simon
