= New Testament people named Judas or Jude =

Men named Judas or Jude in the New Testament

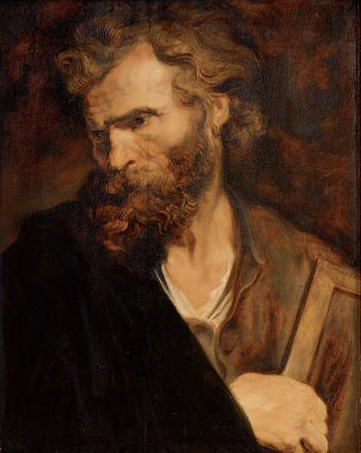
Apostel Judas Thaddeüs by Anthony van Dyck c. 1620. He is called Jude the Apostle in English, or 'Judas (not Iscariot)' by John 14:22, in order to distinguish him from Judas Iscariot.

The names Judas and Jude, both derived from the Greek Ἰούδας (Ioúdas), itself derived from the Hebrew name Judah (יהודה, Y^{e}hûdâh, Hebrew for "God is praised") together appear 36 times in the New Testament. Judas was a very common given name in the historical period and region of Jesus, due to the renowned hero Judas Maccabeus. As surnames were still very rare, it is therefore not always clear which person these names refer to, and whether some refer to the same person or distinct characters, which has led to confusion. Therefore, Christian authors and modern scholars have given these men names based on their known attributes. 'Judas' is sometimes rendered as 'Jude' in English in order to help distinguish some of the people named Ἰούδας in the New Testament, even though the original Greek texts make no such distinction.

The following Judases or Judes are found in the New Testament:

- Judas Iscariot, son of Simon Iscariot. One of the Twelve Disciples of Jesus, who hands over (or 'betrays') Jesus to the Jewish authorities.
- Jude the Apostle, son of James (also called Jude Thaddeus, Judas Thaddaeus, or Jude of James). One of the Twelve Disciples of Jesus. John 14:22 explicitly distinguishes him from the apostle above: 'Judas (not Iscariot)'.
- Jude, brother of Jesus (or Judas or Judah) according to Mark 6:3 and Matthew 13:55.
- Judas Barsabbas, one of the early Christian apostles some time after Jesus' death, features in Acts 15 together with Silas. He is possibly a brother of Joseph Barsabbas, but the last name could also be a coincidence.
- Jude, brother of James; the author of the Epistle of Jude. Scholars are divided on the question whether this Judas/Jude is the same as Judas, brother of Jesus (Matthew 13:55) or an otherwise unknown Judas/Jude, or a forgery in the name of a famous Judas. However, they generally agree he is someone else than Jude the Apostle, son of James.
- Judas the Galilean (Acts 5:37), an anti-Roman Jewish rebel leader whose revolt against Quirinius was crushed around 6 AD.
- Judas, the owner of the house in Damascus where Ananias is sent to find Saul of Tarsus (Acts 9:11) after his 'road to Damascus' conversion.

== See also ==
- New Testament people named James
- New Testament people named John
- New Testament people named Joseph (or Joses)
- New Testament people named Mary
- New Testament people named Simon
