= The Feast in the House of Simon the Pharisee (Rubens) =

Painting by Peter Paul Rubens

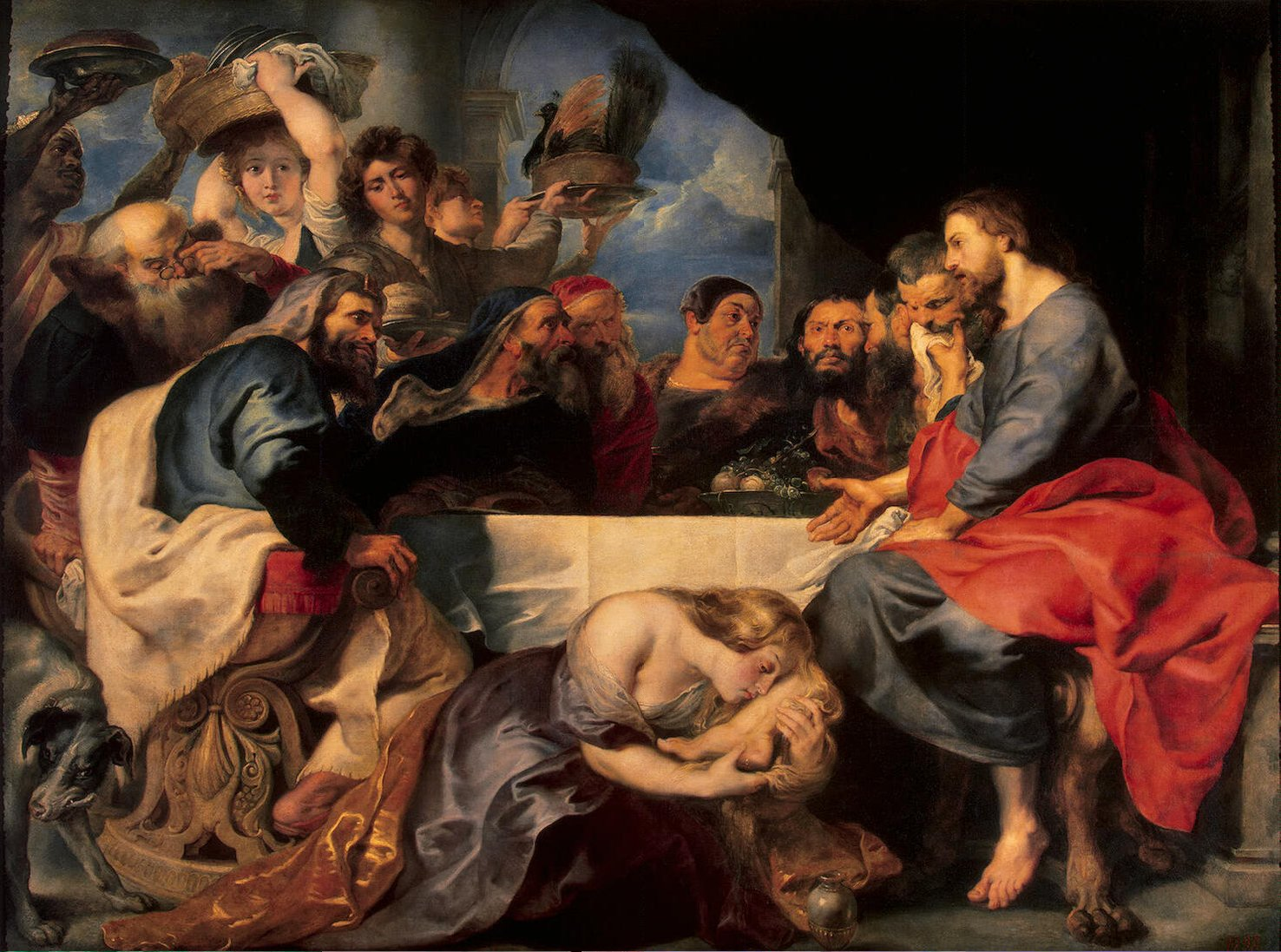
Feast in the House of Simon the Pharisee (c. 1618–1620) by Rubens

Feast in the House of Simon the Pharisee, also known as Christ in the Home of Simon the Pharisee, is a painting by Peter Paul Rubens. It was painted c. 1618–1620, and is in The Hermitage Museum, St. Petersburg.

The painting depicts an incident from Luke 7 where Jesus visits Simon the Pharisee, and has his feet anointed by a "sinful woman". Jesus proceeds to tell the Parable of the Two Debtors.
