= Parallel passage =

In biblical studies, a parallel passage is a passage in another portion of the Bible which describes the same event.

Comparison of parallel passages within the Bible is a major area of biblical scholarship. The Bible frequently describes the same event from different points of view in different canonical books yielding a more complete picture of the event than a single passage on the subject does. Some of the biblical passages describe an area of biblical study in an up close context whereas other passages provide information on the bigger picture surrounding the subject at hand. The Bible also provides partial information on some subjects in a given passage then adds additional information in other biblical passages. The technique of comparing scripture with scripture is important for determining correct biblical doctrine. Formulating a doctrine on a single scripture and ignoring the other scriptures on the subject can lead to erroneous conclusions.

For example, comparisons of Mark 15:47 and Mark 16:1–5 with their parallel passages Matthew 27:61 and Matthew 28:1–4 lead scholars to conclude that the phrases Mary Magdalene and Mary the mother of Joses and Mary Magdalene and Mary the mother of James in the Mark readings refer to the same two women.

Some Bibles mark parallel passages with a parallel symbol ($\parallel$) to help readers locate comparable passages.

== See also ==
- Synoptic Gospels
