= Simon the Leper =

Biblical figure

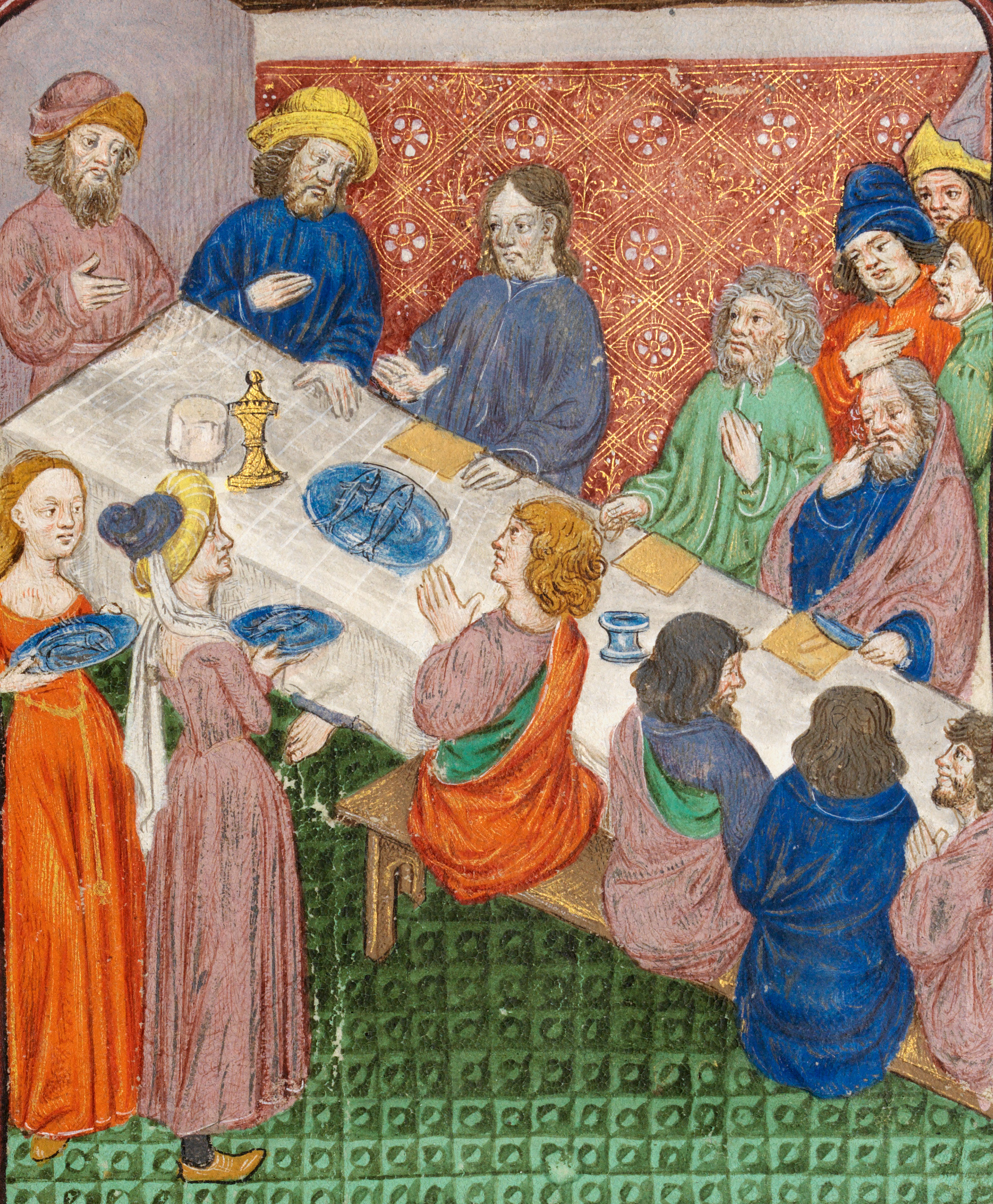
Christ and disciples at the table in the house of Simon the Leper, with Mary Magdalene and Martha serving

Simon the Leper (Greek: Σίμων ὁ λεπρός, Símōn ho leprós) is a biblical figure who lived in Bethany, a village in Judaea on the southeastern slope of the Mount of Olives. He is mentioned in the Gospels according to Matthew and Mark. These books tell of how Jesus made a visit to the house of Simon the Leper at Bethany during the course of which a woman anoints the head of Jesus with costly ointment. Bethany was also the home of Mary, Martha, and Lazarus.

== Biblical accounts ==
The Gospel according to John recounts an episode with many similarities. John reports that Jesus attended a dinner where Lazarus reclined at the table with Jesus, and where Martha served the guests. According to John's Gospel, Jesus arrived in Bethany six days before Passover, and while there, a dinner was given in His honor. John does not say when or by whom this dinner was given. According to John's Gospel, Mary anointed Jesus' feet. Matthew and John report that Judas Iscariot and other disciples of Jesus were in attendance and protested the costly anointing of Jesus.

== Identification ==
Simon the Leper is sometimes identified with Simon the Pharisee (see Shimon ben Gamliel), who is mentioned in the Gospel of Luke as the host of a meal during which the feet of Jesus are anointed by a penitent woman. Because of some similarities, efforts have been made to reconcile the events and characters, but some scholars have pointed out differences between the two events. An alternative explanation for the similarities is that the Luke 7 anointing and the anointing at Bethany happened with some of the same participants, but several years apart.

Simon the Leper is also sometimes identified as the same person as Lazarus of Bethany, or identified as his father or brother. This is because Matthew and Mark mention Simon, while John mentions Lazarus, but all four gospels assume one lodging at Bethany during the last week. Abbé Drioux identified all three as one: Lazarus of Bethany, Simon the Leper of Bethany, and the Lazarus of the parable, on the basis that in the parable Lazarus is depicted as a leper, and due to a perceived coincidence between Luke 22:2 and John 12:10—where after the raising of Lazarus, Caiaphas and Annas tried to have him killed.

A medieval legend identifies Simon with Bishop Julian of Le Mans, despite the fact that Julian lived much later.
