= Simon the Pharisee =

Figure mentioned in the Gospel of Luke

Simon was a Pharisee mentioned in the Gospel of Luke (Luke 7:36-50) as the host of a meal, who invited Jesus to eat in his house but failed to show him the usual marks of hospitality offered to visitors - a greeting kiss (v. 45), water to wash his feet (v. 44), or oil for his head (v. 46).

During the meal, a tearful woman identified as a sinner anointed Jesus' feet. He contrasted her faith and care with Simon's failure to show common decency, and accused him of being forgiven little and (in consequence) loving little (v. 47).

The preceding sections of Luke's gospel took place in Capernaum and in Nain, both in Galilee, suggesting Simon also lived in Galilee.

Simon the Pharisee is not mentioned in the other canonical gospels, but there are similarities between this Simon and Simon the leper mentioned in Matthew's Gospel (Matt 26:6-13) and Mark's Gospel (Mk 14:3-9). Because of these similarities, efforts have been made to reconcile the events and characters. However, it is unlikely that Simon the Pharisee is the same person as Simon the Leper; the name Simon was the most common given name in first century Judea. There are differences in the location and timing of these events and the earliest harmonisation of the Gospels, the Diatessaron of Tatian, treats both events separately.

An alternative explanation for the similarities is that the Luke 7 anointing and the anointing at Bethany (Matthew 26:6, Mark 14:3, John 12:1) happened with some of the same participants, but several years apart.

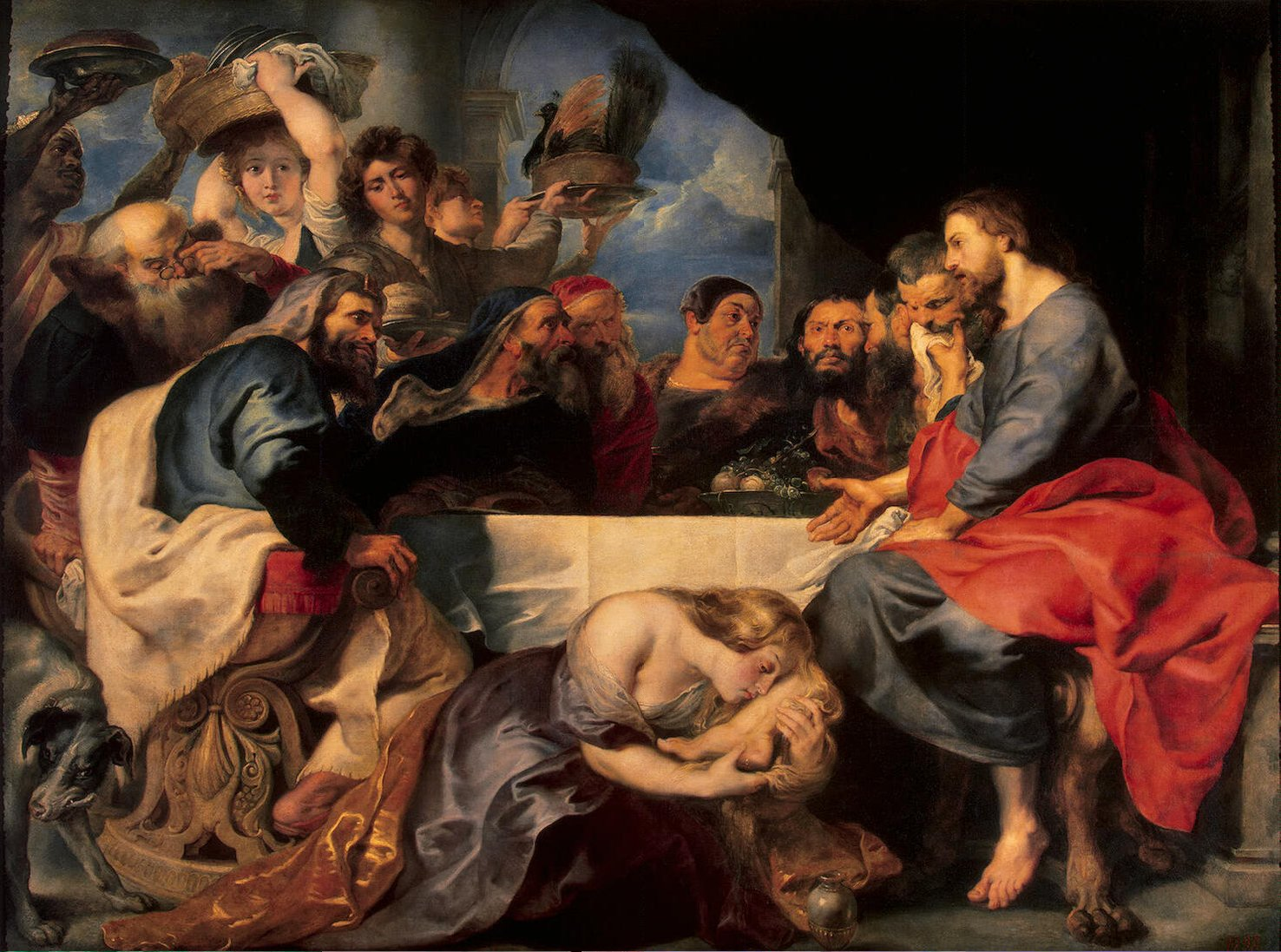
Feast in the House of Simon the Pharisee by Rubens, c. 1618, State Hermitage Museum, Russia

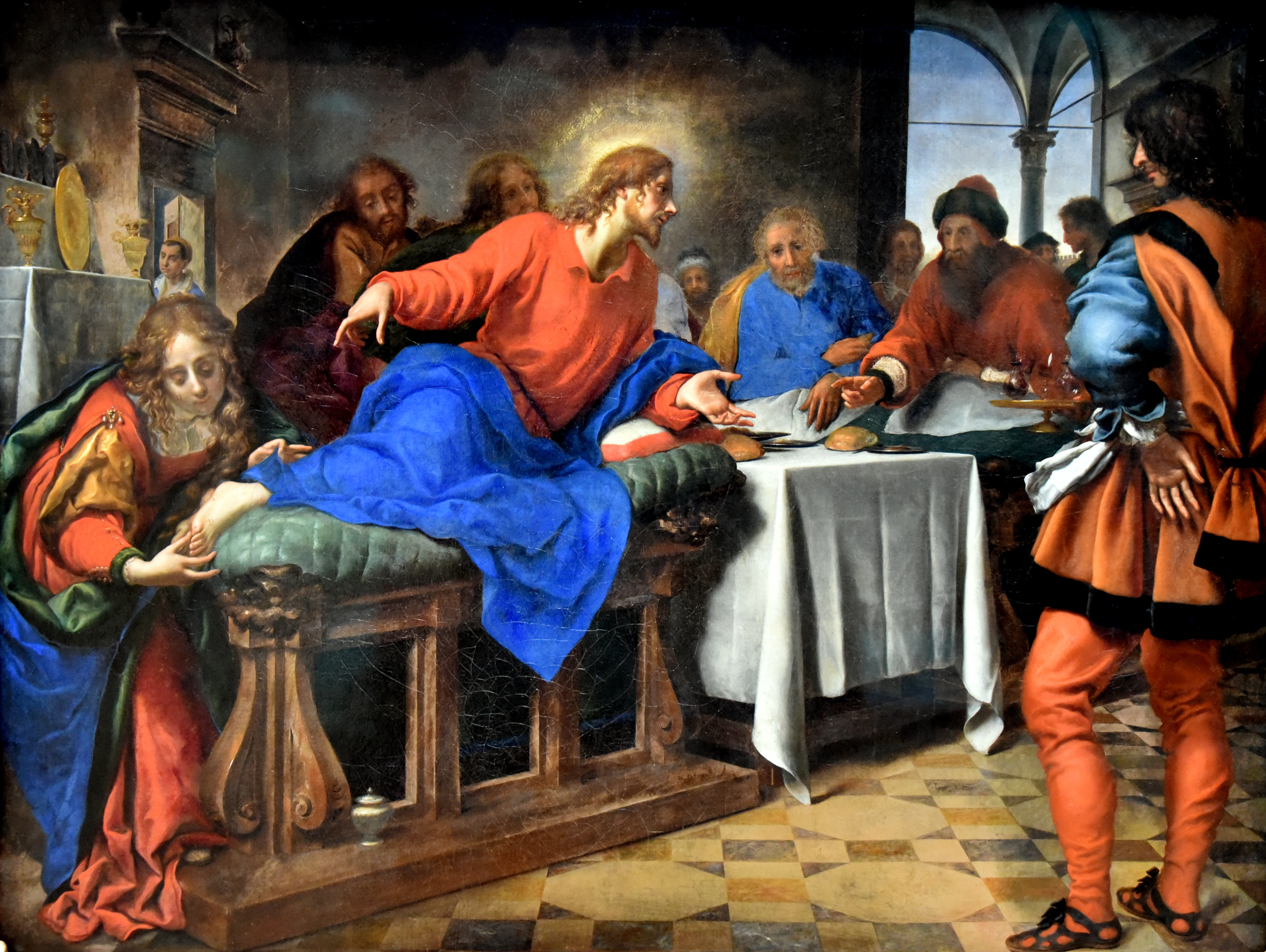
Christ and Mary Magdalene in the House of Simon, 1645, by Carlo Dolci, Nationalmuseum, Stockholm, Sweden

== See also ==
- Luke 7
