= John 16 =

- ← chapter 15 chapter 17 →
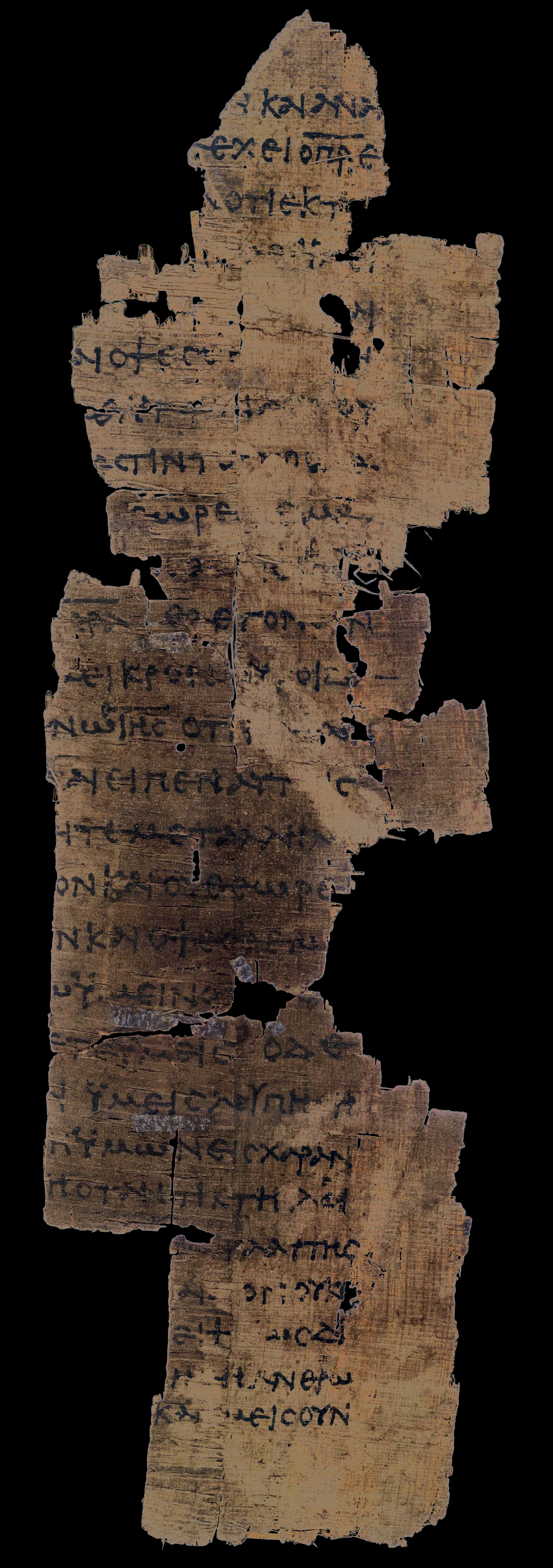
- John 16:14-22 on the recto side of Papyrus 5, written about AD 250
- Book: Gospel of John
- Category: Gospel
- Christian Bible part: New Testament
- Order in the Christian part: 4

John 16 is the sixteenth chapter of the Gospel of John in the New Testament of the Christian Bible. It records Jesus' continued Farewell Discourse to his disciples, set on the last night before his crucifixion. In this chapter, Jesus speaks about the work of the Holy Spirit, the joy of the believers and his victory over the world. The gospel identifies an unnamed "disciple whom Jesus loved" as its source and possible author. Early Christian tradition uniformly affirmed that John composed this Gospel.

== Text ==
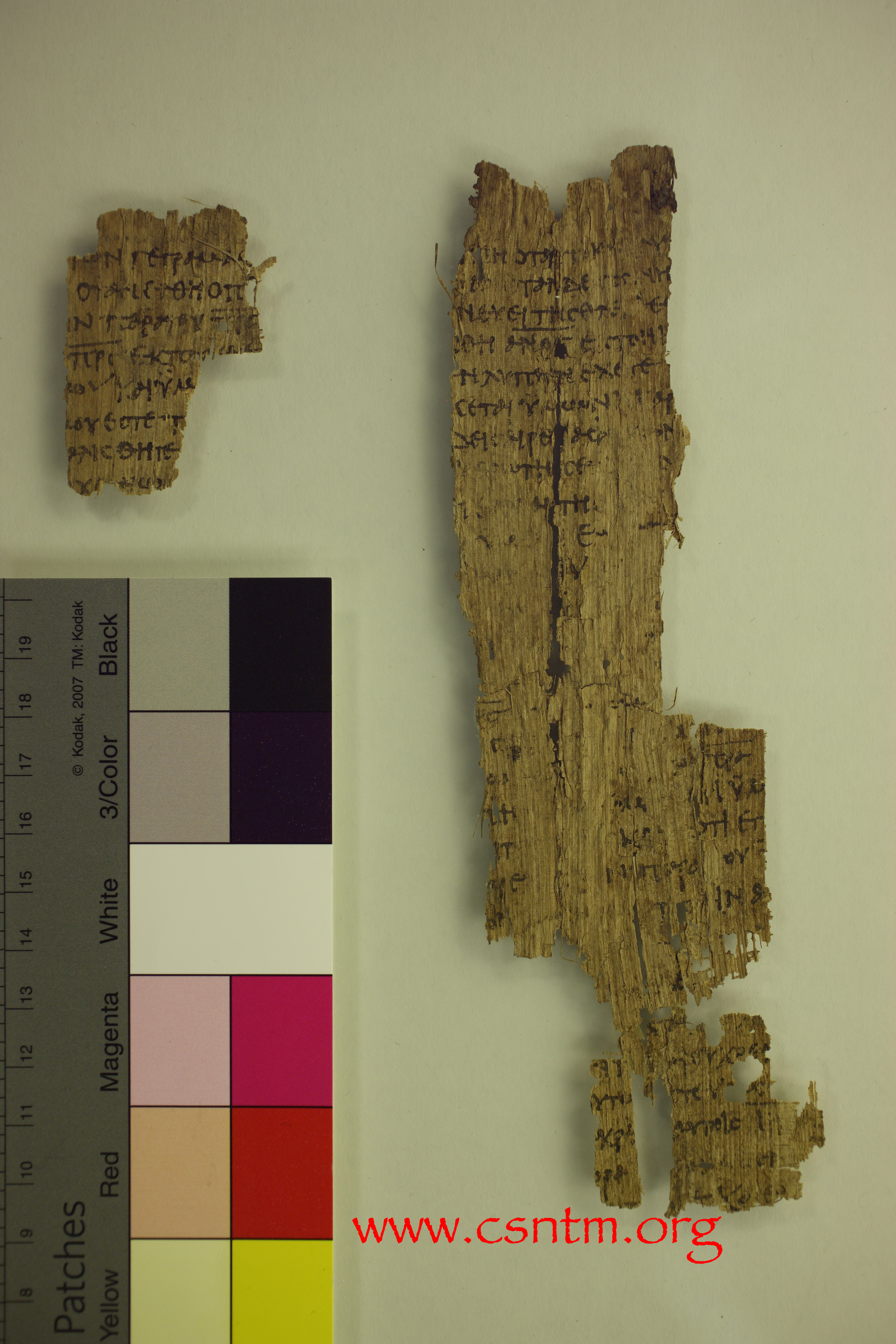
John 15:25-16:2 on the recto side of Papyrus 22, written c. AD 250

The original text was written in Koine Greek. This chapter is divided into 33 verses.

=== Textual witnesses ===
Some early manuscripts containing the text of this chapter are:

- Papyrus 75 (AD 175–225)
- Papyrus 5 (c. 250; extant verses: 14–30)
- Papyrus 22 (c. 250)
- Codex Vaticanus (325–350)
- Codex Sinaiticus (330–360)
- Codex Bezae (c. 400)
- Codex Alexandrinus (400–440)
- Codex Ephraemi Rescriptus (c. 450; extant verses 22–33)
- Papyrus 60 (c. 700; extant verses 29–33).

== Places ==
The setting for the discourse in this chapter and the following chapter appears to be in Jerusalem. The precise location is not specified, but John 18:1 states that afterwards, "Jesus left with his disciples and crossed the Kidron Valley".

== Purpose ==
The evangelist's purpose in this section of his gospel is to support the early Church for whom he is writing, to ensure that they do not fall away (Greek: ινα μη σκανδαλισθητε, hina mē skandalisthēte) (John 16:1). Some commentators suggest he is writing for a specific group of believers called the Johannine Community.

== Verse 1 ==
All this I have told you so that you will not fall away.

Heinrich Meyer relates "all this" to John 15:18–27, the section of this discourse which anticipates the world's hatred for the disciples.

English translations vary widely in the way they treat the opening verse of this chapter:

- that ye should not be caused to stumble (American Standard Version)
- that ye should not lose faith (21st Century King James Version)
- that ye should not be offended. (Geneva Bible)
- that you should not be offended (taken unawares and falter, or be caused to stumble and fall away (Amplified Bible)
- so that you will not fall away (New International Version)
- so that you won't be caught by surprise (Complete Jewish Bible)
- to keep you from being afraid (Contemporary English Version)
- that you may not be scandalized (Douay–Rheims Bible)
- so that you won't lose your faith when you face troubles (Easy-to-Read Version)
- to keep you from stumbling (NRSV)
- that you may avoid the offenses that are coming (The Voice)
- so that your faith may not be shaken (Jerusalem Bible)
- so that you may not be tripped (note on 'literal' translation in Jerusalem Bible)
- so that you will not turn back (Bible in Worldwide English)

Meyer observes that

Prepared beforehand, and armed by Christ’s communications, they were not to be made to stumble at Him, but were to oppose to the hatred of the world all the greater efficiency and constancy of faith.

== Verse 2 ==
They will put you out of the synagogues;

Jesus foretells the exclusion from the Jewish synagogues (Greek: ἀποσυνάγωγος) which the evangelist has already alluded to in John 9:22 and 12:42. This verse continues:

yes, the time is coming that whoever kills you will think that he offers God service.

For "service", the Greek has the word λατρεια, meaning divine worship (see Latria).

== Verse 4 ==
But these things I have told you, that when the time comes, you may remember that I told you of them.

And these things I did not say to you at the beginning, because I was with you.

Lutheran writer Johann Bengel notes that while Jesus had not said these things before, he was previously aware of the hatred which would arise.

== Verse 5 ==
Now I am going back to the One who sent me. But none of you asks me, 'Where are you going?'

The King James Version adopted the wording "I go my way" for this verse.

William Robertson Nicoll comments that the disciples' failure to ascertain clearly where Jesus was going reflected their absorption with "the thought of His departure and its consequences of bereavement [for] themselves".

== Verses 8-11 ==
Commentator Henry Alford refers to three key words in this chapter, ἁμαρτία, δικαιοσύνη, κρίσις (sin, righteousness and judgment, John 16:8–11) which "comprehend the three great steps of advance in spiritual truth among men".

== Verse 13 ==
However, when He, the Spirit of truth, has come, He will guide you into all truth; for He will not speak on His own authority, but whatever He hears He will speak; and He will tell you things to come.

Alford advises that in the words all truth, "no promise of universal knowledge, nor of infallibility, is hereby conveyed; but a promise to them and us, that the Holy Spirit shall teach and lead us, not as children, under the tutors and governors of legal and imperfect knowledge, but as sons".

== Verse 24 ==
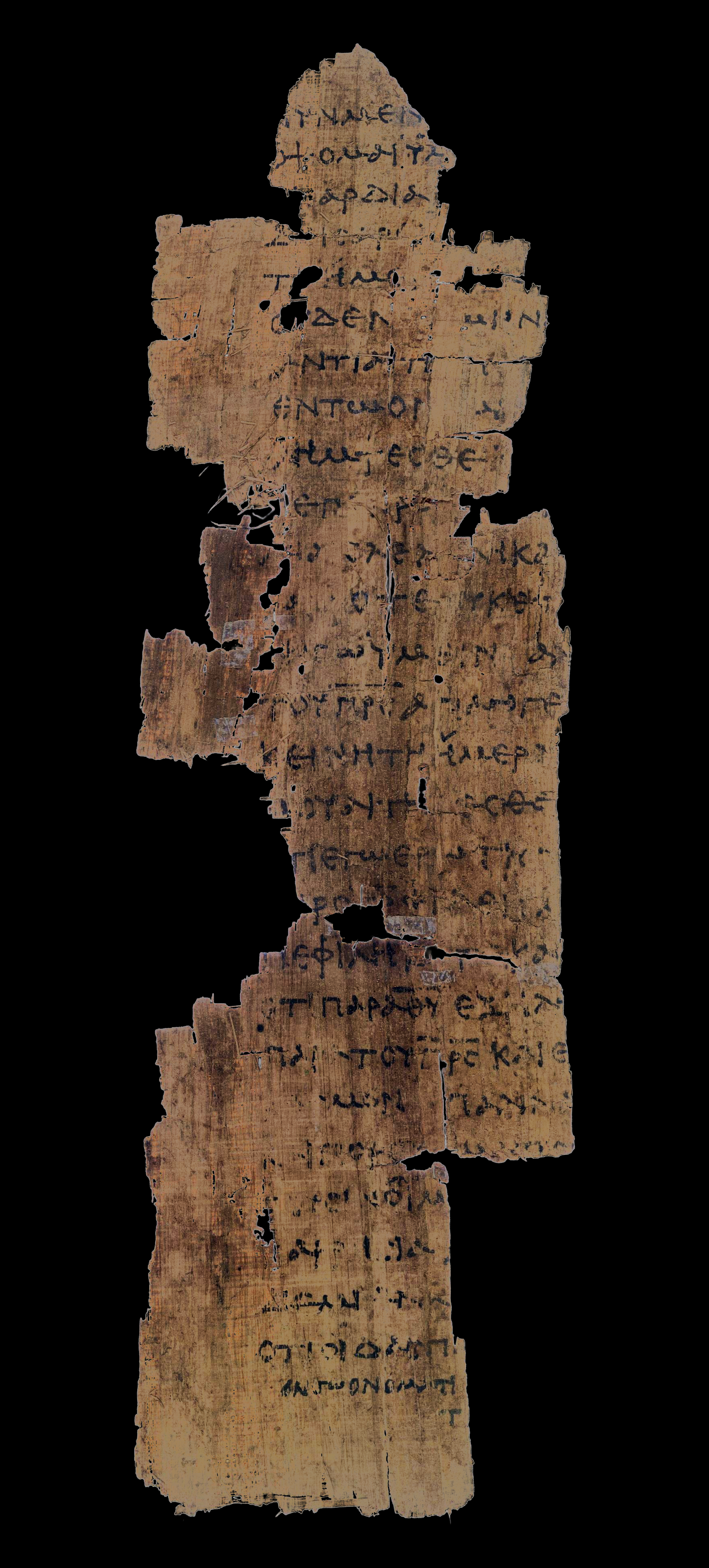
Fragment of John 16:22-30 on the verso side of Papyrus 5, written c. AD 250.

Until now you have asked nothing in My name. Ask, and you will receive, that your joy may be full.

See also: Matthew 7:7-8 and Luke 11:9-10.

== See also ==
- Farewell Discourse
- Jerusalem
- Jesus Christ
- Related chapters: John 13, John 14, John 15, John 17

Preceded by John 15	Chapters of the Bible; Gospel of John	Succeeded by John 17
