= John 17 =

- ← chapter 16 chapter 18 →
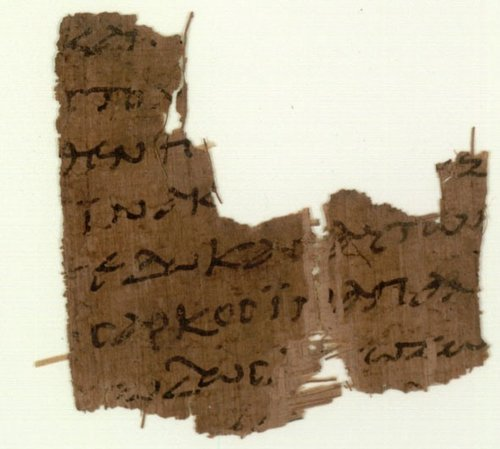
- John 17:1–2 on Papyrus 107, written in 3rd century
- Book: Gospel of John
- Category: Gospel
- Christian Bible part: New Testament
- Order in the Christian part: 4

John 17 is the seventeenth chapter of the Gospel of John in the New Testament of the Christian Bible. It portrays a prayer of Jesus Christ addressed to his Father, placed in context immediately before his betrayal and crucifixion, the events which the gospel often refers to as his glorification. Lutheran writer David Chytraeus entitled Jesus' words "the prayer of the high priest". Methodist theologian Joseph Benson calls this prayer "Our Lord’s Intercessory Prayer", because "it is considered as a pattern of the intercession he is now making in heaven for his people". The New King James Version divides this chapter into three sections:

- John 17:1–5: Jesus Prays for Himself
- John 17:6–19: Jesus Prays for His Disciples
- John 17:20–26: Jesus Prays for All Believers.

The gospel identifies an unnamed "disciple whom Jesus loved" as its source and possible author. Early Christian tradition uniformly affirmed that John composed this Gospel.

== Text ==
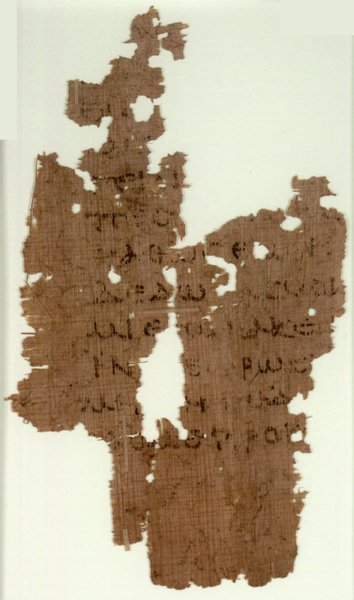
John 17:23–24 on Papyrus 108 (2nd/3rd century)

The original text was written in Koine Greek. This chapter is divided into 26 verses.

=== Textual witnesses ===
Some early manuscripts containing the text of this chapter are:

- Papyrus 108 (2nd/3rd century; extant verses 23–24)
- Papyrus 66 (~200; complete)
- Papyrus 107 (3rd century; extant verses 1–2,11)
- Codex Vaticanus (325–350)
- Codex Sinaiticus (330–360)
- Codex Bezae (~400)
- Codex Alexandrinus (400–440)
- Codex Ephraemi Rescriptus (~450; complete)
- Papyrus 84 (6th century; extant verses 3, 7–8)
- Papyrus 60 (~700; complete)
- Papyrus 59 (7th century; extant verses 24–26).

== Old Testament references ==
- John 17:12: Psalm 109:7

== Jesus' Prayer ==
Jesus refers to his Father six times in this chapter, calling God "Father" (Greek: πατηρ, pater), "Holy Father" (Greek: πάτερ ἅγιε, pater hagie, John 17:11) and "Righteous Father" (Greek: πάτερ δίκαιε, pater dikaie, John 17:25). These are the only occurrences in the New Testament of the vocative forms αγιε and δικαιε, used in direct address to God.

=== Verse 1 ===
Jesus spoke these words, lifted up His eyes to heaven, and said: "Father, the hour has come. Glorify Your Son, that Your Son also may glorify You".

Alternatively, "After Jesus had spoken these words ..." (to his disciples, in chapter 16), namely:

"These things I have spoken to you, that in Me you may have peace. In the world you will have tribulation; but be of good cheer, I have overcome the world."

Benson suggested that "these words" refers to "the words recorded in the three preceding chapters" (chapters 14 to 16).

=== Verse 2 ===
"As You have given Him authority over all flesh, that He should give eternal life to as many as You have given Him.

"Over all flesh" (σαρκός, sarkos), from the noun σὰρξ (sarx), becomes "all people" in the New International Version and the Good News Translation. Alfred Plummer argues that "fallen man, man in his frailty, is specially meant".

=== Verse 4 ===
I have glorified You on the earth. I have finished the work which You have given Me to do.

This is the first of six summaries given in this chapter of the ministry of Jesus Christ on earth. The others are to be found in verses 6-8, 12, 14, 22-23, 25-26.

=== Verse 10 ===
All mine are yours, and yours are mine, and I am glorified in them.

Jesus explains parenthetically, how they belong to the Father, although given by him to the Son. Irish Archbishop John McEvilly comments that

The Father does not lose His right over them. For, all things belonging to the Son, belong to the Father. All things the Father gave Him either in His eternal or temporal birth, belong still to the Father, on account of the unity and identity of nature, and all Divine perfections in both, in common with the Holy Ghost. And they belong to the Son; because given by the Father, whose right or claim does not cease, owing to this concession; but, remains still the same, as before.

=== Verse 11 ===
Now I am no longer in the world, but these are in the world, and I come to You. Holy Father, keep through Your name those whom You have given Me, that they may be one as We are.

Swedish-based commentator René Kieffer distinguishes chapter 17 from the rest of Jesus' farewell discourse, referring to "a kind of timeless aspect" denoted by the words "I am no longer in the world".

In verse 11b, the holiness of God, whom Jesus calls "Father", can be contrasted with "the unholiness of the world", or the "unholy atmosphere" in which Jesus' disciples remain. The Jerusalem Bible and Richard Francis Weymouth's version of the New Testament both suggest the reading "keep [them] true to your/thy name".

=== Verse 12 ===
New King James Version

While I was with them in the world, I kept them in Your name. Those whom You gave Me I have kept; and none of them is lost except the son of perdition, that the Scripture might be fulfilled.

The words "in the world" are omitted by the most reliable early texts. Judas' actions fulfill the words of Psalm 41:9:

Even my close friend, someone I trusted, one who shared my bread, has turned against me.

=== Verse 20 ===
I do not pray for these alone, but also for those who will believe in Me through their word.

McEvilly divides Jesus' prayer into four parts: his prayers for himself (verses 1-5), for his disciples (verses 6-19), specifically for those who will come to faith through the teaching of the apostles (verse 20) and finally for the whole church (verses 21-26).

=== Verse 21 ===
[T]hat they all may be one, as You, Father, are in Me, and I in You; that they also may be one in Us, that the world may believe that You sent Me.

== See also ==
- Farewell Discourse
- Jerusalem
- Jesus Christ
- That they all may be one
- Ut unum sint
- Related chapters: John 13, John 14, John 15, John 16

Preceded by John 16	Chapters of the Bible; Gospel of John	Succeeded by John 18
