= John 18 =

- ← chapter 17 chapter 19 →
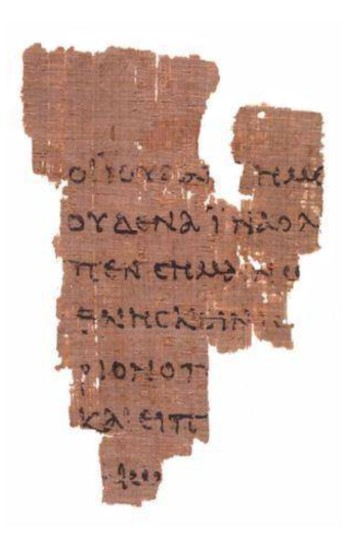
- John 18:31–33 on John Rylands Library Papyrus P52 (recto), written c. AD 125
- Book: Gospel of John
- Category: Gospel
- Christian Bible part: New Testament
- Order in the Christian part: 4

John 18 is the eighteenth chapter of the Gospel of John in the New Testament of the Christian Bible. This chapter records the events on the day of the Crucifixion of Jesus, starting with the arrest of Jesus the evening before (in Judaic calculation, this would be considered part of the same day). The three denials of Peter (John 18:15–18;25–26) are interwoven into the narrative concerning the trials of Jesus.

The gospel identifies an unnamed "disciple whom Jesus loved" as its source and author. Early Christian tradition generally considers that John the Evangelist composed the Gospel of John.

== Text ==
The original text was written in Koine Greek. This chapter is divided into 40 verses.

=== Textual witnesses ===
Some early manuscripts containing the text of this chapter are:

- Rylands Library Papyrus P52 (AD ~125; extant verses 31–33, 37–38)
- Papyrus 90 (AD 150–175; extant verses 36–40)
- Papyrus 108 (2nd/3rd century; extant verses 1–5)
- Papyrus 66 (AD ~200; complete)
- Codex Vaticanus (AD 325–350)
- Codex Sinaiticus (AD 330–360)
- Codex Bezae (AD ~400)
- Codex Alexandrinus (AD 400–440)
- Codex Ephraemi Rescriptus (AD ~450; extant verses 1–35)
- Papyrus 60 (AD ~700; complete)
- Papyrus 59 (7th century; extant verses 1–2, 16–17, 22).

== Places ==
The events recorded in this chapter took place in Jerusalem.

== Jesus' betrayal and arrest in Gethsemane (verses 1-11) ==
The opening of chapter 18 is directly connected with the final words of chapter 14:

Arise, let us go from here (John 14:31).

The intervening chapters record Jesus' Farewell Discourse. Alfred Plummer, in the Cambridge Bible for Schools and Colleges (1902), suggests that Jesus and His disciples have "rise[n] from table and prepare[d] to depart at John 14:31, but that the contents of chapters 15-17 are spoken before they leave the room". The editors of the New American Bible Revised Edition note that this gospel does not mention Jesus' Agony in the Garden or the kiss of Judas.

=== Verse 1 ===
When Jesus had spoken these words, He went out with His disciples over the Brook (or winter stream) Kidron, where there was a garden, which He and His disciples entered.

Some translations instead open with "When He had finished praying" or similar words. John Chrysostom observed that Jesus' words, "spoken for His disciples' sake" were at the same time "His prayer".

Matthew 26:36 and Mark 14:32 refer to "a place called Gethsemane", but the place is unnamed here, simply referred to as a garden. In Luke 22:39, the place is the Mount of Olives.

=== Verse 2 ===
And Judas, who betrayed Him, also knew the place; for Jesus often met there with His disciples.

Judas is now called "Judas the betrayer" or "Judas, who is betraying" (Greek: ιουδας ο παραδιδους, ioudas ho paradidous) (John 18:2 and again in verse 5). He comes to this familiar place with troops, a captain and officers and servants of the chief priests and the Pharisees, carrying torches and lanterns and weapons (verse 6, cf. verse 12). H. W. Watkins surmises that Gethsemane might have been belonged to "a friend or disciple" of Jesus. Where many modern translations say that Jesus "met" there with his disciples, or "gathered" there in the Revised Geneva Translation, older versions such as the King James states that they "resorted" there.

The New American Standard Bible notes that the troops were the Roman cohort (Greek: σπεῖρα, speira in John 18:3 is the technical word for the Roman cohort) whereas Richard Francis Weymouth identified them as a detachment of the Temple police. This was the garrison band from Fort Antonia, at the north-east corner of the Temple. Peter also came with a weapon (verses 10–11):

Then Simon Peter, having a sword, drew it and struck the high priest’s servant, and cut off his right ear. The servant’s name was Malchus.

=== Verse 4 ===
Jesus therefore, knowing all things that would come upon Him, went forward and said to them, “Whom are you seeking?”

Plummer notes from this verse that the evangelist's narrative confirms:

- the voluntariness of Christ's sufferings, and
- the fulfilment of a divine plan in Christ's sufferings

and that the aim of the narrative is to endorse Jesus' earlier words,

I lay down My life that I may take it again. No one takes it from Me, but I lay it down of Myself. I have power to lay it down, and I have power to take it again.

and the evangelist's earlier commentary

Jesus knew that His hour had come that He should depart from this world to the Father, having loved His own who were in the world, He loved them to the end.

=== Verse 5 ===
"Jesus of Nazareth", they answered.
"I am he", he said.
Judas, the traitor, was standing there with them.

A more literal translation of the guards' answer is "Jesus the Nazarene", which Plummer calls "a rather more contemptuous expression than 'Jesus of Nazareth'". Jesus' response is Ἐγώ εἰμι (ego eimi, I am): the word 'he' is not expressed in the Greek text. This is a familiar expression throughout John's Gospel, seen in John 4:26, 6:20, 8:24, 8:28, 8:58, and 13:13. Plummer comments that "Judas, if not the chief priests, must have noticed the significant words". Verses 6 and 8 repeat the words Ἐγώ εἰμι (in English, "I am he").

=== Verse 9 ===
That the saying might be fulfilled which He spoke, "Of those whom You gave Me I have lost none".

According to the New American Bible Revised Edition, the citation may refer to John 6:39, 10:28 or 17:12.

- John 6:39: This is the will of the Father who sent Me, that of all He has given Me I should lose nothing, but should raise it up at the last day.
- John 10:28: And I give them eternal life, and they shall never perish; neither shall anyone snatch them out of My hand.
- John 17:12: While I was with them in the world, I kept them in Your name. Those whom You gave Me I have kept; and none of them is lost except the son of perdition, that the Scripture might be fulfilled.

Henry Alford, Plummer, and Watkins concur in associating this verse with John 17:12. Alford uses this fulfillment to argue (as "an unquestionable proof") that John 17 is a historical account of the words of Jesus and not merely "a description of the mind of our Lord at the time".

=== Verse 11 ===
So Jesus said to Peter, "Put the sword into the sheath; the cup which the Father has given Me, am I not to drink it?"

Heinrich Meyer argues that "the sword" is the original wording, and that "your sword", which is widely used wording in modern English translations, is an import, "against decisive witnesses", from Matthew 26:52.

== In the High Priest's courtyard (verses 12-27) ==
Jesus and "another disciple", or "the other disciple", who was known to the high priest, are taken to the High Priest's courtyard, where initially Jesus meets with Annas. The other disciple then brings in Peter. Unusually, John Wycliffe's bible translates Greek: τω αρχιερει, tō archierei as "the bishop".

=== Verse 19 ===
The high priest then asked Jesus about His disciples and His doctrine.

Annas is here referred to as "the high priest", although Caiaphas was the high priest that year (John 18:13). Meyer notes that Jesus ignores the first part of the question and answers only the second part, "and that by putting it aside as something entirely aimless, appealing to the publicity of His life".

== In Pilate's court (verses 28-38) ==
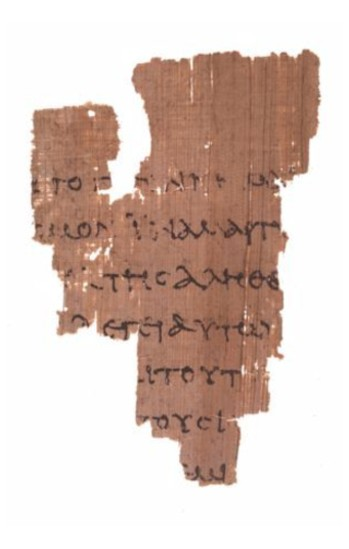
John 18:37–38 on the verso side of John Rylands Library Papyrus P52 (~AD 125).

=== Verse 28 ===
Then they [the Jewish leaders] led Jesus from Caiaphas to the Praetorium, and it was early morning. But they themselves did not go into the Praetorium, lest they should be defiled, but that they might eat the Passover.

The Jewish leaders: words supplied by the New International Version to clarify "they". The reference is to the Sanhedrists, according to Scottish Free Church minister William Nicoll. The text here confirms that in John's timeline, the trial of Jesus took place before the Passover and therefore likewise the events of chapters 13-17 preceded the Passover: cf. John 13:1: before the Feast of the Passover ...

=== Verse 31 ===
Then Pilate said to them, "You take Him and judge Him according to your law."
Therefore the Jews said to him, "It is not lawful for us to put anyone to death."

John's gospel is alone in offering this reason for his accusers bringing Jesus before Pilate.

=== Verses 33-34 ===
^{33} So Pilate entered his headquarters again and called Jesus and said to him, "Are you the King of the Jews?" ^{34} Jesus answered, "Do you say this of your own accord, or did others say it to you about me?"

Verna Holyhead writes that here, Jesus who is on trial confronts Pilate, calling on him to decide whether his own personal commitment underlies the question, or his concern for what "others" have said: "the issue is no longer Jesus' guilt or innocence, but whether Pilate will respond to the truth of Jesus' kingship".

=== Verse 37 ===
Pilate therefore said to Him, "Are You a king then?"
Jesus answered, “You say rightly that I am a king.

For this cause I was born, and for this cause I have come into the world,
that I should bear witness to the truth.
Everyone who is of the truth hears My voice.”

The question repeats Pilate's question in verse 33. Cross reference: Matthew 27:11; Mark 15:2; Luke 23:3

== What is truth? (verses 39-40) ==
=== Verse 38 ===
Pilate said to Him, "What is truth?"
And when he had said this, he went out again to the Jews,

and said to them, "I find no fault in Him at all".

== See also ==
- Arrest of Jesus
- Barabbas
- Denial of Peter
- Jerusalem
- Jesus Christ
- Pontius Pilate
- Rylands Library Papyrus P52
- Sanhedrin trial of Jesus
- Related gospel chapters: Matthew 26, Matthew 27, Mark 14, Mark 15, Luke 22, Luke 23, John 13, John 19

Preceded by John 17	Chapters of the Bible; Gospel of John	Succeeded by John 19
