= P108 =

P108 may refer to:

- ARM Juan N. Álvarez (P108), a patrol boat of the Mexican Navy
- Boulton Paul P.108 Balliol, a British trainer aircraft
- Papyrus 108, an early copy of the New Testament in Greek
- Piaggio P.108, an Italian heavy bomber
- P108, a state regional road in Latvia
