= John 14 =

John 14:28
- ← chapter 13 chapter 15 →
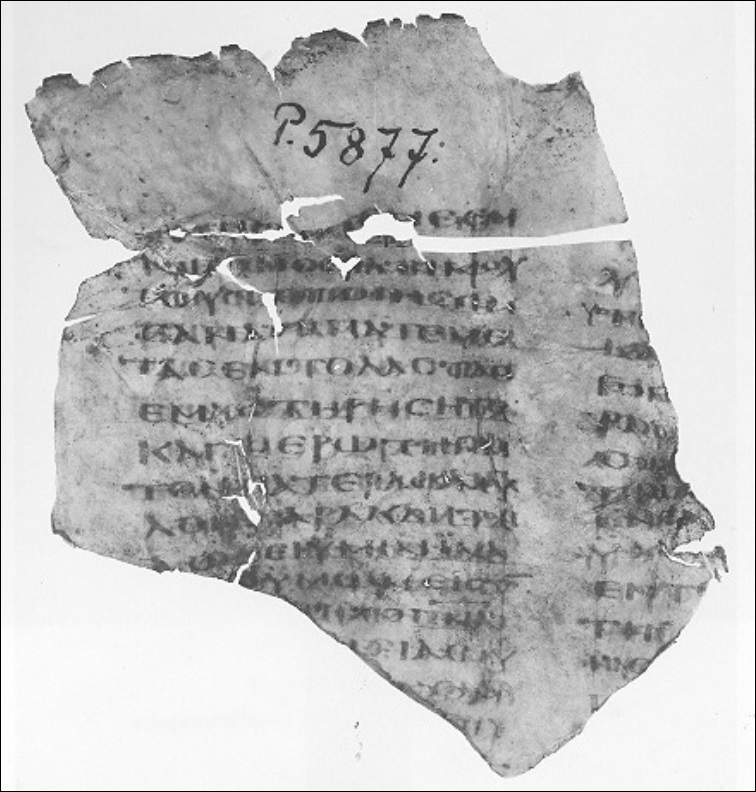
- John 14 (verses 14-17, 19-21) on Uncial 060, written about 6th century
- Book: Gospel of John
- Category: Gospel
- Christian Bible part: New Testament
- Order in the Christian part: 4

John 14 is the fourteenth chapter of the Gospel of John in the New Testament of the Christian Bible. It continues Jesus' discussions with his disciples in anticipation of his death and records the promised gift of the Holy Spirit. Jesus speaks individually with Thomas, Philip and Judas (not the Iscariot); throughout this chapter, Jesus' purpose is to strengthen the faith of the apostles. Christians traditionally believe that John composed this Gospel.

== Text ==
The original text was written in Koine Greek. This chapter is divided into 31 verses. Some early manuscripts containing the text of this chapter are:

- Papyrus 75 (AD 175–225)
- Papyrus 66 (~200)
- Codex Vaticanus (325–350)
- Codex Sinaiticus (330–360)
- Codex Bezae (~400)
- Codex Alexandrinus (400–440)
- Codex Ephraemi Rescriptus (~450; extant verses 1–7)

== Places ==
All the events recorded in this chapter and the succeeding chapters up to John 17 took place in Jerusalem. The precise location is not specified, but John 18:1 states that afterwards, "Jesus left with his disciples and crossed the Kidron Valley".

== Jesus' departure and his return ==
Chapter 14 continues, without interruption, Jesus' dialogue with his disciples regarding his approaching departure from them. H. W. Watkins describes the chapter break as "unfortunate, as it breaks the close connection between these words and those which have gone immediately before (John 13)", whereas Alfred Plummer, in the Cambridge Bible for Schools and Colleges, identifies John 14 as the opening of "the last great discourse", continuing to chapter 17.

Jesus's opening words in this chapter advise his disciples, "Do not let your heart (Greek: ὑμῶν ἡ καρδία, hymōn hē kardia - singular in the Greek, in Wycliffe's Bible and in the American Standard Version - be troubled" (John 14:1), words which are repeated in verse 27. Many English translations have the plural, hearts (e.g. Jerusalem Bible). Codex D and some other versions introduce into the text καὶ εϊπεν τοῖς μαθηταῖς αὐτοῦ (and he said to his disciples) but Bengel's Gnomon says that "the mass of authorities is against [this]".

Verse 1b reads:

... you believe in God, believe also in Me. (New King James Version)

Augustine treats the text as "believe in God, believe also in me", and Bengel argues that both clauses are imperatives, whereas the Vulgate's wording, like the New King James Version, treats the first statement as indicative ("you believe ...") and builds the second ("[therefore], believe also ...") upon it. Heinrich Meyer lists "Erasmus, Luther (in his Exposition), Castalio, Beza, Calvin, Aretius, Maldonatus, Grotius, and several others" as writers who utilised the latter approach.

The purpose of Jesus' departure is to "go to prepare a place for [his disciples]. And if I go and prepare a place for you, I will come again and receive you to Myself; that where I am, there you may be also" (John 14:2-3). John 14:2 begins, in many English translations, with the statement "There are many rooms in my Father’s house", but the alternative, if it were not so, is presented in various ways:

if it were not so, I would have told you. (e.g. New King James Version, Geneva Bible)
if that weren’t the case, would I have told you that I’m going to prepare a place for you? (e.g. English Standard Version (ESV))

The latter reading is not supported by any previous text where Jesus had said he was going to prepare a place.

The Greek: μοναὶ (monai) is translated as "rooms" in the ESV, "mansions" in the King James Version, "mansions of bliss" in Irish archbishop John McEvilly's comments, and "dwelling places" in the New Revised Standard Version. The Textus Receptus presents Jesus' intention to prepare a place for His disciples as a separate sentence from the point about the availability of many rooms, whereas, in other versions, the promise that a place will be prepared is directly linked to the teaching that there are many rooms in the Father's house.

The Rastafari movement draws its umbrella term "Mansions of Rastafari" from verse 2, referring to the diverse groups within the movement. Augustine of Hippo and Thomas Aquinas argue from the reference to "many mansions" that the mansions vary in type and therefore reflect "different degrees of rewards":

In every well-ordered city there is a distinction of mansions. Now the heavenly kingdom is compared to a city (Apocalypse 21:2). Therefore we should distinguish various mansions there according to the various degrees of beatitude.

Verse 3 builds on this departure and preparation, when Jesus continues:

I will come again and receive you to Myself; that where I am, there you may be also. (New King James Version)

The words I will come again are in the present tense, and should be literally rendered, I am coming again. Watkins notes that "this clause has been variously explained: of the resurrection; of the death of individual disciples; of the spiritual presence of our Lord in the Church; [or] of the coming again of the Lord in the Parousia of the last day, when all who believe in Him shall be received unto Himself", but he prefers to read them as referring to Jesus' constant spiritual presence in the midst of His disciples.

== The Way, the Truth, and the Life ==
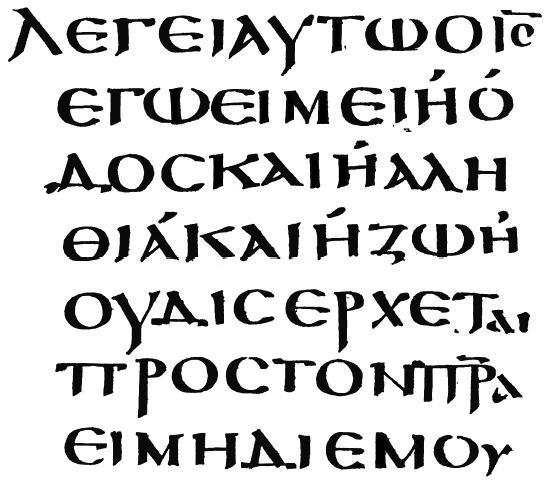
Text of John 14:6 on Codex Petropolitanus Purpureus (sixth century).

"Via, Veritas, Vita" on the coat of arms of Arad, Romania.

In the first of three individualised conversations in this chapter, Jesus speaks with Thomas.

Thomas said to Him, "Lord, we do not know where You are going, and how can we know the way?"

Plummer notes that they were in Jerusalem, "the royal city of the conquering Messiah", so the disciples may have thought they were in the place where Jesus would be "to restore the kingdom to Israel".

=== Verse 6 ===
Jesus said to him, "I am the way, the truth, and the life. No one comes to the Father except through Me."

The phrase "The Way" is also found in Acts 9:2 and 19:23 as a term to describe the early church. The pronoun is emphatic: it implies "I and no other". The Greek text also includes καὶ (kai, "and") before ἡ ἀλήθεια, (hē alētheia, "the truth"), a preference noted by Plummer and the Revised Standard Version.

=== Verse 7 ===
[Jesus said to Thomas:] "If you had known Me, you would have known My Father also; and from now on you know Him and have seen Him".

The words translated as "know" or "known" in verse 7 are ἐγνώκειτέ (egnōkate) and γινώσκετε (ginōskete) in the first and third occurrences, coming from the verb Greek: γινώσκω, (ginóskó, to come to know, recognize, perceive) whereas the second occurrence translates the Greek: ᾔδειτε (ēdeite), coming from the Greek: εἰδῶ (eidó: be aware, behold, consider, perceive), although the Textus Receptus has words derived from γινώσκω in all three instances. Ellicott explains that the words "are not identical in meaning. The former means, to know by observation, the latter to know by reflection. It is the difference between connaître and savoir [in French]; between kennen ("ken, k(e)now"), and wissen ("wit, wisdom") [in German]". The meaning may be expressed more exactly as, 'If ye had recognised Me, ye would have known My Father also'.

Philip, who had said to Nathaniel in John 1:46, "Come and see", takes over the dialogue from Thomas:

Lord, show us the Father, and it is sufficient for us. (John 14:8).

He still wants to see a further revelation, thinking that Jesus still has to show them a vision of God which has not yet been made visible. Jesus comments that He has been with His disciples (Greek: ὑμῶν, hymōn - plural) for "such a long time" (John 14:9) - Philip was one of the first disciples to follow Jesus - "and yet you (singular) have not known Me". Jesus speaks first to Philip, alone, "Do you not believe ..." (οὐ πιστεύεις, ou pisteueis - singular) and then to the eleven as a group, "Believe me ..." (πιστεύετέ, pisteuete - plural). Plummer explains that "the English obliterates the fact that Christ now turns from S. Philip and addresses all the eleven":

Believe me that I am in the Father, and the Father in me: or else believe me for the very works' sake (John 14:11).

John has previously referred to Jesus' works as His witness and a sign of His authority (John 5:36 and 10:25) but Jesus adds here:

He who believes in Me, the works that I do he will do also; and greater works than these he will do, because I go to My Father (John 14:12).

Lutheran theologian Harold Buls suggests that the "greater works" involve "send[ing] out the message of eternal life in great streams" to the gentiles, being the message which Jesus had only given to the Jews.

== Prayer (verses 12-14) ==
Jesus holds out "great promises in favour of prayer. Verse 13 states,

Whatever you ask in My name, that I will do, that the Father may be glorified in the Son

and verse 14 partially repeats this:

If you ask [me] anything in My name, I will do it.

The Byzantine monk and biblical commentator Euthymios Zigabenos states that "the promise is repeated ... for confirmation". Buls notes that both verses (13 and 14) "clearly imply that believers will have many needs", and that Jesus' commitment to doing what is asked of him and is asked in his name "results in - and has as its purpose - the clothing of the Father in splendour".

== Verses 15-27: the Paraclete ==
^{15} If you love me, you will keep my commandments. ^{16} And I will ask the Father, and he will give you another Advocate to be with you always.

Meyer notes that "my commandments" are "not those of the [Old Testament] but the completion of [them]". In the Greek text, verse 16 refers to αλλον παρακλητον (allon parakleton, another advocate): thus, Jesus is the first advocate or paraclete. The Amplified Bible lists Helper, Comforter, Advocate, Intercessor-Counselor, Strengthener, and Standby as possible translations. The Common English Bible offers "companion". The Jerusalem Bible opts for "advocate" but notes that "it is difficult to choose between the possible meanings". Buls suggests that "I will ask" denotes a request being made by one equal of another equal.

But the Helper, the Holy Spirit, whom the Father will send in My name, He will teach you all things, and bring to your remembrance all things that I said to you.

== The end of the chapter (verses 28–31) ==
As the chapter draws to a close in these verses, Jesus repeats that he is going away, but he will return. Pope Benedict XVI refers to the intervening period as a "long pilgrimage", noting that "two thousand years have passed so far" between the two events. A "new aspect" of Jesus' teaching in added in verse 28, where Jesus suggests that his disciples should "rejoice" because he is leaving them.

This passage finalises Jesus' discourse with his closest disciples:

I will no longer talk much with you (John 14:30a)

as his life now is solely directed to the task of obedience to his Father (John 14:31a-c).

Preparing to leave the upper room, he says to his disciples:

Arise, let us go from here (John 14:31d).

Their departure links logically with the opening words of chapter 18, When Jesus had spoken these words, He went out with His disciples over the Brook Kidron, where there was a garden, which He and His disciples entered. This connection has led some commentators to suppose that chapters 15-17 represent Jesus' discourse "as they went along in the way to Mount Olives", or "that they rise from table and prepare to depart, but that the contents of the next three chapters are spoken before they leave the room". In Mark 14:42 and Matthew 26:46, the same words "arise, let us go" (Greek: εγειρεσθε αγωμεν) appear within the Gethsemane narrative set later within those gospels' portrayal of Jesus' passion.

== Old Testament references ==
- John 14:6: Is 40:11

== See also ==
- Farewell Discourse
- Jerusalem
- Jesus Christ
- Via, Veritas, Vita
- Related chapters: John 13, John 15, John 16, John 17

| Preceded by John 13 | Chapters of the Bible; Gospel of John | Succeeded by John 15 |
