= Hans Hinrich Wendt =

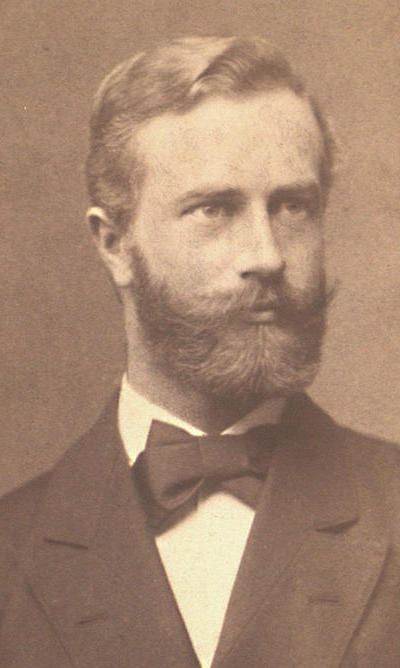
Hans Hinrich Wendt

Hans Hinrich Wendt (June 18, 1853, in Hamburg – January 19, 1928, in Jena) was a German Protestant theologian.

== Life ==
After studying theology at Leipzig, Göttingen and Tübingen, he became in 1885 professor ordinarius of systematic theology at Heidelberg, and in 1893 was called to Jena. His work on the teaching of Jesus (Die Lehre Jesu, 1886-1890; English translation of second part, 1892) made him widely known. He also edited several editions (5th to 8th, 1880-1898) of the Commentary on the Acts of the Apostles in Heinrich August Wilhelm Meyer's series. In May 1904 he delivered two addresses in London on The Idea and Reality of Revelation, and Typical Forms of Christianity, as the Essex Hall Lectures (published, 1904).

== Additional works ==
- Die christliche Lehre von der menschlichen Vollkommenheit (1882).
- Der Erfahrungsbeweis für die Wahrheit des Christentums (1897).
- Das Johannesevangelium (1900; English translation, 1902).
