= John 13 =

- ← chapter 12 chapter 14 →
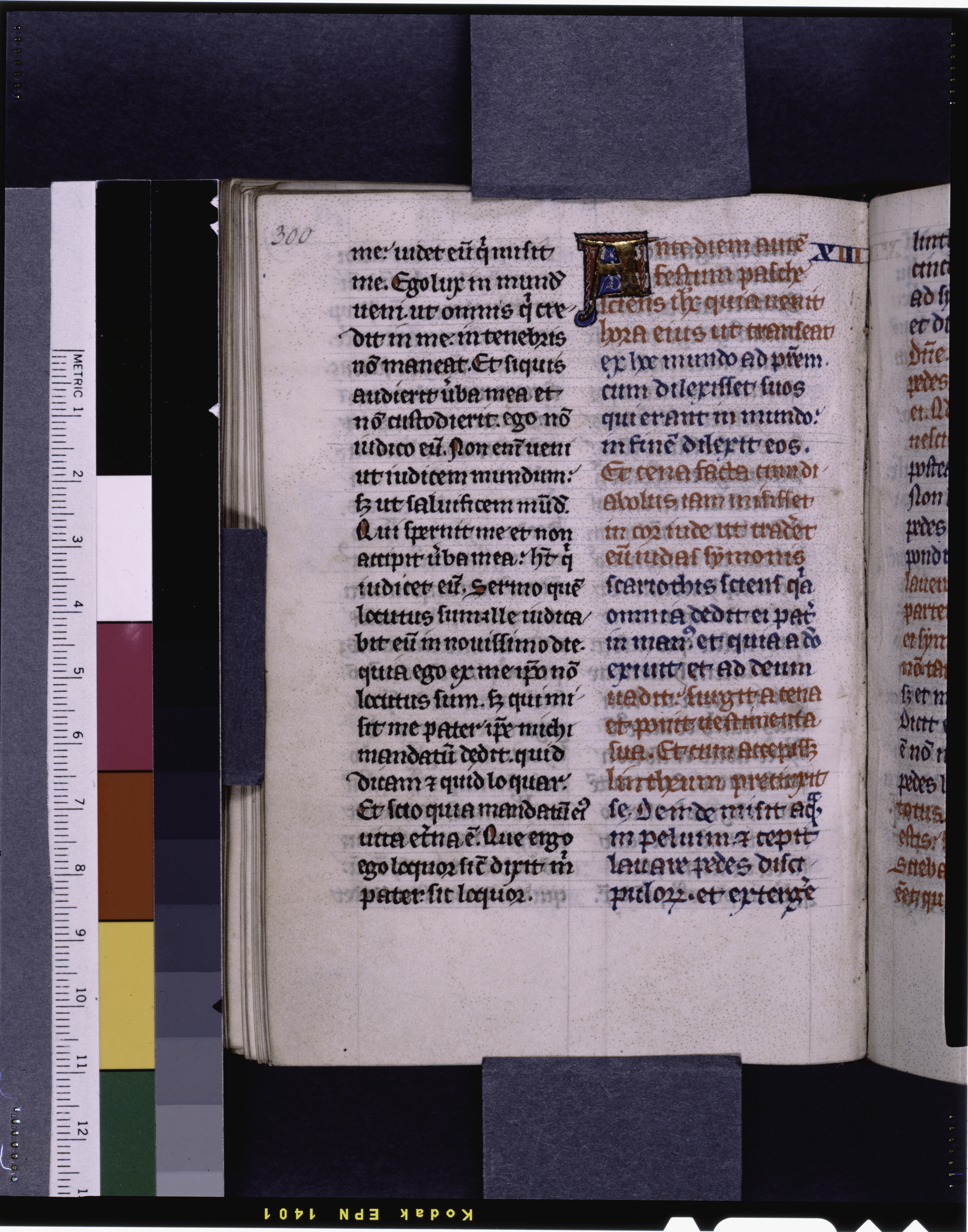
- Opening of John XIII with 2-line initial, written with verses alternating red and blue. Bibliotheca Swaniana, 13th century.
- Book: Gospel of John
- Category: Gospel
- Christian Bible part: New Testament
- Order in the Christian part: 4

John 13 is the thirteenth chapter of the Gospel of John in the New Testament of the Christian Bible. The "latter half", "second book", or "closing part" of John's Gospel commences with this chapter. The nineteenth-century biblical commentator Alexander Maclaren calls it "the Holy of Holies of the New Testament" and the "most sacred part of the New Testament", as it begins John's record of the events on the last night before the crucifixion of Jesus Christ, emphasising Jesus' love for his disciples, demonstrated in the service of washing their feet, and his commandment that they love one another in the same way. The gospel identifies an unnamed "disciple whom Jesus loved" as its source and possible author. Early Christian tradition uniformly affirmed that John composed this Gospel.

== Text ==
The original text was written in Koine Greek. This chapter is divided into 38 verses. Some early manuscripts containing the text of this chapter in Greek are:

- Papyrus 75 (AD 175–225)
- Papyrus 66 (~200)
- Codex Vaticanus (325–350)
- Codex Sinaiticus (330–360)
- Codex Bezae (~400)
- Codex Alexandrinus (400–440)
- Codex Ephraemi Rescriptus (~450; extant verses 8–38)
- Papyrus 92 (5th century; extant verses 15–17)

Another ancient manuscript containing parts of this chapter is Papyrus 6 (AD ~350; extant verses 1–2, 11–12) which is written in the Coptic language.

== Places ==
All the events recorded in this chapter and the succeeding chapters up to John 17 took place in Jerusalem. The precise location is not specified, but John 18:1 states that afterwards, "Jesus left with his disciples and crossed the Kidron Valley".

== Old Testament references ==
- John 13:18: Psalm 41:9–10

== Verses 1–3: the appointed hour ==
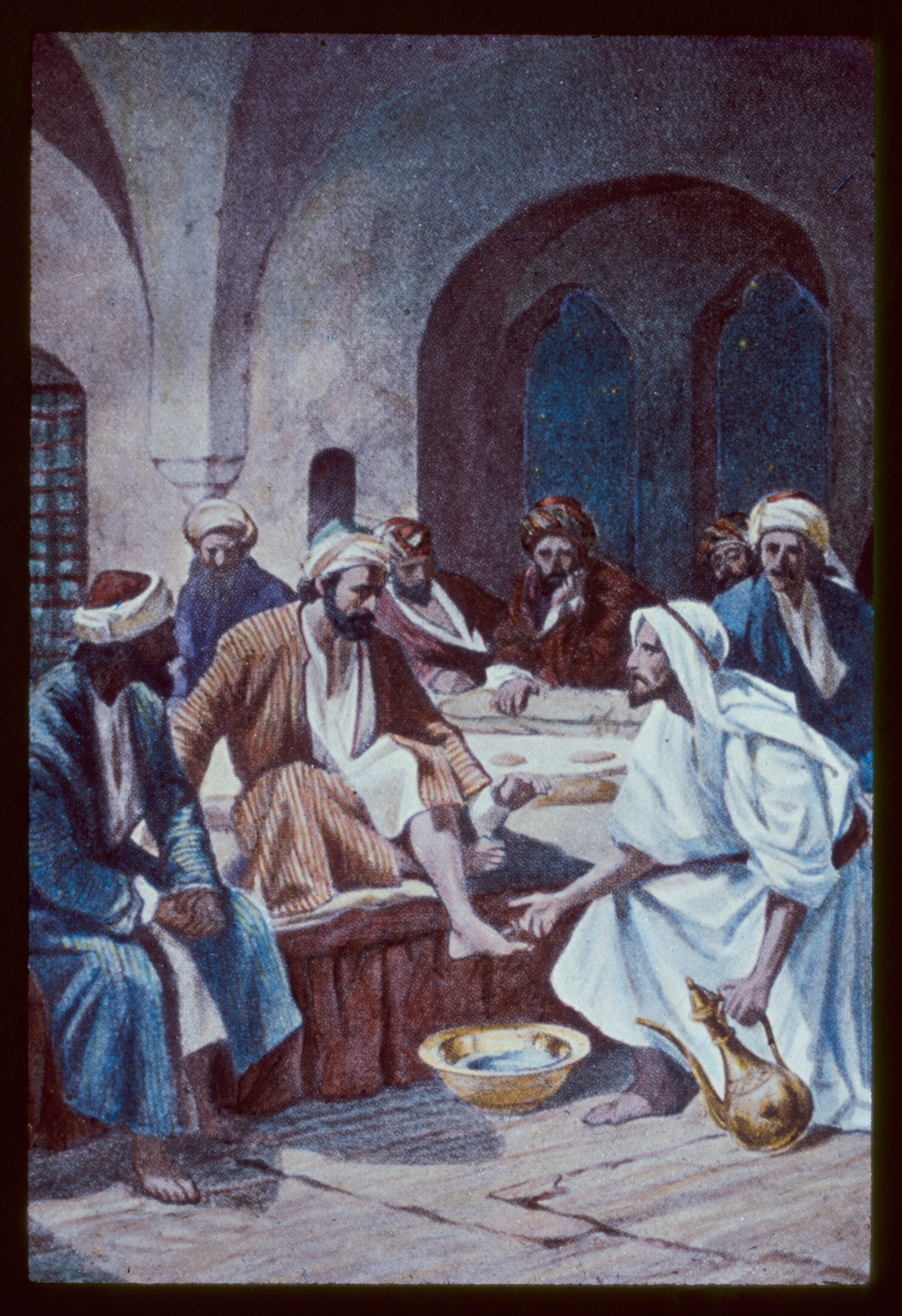
John 13:1–10: Jesus, with the twelve, partaketh of the passover feast in an upper chamber, washing the disciples' feet, by William Hole (1846–1917). G. Eric and Edith Matson Photograph Collection.

^{1} Now before the Feast of the Passover, when Jesus knew that His hour had come that He should depart from this world to the Father, having loved His own who were in the world, He loved them to the end. ^{2} And supper being ended, the devil having already put it into the heart of Judas Iscariot, Simon's son, to betray Him, ^{3} Jesus, knowing that the Father had given all things into His hands, and that He had come from God and was going to God.

Using the Greek syntax and theme perspective, evangelical scholar D. A. Carson regards verse 1 as an introduction to the whole 'Farewell Discourse', while verses 2 and 3 show the first demonstration of the full extent of Christ's love.

The narrative begins before the Feast of the Passover, when Jesus knew that His hour (Greek: η ωρα) had come that He should depart from this world to the Father, [when] having loved His own who were in the world, He loved them to the end. The appointed hour, anticipated earlier in the gospel (John 2:4 and 7:30), had now arrived. Jesus had announced publicly in John 12:23 that "the hour when the Son of Man should be glorified" had now arrived, and he had declined, in John 12:23, to ask his Father to "save [him] from this hour" (Greek: εκ της ωρας ταυτης).

Heinrich Meyer notes, "How long before the feast, our passage does not state", but Bengel's Gnomon and Wesley's Notes, which drew widely on Bengel, both associate this passage with the Wednesday of the week leading to the Passover. The New International Version translation says It was just before the Passover Festival.

Jesus' love for his own continued "to the end". Henry Alford takes this to mean "even to the end of his life in the flesh", and William D. Mounce refers to "the very end". However, Baptist writer Bob Utley notes that "this is the Greek word telos, which means an accomplished purpose. This refers to Jesus' work of redemption for humanity on the cross."

During or after supper, (Greek: δειπνου γενομενου, deipnou genomenou) the narrative explains that "Jesus knew that the Father had put all things under his power, and that he had come from God and was returning to God" (John 13:3). The King James Version speaks of "supper being ended" (John 13:2), whereas the American Standard Version says "during supper" and the New International Version has "the evening meal was in progress". There was still food to be shared at John 13:26, so the reading "after supper" sits less harmoniously with the passage as a whole. By this time, the devil had "already put it into the heart of Judas Iscariot, Simon’s son (Greek: ιουδα σιμωνος ισκαριωτου, Ioudas Simōnos Iskariōtou), to betray Him". Alfred Plummer, in the Cambridge Bible for Schools and Colleges argues that "the true reading of τοῦ διαβόλου ἤδη βεβληκότος εἰς τὴν καρδίαν (tou diabolou ēdē beblēkotos eis tēn kardian) gives us, "The devil having now put it into the heart, that Judas, Simon's son, Iscariot should betray Him", and asks "whose heart?" Grammatically, the meaning can be read as either "the heart of the devil" or "the heart of Judas", but the received reading (i.e. "the heart of Judas") is preferred and most English translations follow this reading. The Jerusalem Bible and J B Phillips' version both have "the mind of Judas".

== Jesus washes the disciples' feet (verses 4–17) ==
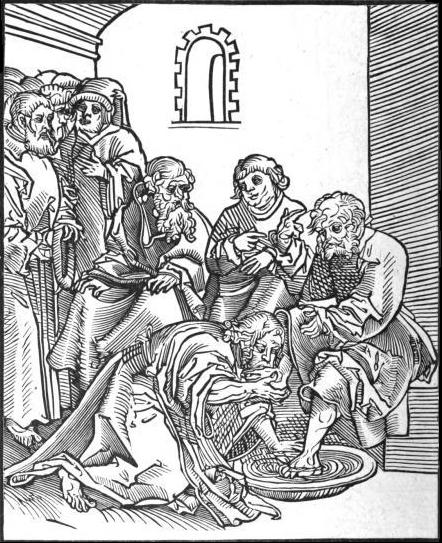
A woodcut of John 13:14–17, from Passionary of the Christ and Antichrist, by Lucas Cranach the Elder (1472–1553)

Jesus washes and dries the feet of each of his disciples. The evangelist "concentrates" on this narrative, providing a detailed account of the actions Jesus took, removing His outer garment and wrapping a towel around his waist. Scottish commentator William Robertson Nicoll says, "Each step in the whole astounding scene is imprinted on the mind of John". John 13:5 says that Jesus began to wash their feet: the washing was interrupted by Peter's initial refusal to allow Jesus to wash his feet, but John 13:12 suggests that the task was later completed and the feet of all the Disciples were washed, including those of Judas, as Jesus then took back His garments and reclined [at table] again.

The interruption consists of a question from Peter, "Lord (Greek: κυριε, Kyrie), are You washing my feet?", Jesus' reply that at present they would not understand what He was doing, Peter's refusal to have Jesus wash his feet, Jesus' reply that "If I do not wash you, you have no part with Me", Peter's willingness to have his whole body washed by Jesus, and Jesus' closing statement that "He who is bathed needs only to wash his feet, but is completely clean; and you are clean, but not all of you". The evangelist adds a note, "He knew who would betray Him; therefore He said, “You are not all clean" (John 13:6–10). Peter calls Jesus 'Lord' in two of his three statements, and Jesus later (John 13:13) acknowledges the title as correctly used.

From verse 12 onwards, the action having been completed, Jesus explains what he has done. Henry Alford calls the foot-washing "a pattern of self-denying love for His servants". Carson sees the episode pointing in two directions: one as a symbolic spiritual cleansing (John 13:8–10) and the other as a "standard of humble service", followed by a calling to the disciples to "wash one another's feet" (John 13:12–17). The words "Do you know what I have done to you?" (verse 12) are uttered to introduce Jesus' teaching, but without expectation of an answer.

== Jesus identifies his betrayer (verses 18–30) ==
=== Verse 18 ===
[Jesus says:] "I do not speak concerning all of you. I know whom I have chosen; but that the Scripture may be fulfilled, 'He who eats bread with Me has lifted up his heel against Me.'"

Jesus quotes the words of Psalm 41:9:

Even my close friend in whom I trusted, Who ate my bread, Has lifted up his heel against me.

in shorter statement: 'He who eats My bread has lifted up his heel against Me' (John 13:18 NASB).

According to the Pulpit Commentary, in the Psalm, "Ahithophel (who had been a counsellor to King David) is almost certainly intended", and Plummer notes that "the words of the Psalm are not a direct prediction, but the treachery and the fate of Ahithophel foreshadowed the treachery and the fate of Judas". The Jerusalem Bible translates John 13:18 as "Someone who shares my table rebels against me". Francis Moloney identifies this verse not only with Judas' betrayal of Jesus, but also with Peter's denial of Him (John 18:15–27).

=== Verse 19 ===
The evangelist reports Jesus saying, "I am telling you now before it happens, so that when it does happen you will believe that I am who I am". Indeed, the whole of John's Gospel is written so that [his readers] "may believe that Jesus is the Messiah, the Son of God, and that by believing [they] may have life in his name" (John 20:30). Jesus anticipates being betrayed by one of His friends (John 13:21), a consideration which He finds deeply troubling. The disciples cannot imagine who Jesus might be referring to, and ask "Lord, who is it?" (John 13:25). Jesus does not identify His betrayer by name, but provides an answer by sign:

=== Verse 23 ===
“One of his disciples—the one whom Jesus loved—was reclining next to him.”

The formal introduction of the Beloved Disciple is a “stunningly apparent” stroke of "narrative genius", for he is introduced immediately after Jesus demonstrates his love for the disciples in the act of washing the disciples' feet (John 13:1–20) and immediately before the commandment to “love one another just as I have loved you” (John 13:34). The framing device places the Beloved Disciple at "center stage", highlighting his importance in the Gospel and his special relationship with Jesus. His position next to Jesus (literally, the one “who is in the bosom of Jesus”, John 13:23) describes not only his proximity to Jesus at the supper but also his "closest communion" with him.

=== Verse 26 ===
"It is he to whom I shall give a piece of bread when I have dipped it." And having dipped the bread, He gave it to Judas Iscariot, the son of Simon.

The word in Greek: βάψας (bapsas, "dipped"), appears only once in the New Testament, here. The text refers to "the piece" or "morsel" or "sop" of bread (Greek: τὸ ψωμίον, to psómion), and Nicoll states that "some argue from the insertion of the article τὸ that this was the sop made up of a morsel of lamb, a small piece of unleavened bread, and dipped in the bitter sauce, which was given by the head of the house to each guest as a regular part of the Passover; and that therefore John as well as the Synoptists considered this to be the Paschal Supper. But not only is the article doubtful, it is an ordinary Oriental custom for the host to offer such a tid-bit to any favoured guest; and we are rather entitled to see in the act the last appeal to Judas’ better feeling. The very mark Jesus chooses to single him out is one which on ordinary occasions was a mark of distinctive favour".

=== Verse 27 ===
As soon as Judas took the bread, Satan entered into him. So Jesus told him, "What you are about to do, do quickly."

The wording is comparative: do more quickly: hasten. The Evangelical Heritage Version (2019) adopts this wording. Meyer suggests that Jesus now wishes to surmount this final crisis "as soon as possible": his "resigned, characteristic decision of mind brooks no delay".

=== Verse 29 ===
For some thought, because Judas had the money box, that Jesus had said to him, “Buy those things we need for the feast,” or that he should give something to the poor.

John's Gospel is the only one which observes that Judas was responsible for the disciples' "common fund" or "money box", both in John 12:6 and again here. The word γλωσσοκομον (glōssokomon) "means literally "a case for mouthpieces" of musical instruments, and hence any portable chest. It occurs in the Septuagint texts of 2 Chronicles 24:8,11.

=== Verse 30 ===
Having received the piece of bread, he then went out immediately. And it was night.

Judas left immediately, and of his own free will. Nicoll suggests that "[he took] the purse with him no doubt". After his departure, Jesus provides no further explanation to address the disciples' question. Instead, the evangelist moves the narrative forward. It is now night-time (Tzet Hakochavim) and therefore the day of the Passover has begun.

== The New Commandment (verses 31–35) ==
As soon as Judas had gone out, the spirit of Jesus rose. The discourse which Jesus commences after his departure, "the solemn valedictory discourse of our Lord", begins with three topics:

=== Verses 31–32 ===
"Now the Son of Man is glorified, and God is glorified in Him. If God is glorified in Him, God will also glorify Him in Himself, and glorify Him immediately."

=== Verse 33 ===
Little children, I shall be with you a little while longer. You will seek Me; and as I said to the Jews, ‘Where I am going, you cannot come,’ so now I say to you."

Jesus has said to the Jews, Where I am going, you cannot come, so now he says [the same] to his disciples.

=== Verses 34–35 ===
"A new commandment I give to you, that you love one another; as I have loved you, that you also love one another. By this all will know that you are My disciples, if you have love for one another"

== Jesus predicts Peter’s denial (verses 36–38) ==
"Judas is already beginning that series of events which will end in sending Jesus away from them to the Father". Just as Judas had left "immediately", (Greek: ευθεως, eutheōs) so the glorification of God begins "immediately" (Greek: ευθυς, euthys). Maclaren identifies three forms of glorification presented here:

- the Son of Man is glorified in His Cross
- God is glorified in the Son of Man
- the Son of Man is glorified in the Father.

The evangelist then has Jesus address his disciples as Greek: Τεκνία (teknia, "little children") - a word frequently used by John in his first epistle but not used elsewhere in this gospel. Many commentators note the tenderness of this word. Theologian Harold Buls suggests "it denotes endearment. It likely also indicates the disciples' immaturity and weakness". Jesus tells his disciples that shortly He will be leaving them; where He is going they cannot come (John 13:33), or at any rate they "cannot follow now, but ... will follow later" (John 13:36). The apostles Peter (in verse 37), Thomas and Philip (in the next chapter) raise questions about where Jesus is going. Peter seems to have recognised the connection between following Jesus and dying: "Lord, why can I not follow you now? I will lay down my life for you" or "on your behalf". Jesus questions whether Peter will lay down his life for Him and tells him that in fact he will have denied Jesus three times "before the rooster crows" (John 13:38, cf. John 18:27).

In Luke's Gospel (Luke 22:34) the prediction of Peter's denial also takes place within the room where they had been eating, whereas in Matthew 26:31–35 and Mark 11:27–31, "the announcement of Peter's fate is made on the way to the Garden of Gethsemane".

== See also ==
- Farewell Discourse
- Jerusalem
- Jesus Christ
- Judas Iscariot
- Old Testament messianic prophecies quoted in the New Testament
- Simon Peter
- Other related Bible parts: Psalm 41, Matthew 26, Mark 14, Luke 22

== Bibliography ==
- Carson, D. A. (1990). The Gospel according to John. Pillar New Testament Commentary Series. Eerdmans, William B. Publishing Company. ISBN 9780802836830.

Preceded by John 12	Chapters of the Bible; Gospel of John	Succeeded by John 14
