= John 15 =

- ← chapter 14 chapter 16 →
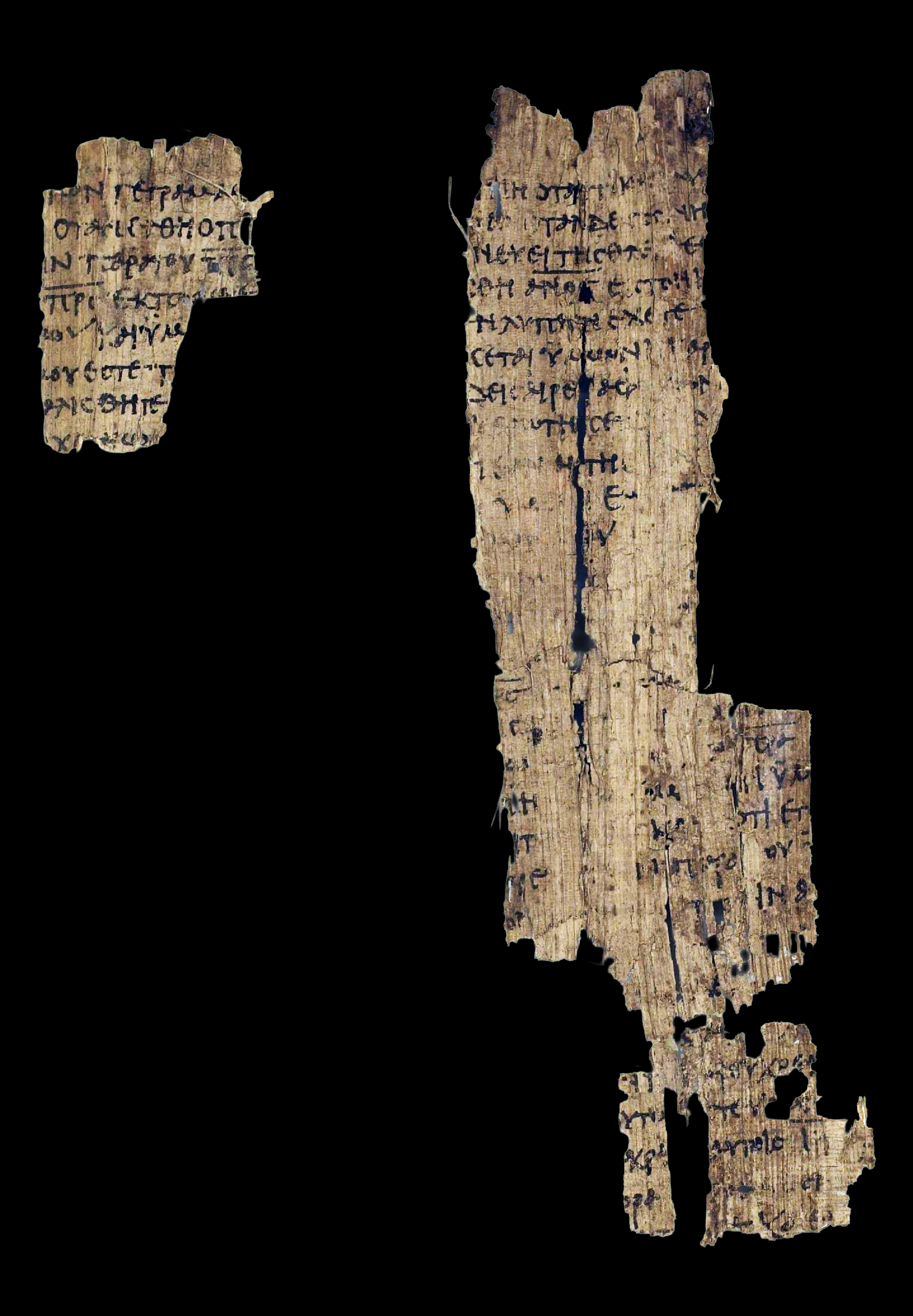
- John 15:25-16:2 on the recto side of Papyrus 22, written about AD 250
- Book: Gospel of John
- Category: Gospel
- Christian Bible part: New Testament
- Order in the Christian part: 4

John 15 is the fifteenth chapter in the Gospel of John in the New Testament section of the Christian Bible. It is part of what Christian Bible scholars have called the 'farewell discourse' of Jesus. It has historically been a source of Christian teaching and Christological debate and reflection, and its images (particularly of Jesus as the vine) have been influential in Christian art and iconography. The chapter implies one of the highest and most developed Christologies to be found in the New Testament. The original text was written in Koine Greek. The gospel identifies an unnamed "disciple whom Jesus loved" as its source and possible author. Early Christian tradition uniformly affirmed that John composed this Gospel.

== Text ==
The original text was written in Koine Greek. This chapter is divided into 27 verses.

=== Textual witnesses ===
Some early manuscripts containing the text of this chapter are: (Note: The extant Codex Ephraemi Rescriptus does not have this chapter due to lacuna.)

- Codex Vaticanus (325–350; complete)
- Codex Sinaiticus (330–360; complete)
- Codex Bezae (~400; complete)
- Codex Alexandrinus (400–440; complete)

== Old Testament references ==
- John 15:25: Psalm 35:19b; Psalm 69:4.

== Places ==
The events and discourses recorded in this chapter and in the whole of chapters 13 to 17 took place in Jerusalem. The precise location is not specified, but John 18:1 states that afterwards, "Jesus left with his disciples and crossed the Kidron Valley". Because the previous chapter ends with the words "Come now, let us go", Plummer, in the Cambridge Bible for Schools and Colleges, suggests that Jesus and his disciples have "rise[n] from table and prepare[d] to depart, but that the contents of the next three chapters (15-17) are spoken before they leave the room".

== Analysis ==
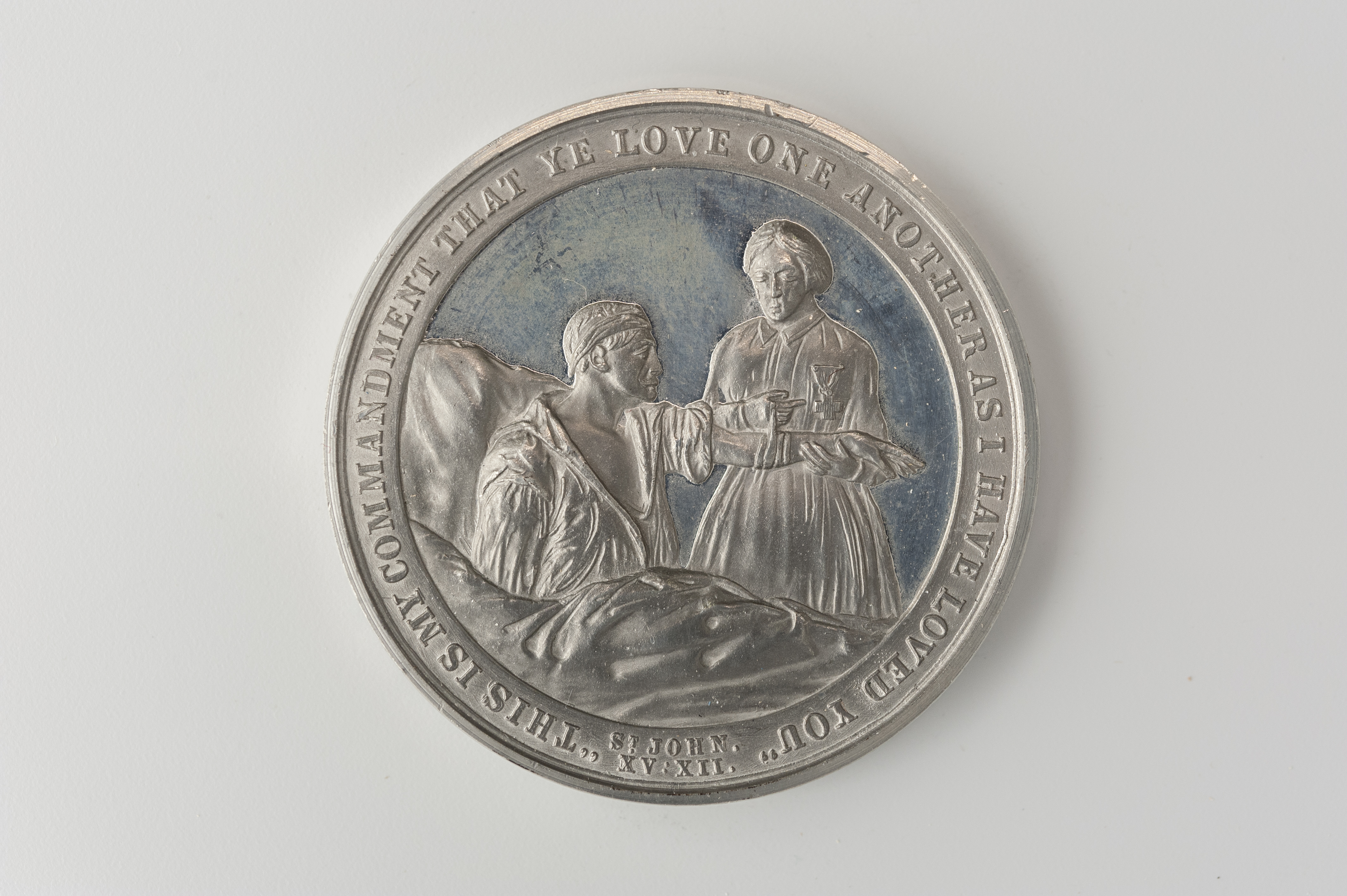
John 15:12 quoted on a medal: "This is my commandment, That ye love one another, as I have loved you."

The chapter presents Jesus speaking in the first person. Although ostensibly addressing his disciples, most scholars conclude the chapter was written with events concerning the later church in mind. Jesus is presented as explaining the relationship between himself and his followers, seeking to model this relationship on his own relationship with his Father. Swedish-based commentator René Kieffer separates this "second" part of Jesus' farewell discourse from the first part (chapter 13 from verse 31 onwards, and chapter 14), suggesting that this part is "timeless", perhaps a later insertion, rather than being concerned with Jesus' impending departure from his disciples.

The chapter introduces the extended metaphor of Christ as the True Vine: his Father is the vinedresser, vinegrower or husbandman. His disciples are said to be branches (Greek: τα κληματα, ta klémata, specifically meaning vine branches) which must 'abide' in him if they are to 'bear fruit'. The disciples are warned that barren branches are pruned by the vinedresser: see John 15:2: Every branch that does bear fruit is pruned so that it will bear more fruit - not barren branches.

The chapter proceeds by comparing the close relationship of Jesus and his disciples ('abiding', John 15:9–10) to that of himself and his Father. The disciples are reminded of the love of the Father and the Son, and the love of the Son for the disciples, and then exhorted to 'love one another' in the same manner. John 15:13 speaks of the 'greater love' as being the willingness to 'lay down' one's life for friends. This text, which primarily refers to Jesus’ impending death, has since been widely used to affirm the sacrifice of martyrs and soldiers in war, and is thus often seen on war memorials and graves.

Jesus then speaks of being hated by the world (John 15:18–25), but he sees this hatred as fulfillment of the words in either Psalm 69, "They hated Me without a cause", or Psalm 35, "neither let them wink with the eye that hate me without a cause".

The chapter concludes with Jesus warning his disciples to expect persecution, they will also persecute you, and promising the gift of the parakletos (paraclete, or Holy Spirit).

== Verse 3 ==
Already you are clean because of the word that I have spoken to you.

In the New American Bible Revised Edition the wording offered is "You are already pruned ...", following on from the reference to pruning in verse 2. Since the "cleansing" of a believer is secured through baptism, Augustine asks, "Why does [Jesus] not say, ye are clean by reason of the baptism wherewith ye are washed? Because it is the word in the water which cleanseth. Take away the word, and what is the water, but water? Add the word to the element, and you have a sacrament."

== Verse 4 ==
Abide in Me, and I in you. As the branch cannot bear fruit of itself, unless it abides in the vine, neither can you, unless you abide in Me.

The words μένῃ (menē) or μείνατε (meinate) appear frequently in this chapter. Some early texts have μένητε (menēte): considering "the divided state" of the manuscript evidence, there in no certainty about whether μείνατε or μένητε is original. Typical translations are "abide", "remain", or "continue". Heinrich Meyer refers to "faithful persistence".

== Verse 9 ==
As the Father loved Me, I also have loved you; abide in My love.

Pope Francis suggests that here, "Jesus tells us something new about love: you are not only to love, but to abide in my love. In fact, the Christian vocation is to abide in God’s love".

== Verse 13 ==
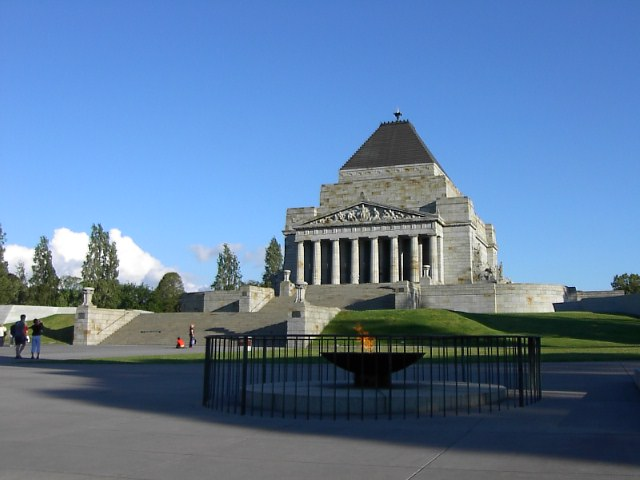
The Shrine of Remembrance in Melbourne, Australia

Greater love has no one than this, than to lay down one's life for his friends.

The Shrine of Remembrance in Melbourne, Australia, (pictured) is typical of thousands of war memorials around the world which use the words of this verse, "no greater love" in their tribute to those who have fallen in war. There is no intention here to emphasise "friends" as if suffering for friends is a greater good than suffering for strangers or enemies.

== Verse 16 ==
"You did not choose Me, but I chose you and appointed you that you should go and bear fruit, and that your fruit should remain, that whatever you ask the Father in My name He may give you".

The word "appointed" is translated as "ordained" in the King James Version and some other translations. Referring to the allegory of trees which have been planted, the reformation theologian Sebastian Castellio suggests destinavi, "I have marked out, or assigned you your place", as an alternative reading.

== Verse 17 ==
"I demand that you love each other"

Most English translations state this verse as Jesus' "commandment" to his disciples. Jesus speaks twice of this commandment in this chapter, in verses 12 and 17.

== The hatred of the world: verses 18-25 ==
These verses speak of the world's hatred for the disciples. Meyer makes the contents personal to the disciples: Jesus directs them now on "their relation to the world", calling the world's hatred a "community of destiny" with his own. In the next chapter, Jesus explains why he has told the disciples these things:

These things have I told you, that when the time shall come, ye may remember that I told you of them.

== Verse 26 ==
“But when the Helper comes, whom I shall send to you from the Father, the Spirit of truth who proceeds from the Father, He will testify of Me".

The reference to the Spirit in verse 26, speaks of it as sent by the Son from the Father. This verse has been particularly influential in debates concerning the nature of the Trinity and in the filioque disputes between Eastern and Western Christianity.

== See also ==
- True Vine

== Bibliography ==
- Bultmann, Rudolf (1971), The Gospel of John, Blackwell
- Kirkpatrick, A. F. (1901). The Book of Psalms: with Introduction and Notes. The Cambridge Bible for Schools and Colleges. Vol. Book IV and V: Psalms XC-CL. Cambridge: At the University Press.
- Linders, Barnabas (1972), The Gospel of John, Marshall Morgan and Scott

Preceded by John 14	Chapters of the Bible; Gospel of John	Succeeded by John 16
