= Papyrus 108 =

Copy of the New Testament in Greek

- New Testament manuscript
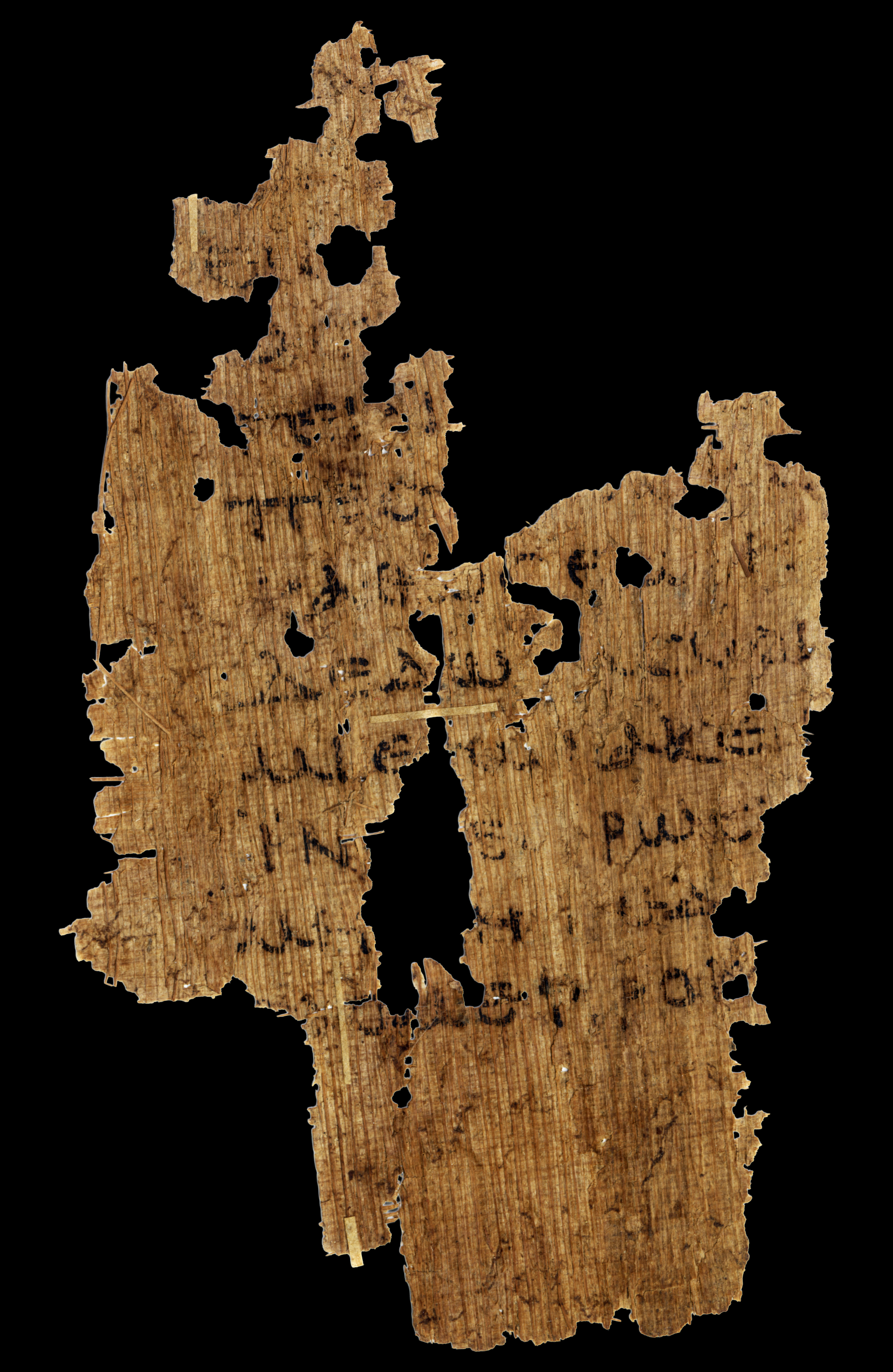
- Recto, John 17:23-24
- Name: P. Oxy. 4447
- Sign: 𝔓^{108}
- Text: Gospel of John 17:23-24; 18:1-5
- Date: 2nd / 3rd century
- Script: Greek
- Found: Oxyrhynchus, Egypt
- Now at: Sackler Library
- Cite: W. E. H. Cockle, OP LXV (1998), pp. 16-18
- Size: 10.5 x 6.2 cm
- Type: Alexandrian text-type
- Note: concurs with א

Papyrus 108 is a copy of the New Testament in Greek. It is a papyrus manuscript of the Gospel of John, containing verses 17:23-24 (the end of the Farewell Discourse) and 18:1-5 in a fragmentary condition. It is designated by the siglum 𝔓^{108} in the Gregory-Aland numbering of New Testament manuscripts. Using the study of comparartive writing styles (paleography), it has been assigned to the late 2nd or early 3rd Century CE. The manuscript is currently housed at the Papyrology Rooms (P. Oxy. 4447) of the Sackler Library at Oxford University.

== Description ==
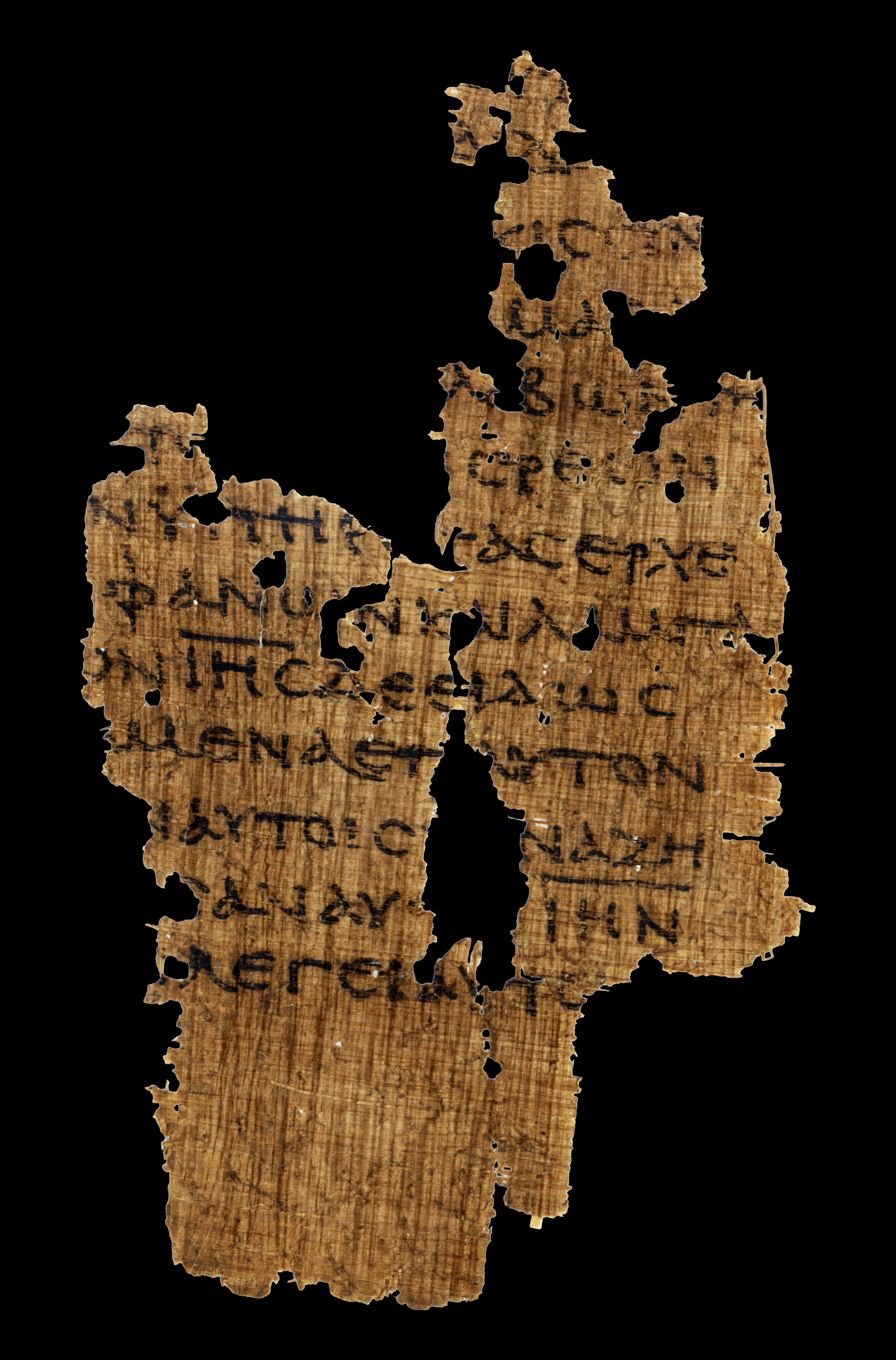
Verso, John 18:1-5

The original manuscript would've been around 14.5 cm x 18.5 cm is size, with 23 lines per page. The handwriting script is representative of the reformed Documentary style. The text is considered a representative of the Alexandrian text-type. Although small, the manuscript concurs with Codex Sinaiticus. It has itacistic error in John 17:23 (γεινωσκη instead of γινωσκη).

Some notable readings

Below taken from NA27 Edition Apparatus.

John 17:24 (1)

δεδωκας : 𝔓^{108} 𝔓^{60} 𝔓^{66} א B C D
εδωκας : A

John 17:24 (2)

κακεινοι : 𝔓^{108} 𝔓^{60}^{(vid)} 𝔓^{66} א B C D $\mathfrak{M}$
και εκεινοι : A

John 17:24 (3)

εδωκας : 𝔓^{108} B K N Γ Θ 209 al; Cl
δεδωκας : א A C D

John 18:2 (1)

ι̅η̅ς̅ (ιησους) : 𝔓^{108} 𝔓^{59} 𝔓^{60} 𝔓^{66} א B L pc
ο ι̅η̅ς̅ (ιησους) : A C D W Θ Ψ 0250 ƒ^{13} 33 $\mathfrak{M}$
και ο ι̅η̅ς̅ (ιησους) : Γ Δ 892^{s} al

John 18:2 (2)

εκει μετα των μαθητων αυτου : 𝔓^{108} 𝔓^{66}^{c} א A C D W $\mathfrak{M}$
μετα των μαθητων αυτου εκει : B
εκει μετα των μαθητων : 𝔓^{66}*

John 18:3

και φαρισαιων : 𝔓^{108}^{(vid)} א^{1} A C W Θ Ψ 0250 ƒ^{13} 33 $\mathfrak{M}$
και εκ των φαρισαιων : א*^{,2} D L 579 pc a aur
και των φαρισαιων : B 0140

John 18:4 (1)

δε : 𝔓^{108} א D L W f^{1} 33 565 pc it sy^{p} co
ουν : 𝔓^{60}^{(vid)} A B C Θ Ψ 0250 $\mathfrak{M}$ aurc e vg sy^{h}

John 18:4 (2)

ειδως : 𝔓^{108} א L W ƒ^{1} $\mathfrak{M}$
ιδως : A C
ειδων : D

John 18:4 (3)

εξελθων ειπεν : 𝔓^{108}^{(vid)} א A C^{3} L W Θ Ψ 0250 ƒ^{13} 33 $\mathfrak{M}$
εξηλθεν και λεγει : B C^{*} D ƒ^{1} 565 pc lat
εξηλθεν εξω και λεγει : 𝔓^{60}

== See also ==
- List of New Testament papyri
- Oxyrhynchus Papyri
- Gospel of John: chapter 17, 18
