= Farewell Discourse =

Discourse of Jesus described in the Gospel of John

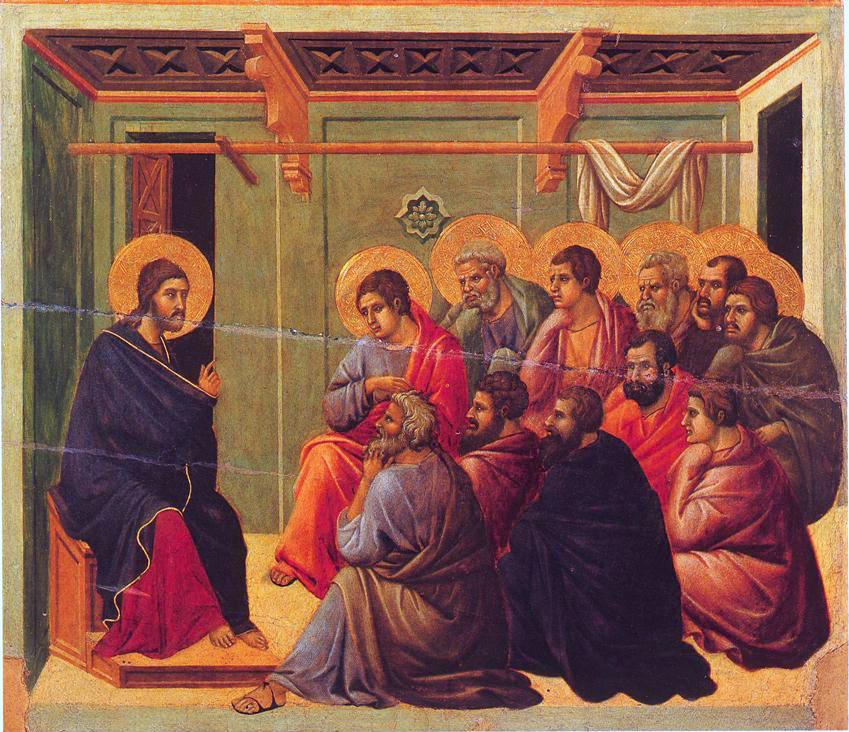
Jesus saying farewell to his eleven remaining disciples, from the Maesta by Duccio, 1308–1311

In the New Testament, chapters 14–17 of the Gospel of John are known as the Farewell Discourse given by Jesus to eleven of his disciples immediately after the conclusion of the Last Supper in Jerusalem, the night before his crucifixion.

The discourse is generally seen as having distinct components. First, Jesus tells the disciples that he will be going away to the Father, and that he will send the Holy Spirit to guide the disciples. Jesus bestows peace on the disciples and commands them to love one another. The expression of the unity of love between Jesus and his Father, in the Spirit, as it applies to his disciples in the love of Christ, is a key theme in the discourse, manifested by several reiterations of the New Commandment: "love one another as I have loved you".

The next part of the discourse contains the allegory of the True Vine which positions Jesus as the vine (the source of life for the world) and the disciples as the branches, building on the pattern of discipleship in the gospels. The Vine again emphasizes the love among the disciples, but Jesus then warns the disciples of upcoming persecutions: "If the world hates you, remember that they hated me before you". "I have told you these things, so that in me you may have peace. In this world you will have trouble. But take heart! I have overcome the world" (John 16:33).

In the final part of the discourse (John 17:1-26) Jesus prays for his followers. This is the longest prayer of Jesus in any of the gospels, and is known as the Farewell Prayer or the High Priestly Prayer. The key themes of the prayer are the glorification of the Father and petitions for the unity of the disciples through love. Jesus prays to the Father that his followers "may all be one as we are one" and that "the love with which you love me may be in them, and I in them".

== Structure and overview ==
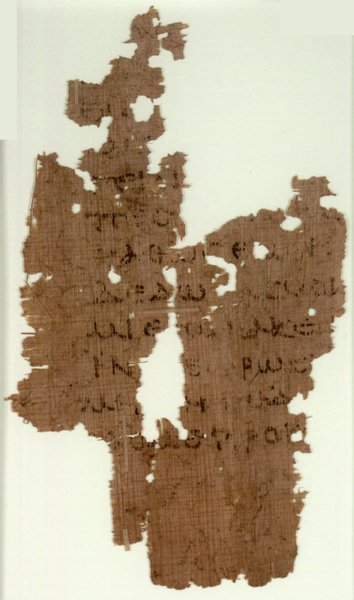
Papyrus 108 (second or third century) containing John 17:23–24 from the end of the Farewell Discourse

Although chapters 13 to 17 of John may be viewed as a larger unit, most of chapter 13 may be viewed as a preparation for the farewell, and the farewell prayer in chapter 17 as its conclusion.

The discourse is preceded by 13:31–38 (just after Judas leaves the last supper), in which Jesus gives the remaining eleven disciples the New Commandment to "love one another" and predicts Peter's denial of knowing him during his upcoming crucifixion.

The discourse may be separated into four components:

- First discourse: 14:1–31, The theme of this part is departure and return; peace and joy, and is similar to the third discourse. Jesus states that he will be going to the Father, but will send the "Comforter" for the disciples
- Second discourse: 15:1–17. This part is also called the Vine and deals with Jesus' love and how Jesus is the source of life for the community. At the end of this, it leads to the discussion of the world's hatred in the next section.
- Third discourse: 15:18–16:33. This section again deals with Jesus' departure and the Comforter which will come to the disciples; and contrasts Jesus' love with the world's hatred.
- The "Farewell Prayer": 17:1–26. Here Jesus submits five specific petitions to the Father as he prays for his disciples and the community of followers.

However, this four part structure is not subject to universal agreement among scholars, and at times, the third part is assumed to start at beginning of chapter 16 of John. Some scholars use a three part structure in which chapters 15 and 16 form one unit.

The statement "these things I have spoken to you" occurs several times throughout the discourse, and emphasizes that the words of farewell spoken by Jesus are not to be forgotten. The statement "while I am still with you" then also underscores the importance of the final instructions given.

This discourse is rich with Christological content, e.g. it reiterates the Pre-existence of Christ in John 17:5 when Jesus refers to the glory which he had with the Father "before the world was".

== Four elements of the discourse ==
=== Part 1: My peace I give unto you ===
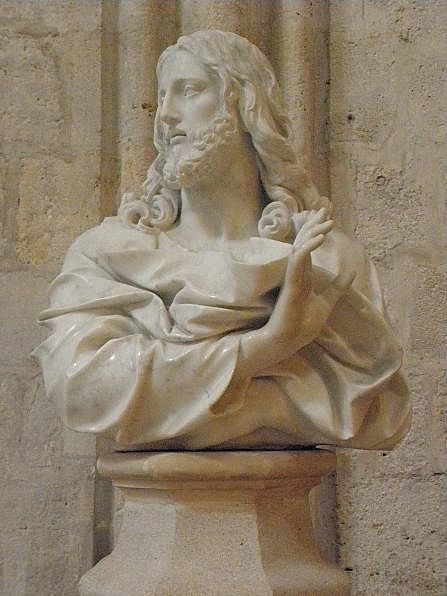
Statue of Jesus giving his blessing, Notre-Dame Cathedral, Paris

The three components here are:

- Jesus says that he will go to the Father and reasserts his divine relationship with him (14:1–14)
- Commandment of love, and the arrival of the Holy Spirit (14:15–24)
- Jesus bestows peace and reassures the disciples not be fearful (14:25–31)

At the start of this part Jesus tells the disciples that he will go to the Father, causing them to be nervous about his departure. Yet he assures them that he will "go to prepare a place" for them in his Father's house and that they know that the way there is through him. "I am the way, and the truth, and the life: no one cometh unto the Father, but by me" (14:6) identifies Jesus as the only path to the Father, which then formed part of the teachings in the early Christian community (see Acts 4:12) Jesus then asserts his unity with the Father in John 14:7-9:

"If you know me, then you will also know my Father" and "Whoever has seen me has seen the Father".

The statement in John 14:11 "I am in the Father, and the Father in me" further asserts the special relationship of Jesus and the father.

The statement in John 14:26: "the Holy Spirit, whom the Father will send in my name" is within the framework of the "sending relationships" in John's gospel. In John 9:4 (and also 14:24) Jesus refers to the father as "him that sent me", and in John 20:21 states "as the Father hath sent me, even so send I you" where he sends the disciples. In John 15:26 Jesus also sends the Spirit: "whom I will send unto you from the Father, [even] the Spirit of truth... shall bear witness of me" In John's gospel, the Father is never sent; he is "the sender" of both Jesus and the Holy Spirit. The Spirit is never the sender, but is sent by the Father and Jesus (however, see Filioque controversy) .

The bestowing of peace by Jesus in 14:27 specifically contrasts it with "worldly peace" by stating:

"Peace I leave with you; my peace I give unto you: not as the world giveth, give I unto you."

Koestenberger argues that this was likely to contrast the "Heavenly peace" of Jesus with attempts at worldly peace at the time such as the Pax Romana instituted by Emperor Augustus. The use of the word peace (eirene in Greek) is rare in John's Gospel, and apart from one other case in the Farewell Discourse (16:33), it is only used by the resurrected Jesus in John 20:19–26.

=== Part 2: I am the vine, you the branches ===
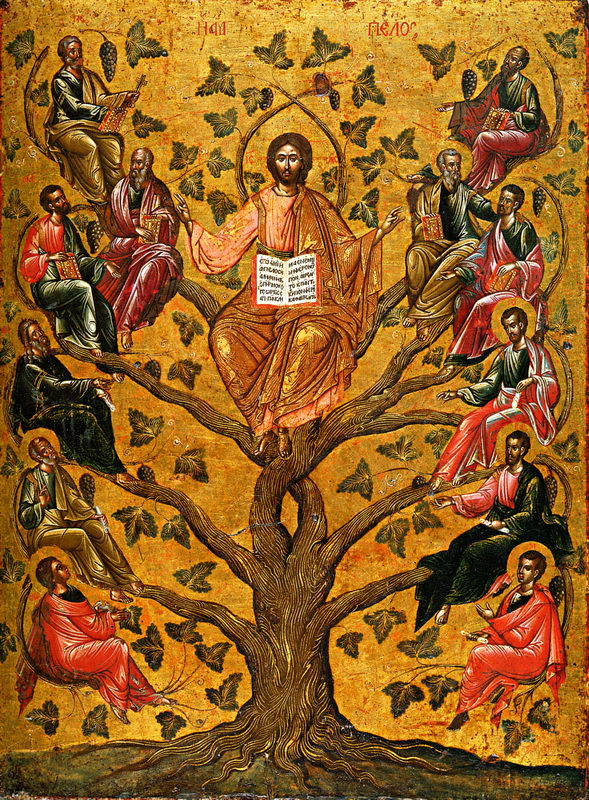
Christ the True Vine, 16th-century Greek icon

This part is a meditation on Jesus as the source of life for the community and builds on the pattern of discipleship in the gospels.

In the beginning Jesus states: "I am the true vine", leading to the use of the term The Vine to refer to this teaching. The disciples are then referred to as the branches that depend on the vine:

"I am the vine, ye are the branches: He that abideth in me, and I in him, the same beareth much fruit: for apart from me ye can do nothing." – John 15:5

The passages in John 15:9–10 then draw parallels between the relationship between Jesus and the disciples with that of The Father and Jesus:

"as the Father hath loved me, I also have loved you"

"keep my commandments ... as I have kept my Father's commandments".

Later in the discourse, this pattern is repeated in John 17:18 in which Jesus "sends the disciples to the world", just as the Father had sent him to the world.

This pattern of discipleship reemphasizes the Good Shepherd teachings in John 10:1–21 in which one "lays down his life" in obedience.

And Jesus now refers to his disciples as friends:

"Ye are my friends, if ye do the things which I command you." – John 15:14

This component of the discourse again ends in 15:17 by reiterating the importance of love: "These things I command you, that ye may love one another."

=== Part 3: If the world hates you ===
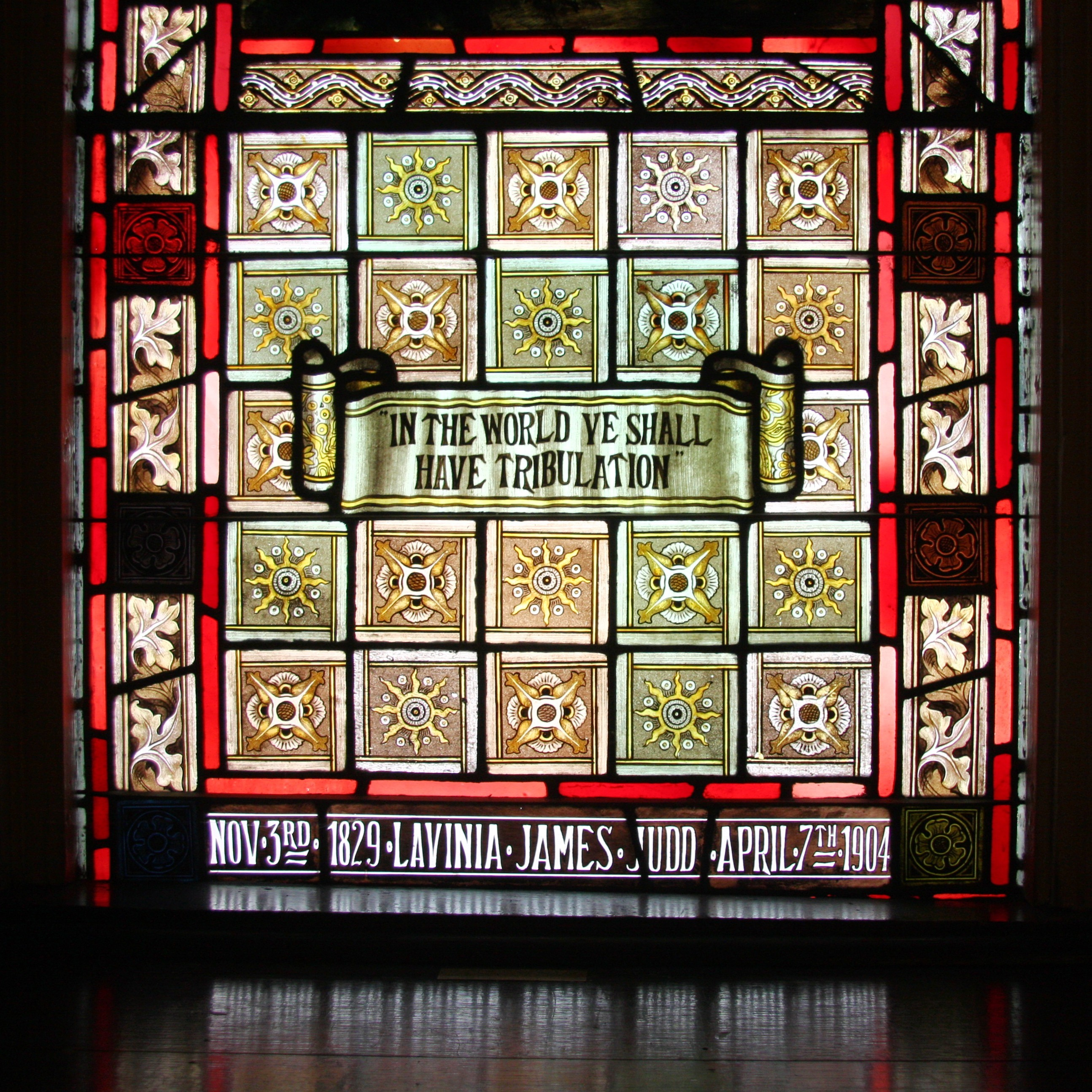
Stained glass window with a quote from the Farewell Discourse: "In the world ye shall have tribulation."

In John 15:18–16:33 Jesus prepares his disciples for conflict and hatred by the world, reminding them he had also faced adversity:

"If the world hates you, you know that it had hated me before [it hated] you." ... "They hated me without a cause."

Warning the disciples of coming persecutions he says:

"If they persecuted me, they will also persecute you"

This again draws parallels between Jesus and his disciples, as had been drawn earlier in the discourse. In the First Epistle of John (3:13) the brethren are reminded of this again: "Marvel not, brethren, if the world hateth you". Drawing parallels again, Jesus states in John 15:23:

"He that hateth me hateth my Father also"

But Jesus comforts the disciples by assuring them that he will send the "Spirit of Truth" to bear his witness:

"But when the Comforter is come, whom I will send unto you from the Father, [even] the Spirit of truth, which proceedeth from the Father, he shall bear witness of me"

And Jesus adds that unless he departs the Holy Spirit will not arrive, and indicates that the continuation of his work in the world will be carried out by the Holy Spirit.

Jesus also assures the disciples of the love of the Father for them, again drawing parallels:

"Father himself loveth you, because ye have loved me, and have believed that I came forth from the Father."

"In the world ye have tribulation: but be of good cheer; I have overcome the world."

After these statements, Jesus begins a series of prayers for the disciples.

=== Part 4: Farewell prayer ===
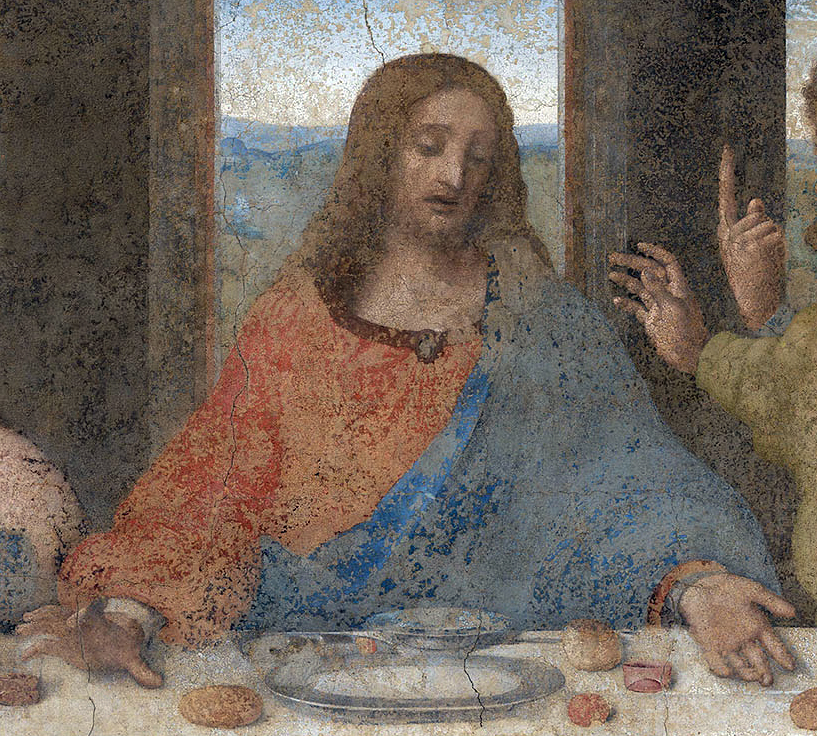
Jesus depicted in The Last Supper, by Leonardo da Vinci

John 17:1–26 is generally known as the Farewell Prayer or the High Priestly Prayer. It is by far the longest prayer of Jesus in any of the gospels. While the earlier parts of the discourse are addressed to the disciples, this final part addresses the Father, as Jesus turns his eyes to heaven and prays.

The prayer takes place at a unique time in the ministry of Jesus, at the end of his final instructions to his followers, and at the start of his Passion. Once the prayer has ended, the events of Jesus' Passion unfold rather quickly. In the prayer, for one last time Jesus gives an account of his earthly ministry to the Father and by praying to him reiterates his total dependence on the Father.

The prayer begins with Jesus' petition for his glorification by the Father, given that completion of his work and continues to an intercession for the success of the works of his disciples and the community of his followers.

A key theme of the prayer is the glorification of the Father. In the first part Jesus talks with the Father about their relationship, thus indirectly reiterating that to the disciples.

Then reflecting the nature of their relationship, Jesus asks the Father to glorify him as he has glorified the Father, as he had in his earthly ministry – referring to the theme of eternal life, stating in John 17:3:

"And this is life eternal, that they should know thee the only true God"

The Farewell Prayer consists of the following five petitions:

- 17:1–5: Petition for glorification based on the completion of his work
- 17:6–10: Petitions for his disciples
- 17:11–19: Petition for the preservation and sanctification of "his own" in the world
- 17:20–23: Petition for unity of "his own"
- 17:24–26: Petition for the union of "his own" with himself

The last two petitions are for unity, as characterized by:

"I have given them the glory that you gave me, that they may be one as we are one." – John 17:22

"I made known unto them thy name, and will make it known; that the love with which thou loves me may be in them, and I in them." – John 17:26

with the final petition being for the eternal unity of Jesus with his followers.

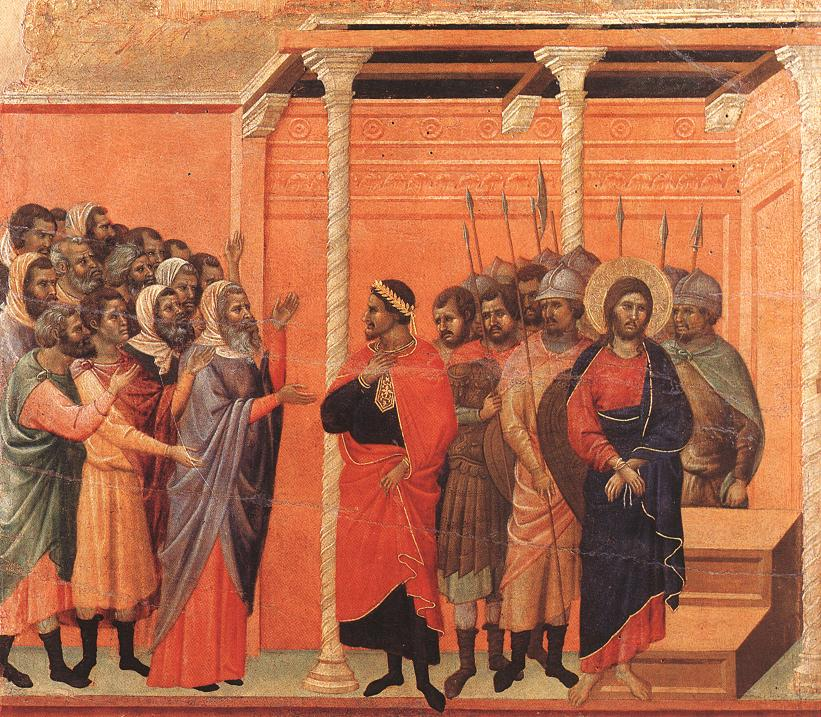
Jesus (on the right) being accused by the Pharisees, the day after the Last Supper, by Duccio

The references to "thy name" in John 17:6 and John 17:26 emphasize the importance of the name of God in Christianity, which in Christian teachings (e.g. by Cyril of Alexandria) has been seen as a representation of the entire system of "divine truth" revealed to the faithful "that believe on his name" as in John 1:12.

== Historicity ==
The Jesus Seminar has argued that verses John 14:30–31 represent a conclusion, and that the next three chapters have been inserted into the text later. This argument considers the Farewell Discourse not to be authentic, and postulates that it was constructed after the death of Jesus. Similarly, Stephen Harris has questioned the authenticity of the discourse because it appears only in the Gospel of John, and not in the Synoptic gospels. However, scholars such as Herman Ridderbos see John 14:30–31 as a "provisional ending" just to that part of the discourse and not an ending to the entire discourse.

Fernando Segovia has argued that the discourse originally consisted of just chapter 14, and the other chapters were added later, but Gary M. Burge opposes that argument given the overall theological and literary unity of the work and that the discourse has much in common with the gospel as a whole, e.g. the themes of Jesus' death and resurrection and his care for his own.

In 2004, Scott Kellum published a detailed analysis of the literary unity of the entire Farewell Discourse and stated that it shows that it was written by a single author, and that its structure and placement within the Gospel of John is consistent with the rest of that gospel.

== See also ==
- Bread of Life Discourse
- Five Discourses of Matthew
- Gospel of John: chapter 14, 15, 16, 17
- Life of Jesus in the New Testament
- Ministry of Jesus
- Water of Life Discourse
- Paraclete
