= Papyrus 60 =

New Testament papyrus fragment

Papyrus 𝔓^{60}
- New Testament manuscript
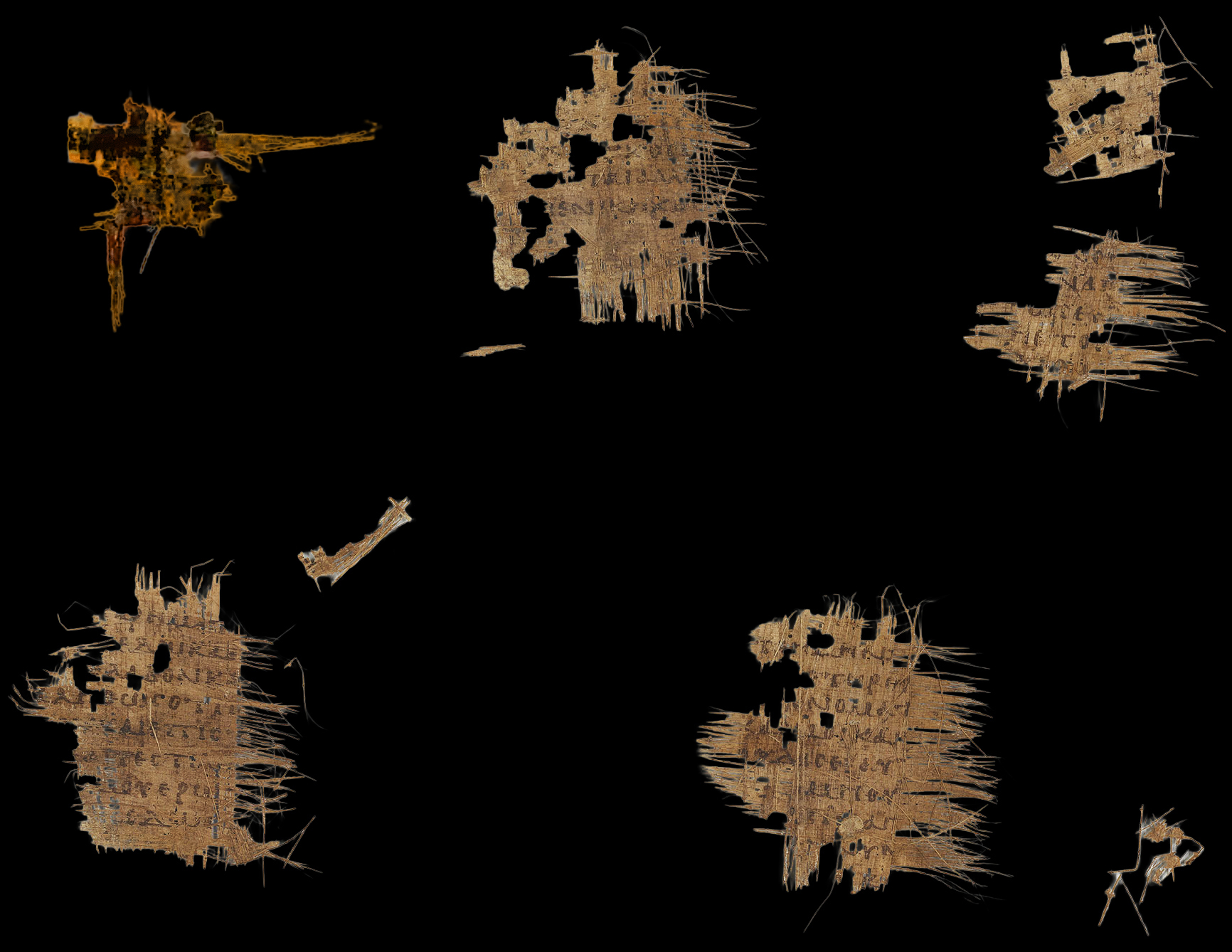
- Fragments 1-5 recto John 16:30; 16:33; 17:3-4; 17:8-9; 17:12-13
- Name: Papyrus Colt 4
- Text: John 16-19 †
- Date: ca. 700
- Script: Greek
- Found: Egypt
- Now at: The Morgan Library & Museum
- Cite: L. Casson, E.L. Hettich, Excavations at Nessana II, Literary Papyri (Princeton: 1946), pp. 94-111.
- Type: Alexandrian text-type
- Category: III

Papyrus 60 (in the Gregory-Aland numbering), signed by 𝔓^{60}, is a copy of the New Testament in Greek. It is a papyrus manuscript of the Gospel of John, it contains John 16:29-19:26.

The manuscript paleographically has been assigned to the sixth or seventh century.

The Greek text of this codex is a representative of the Alexandrian text-type. Kurt Aland placed it in Category III.

It is currently housed at the Morgan Library & Museum (P. Colt 4) in New York City.

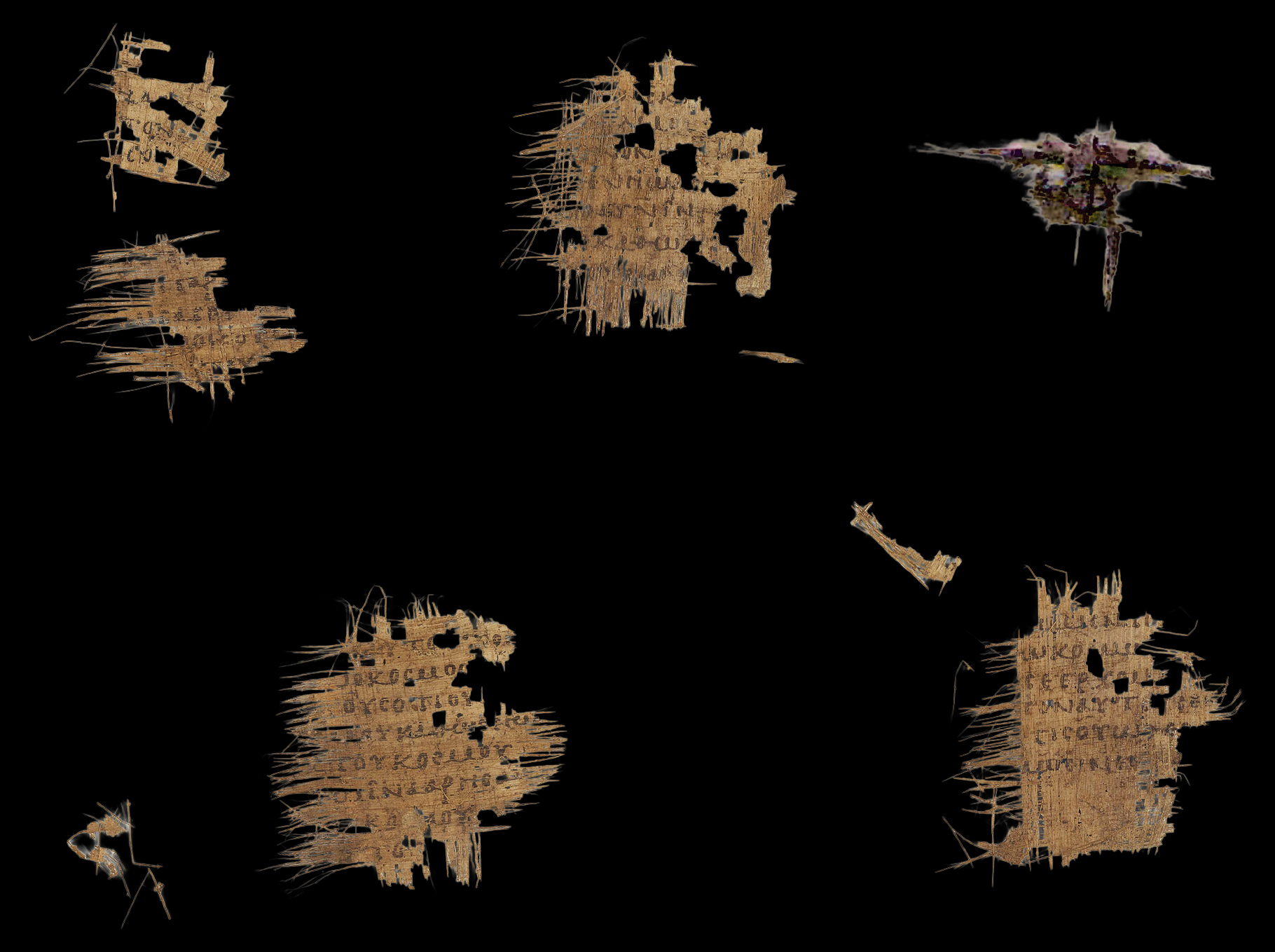
Fragments 1-5 verso, John 16:32; 16:17; 17:1; 17:5-6; 17:11; 17:14-15

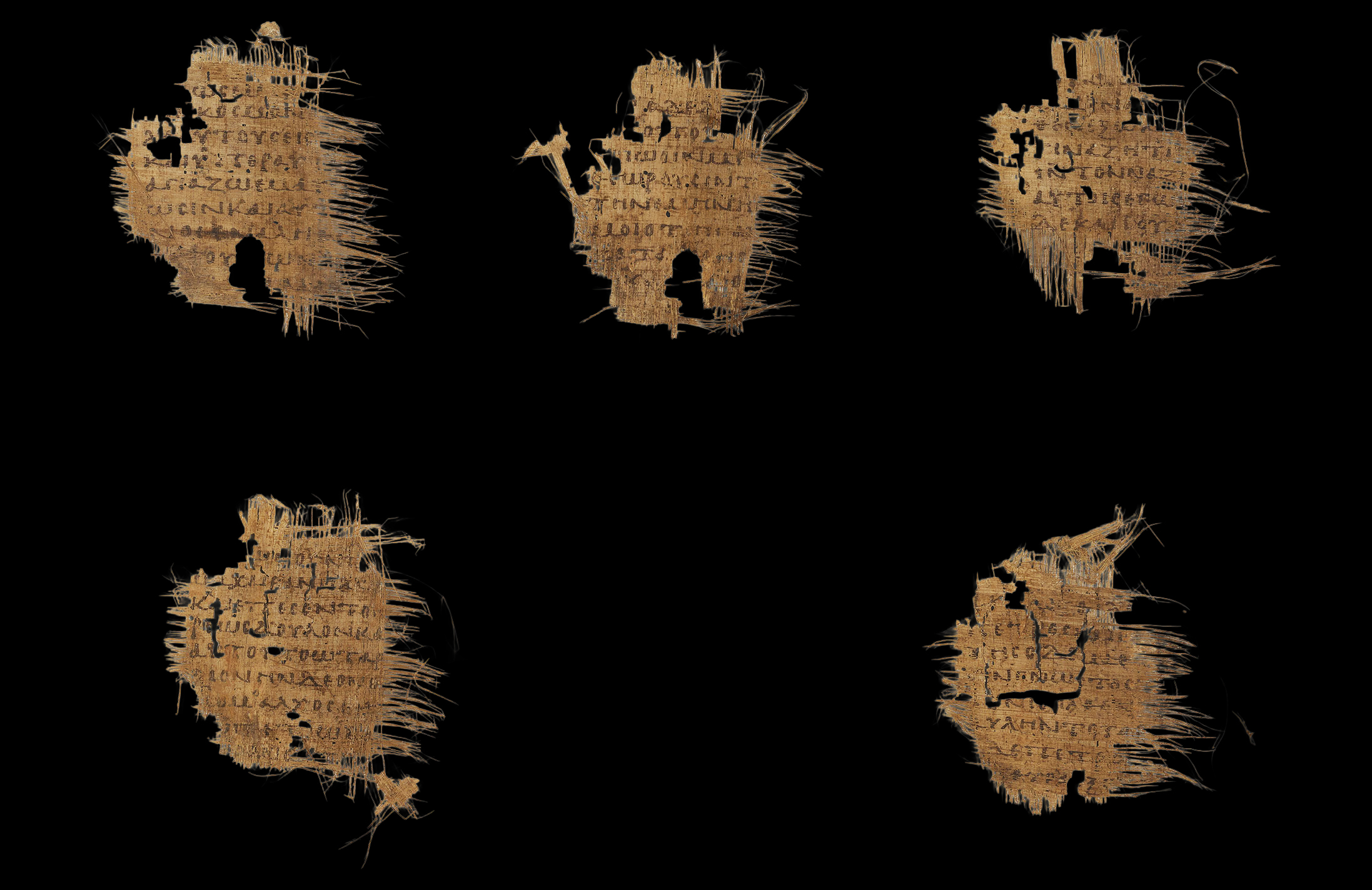
Fragments 6-10 recto, John 17:18-20; 17:24-25; 18:4-5; 18:10-11; 18:15-16

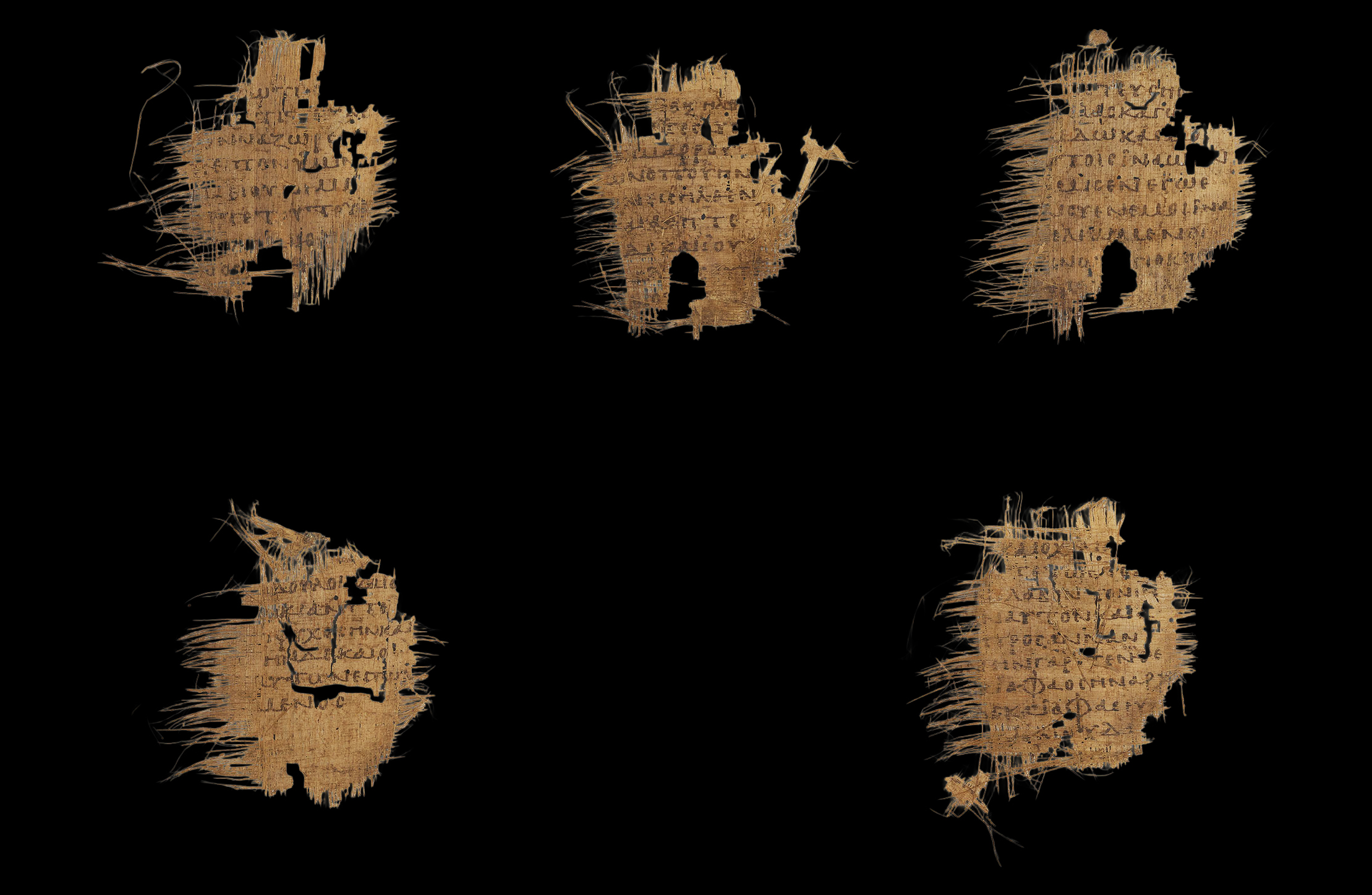
Fragments 6-10 verso, John 17:21-23; 18:1-2; 18:7-9; 18:12-14; 18:18

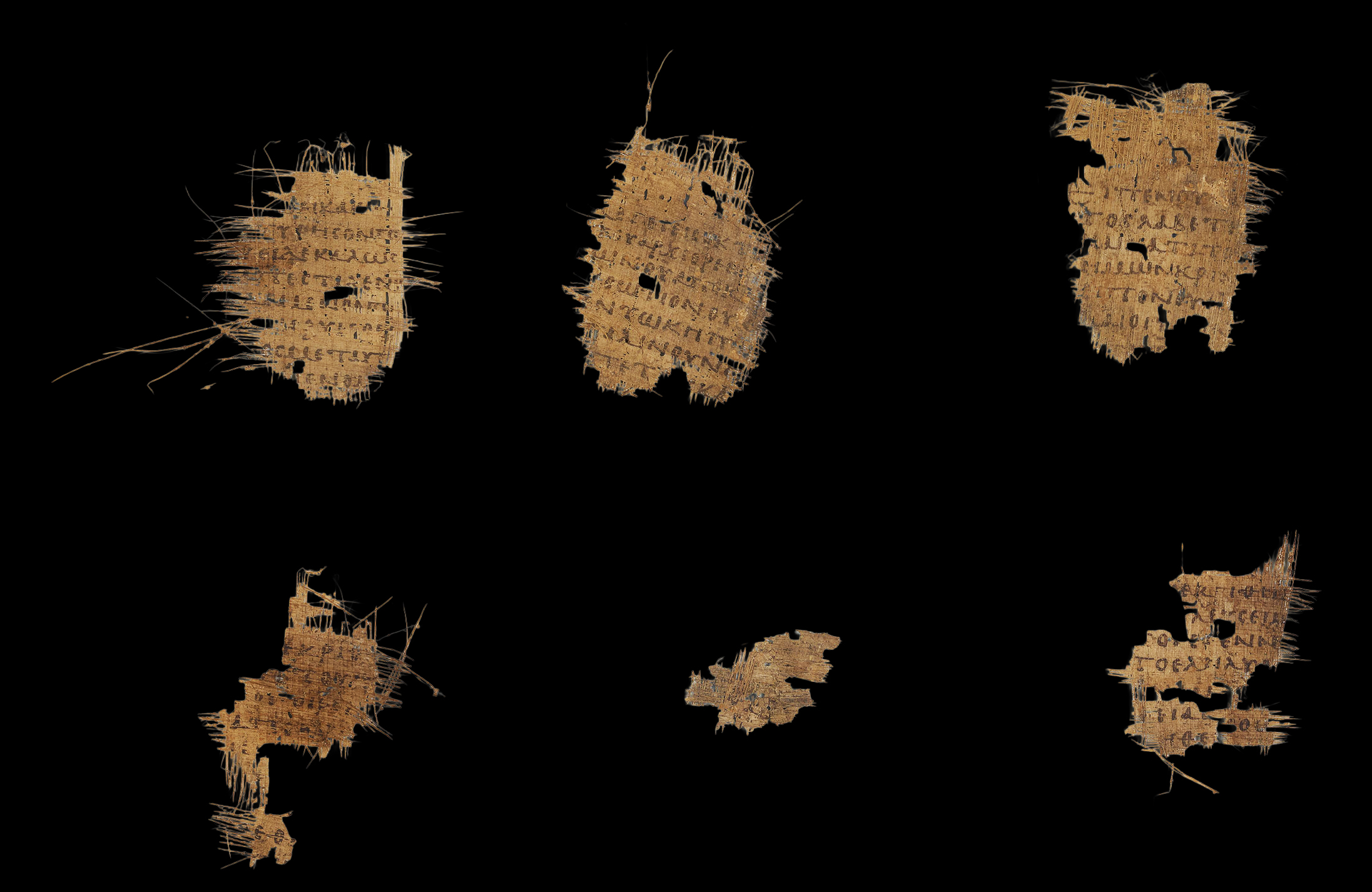
Fragments 11-15 recto, John 18:23-27; 18:31; 18:34-35; 18:37

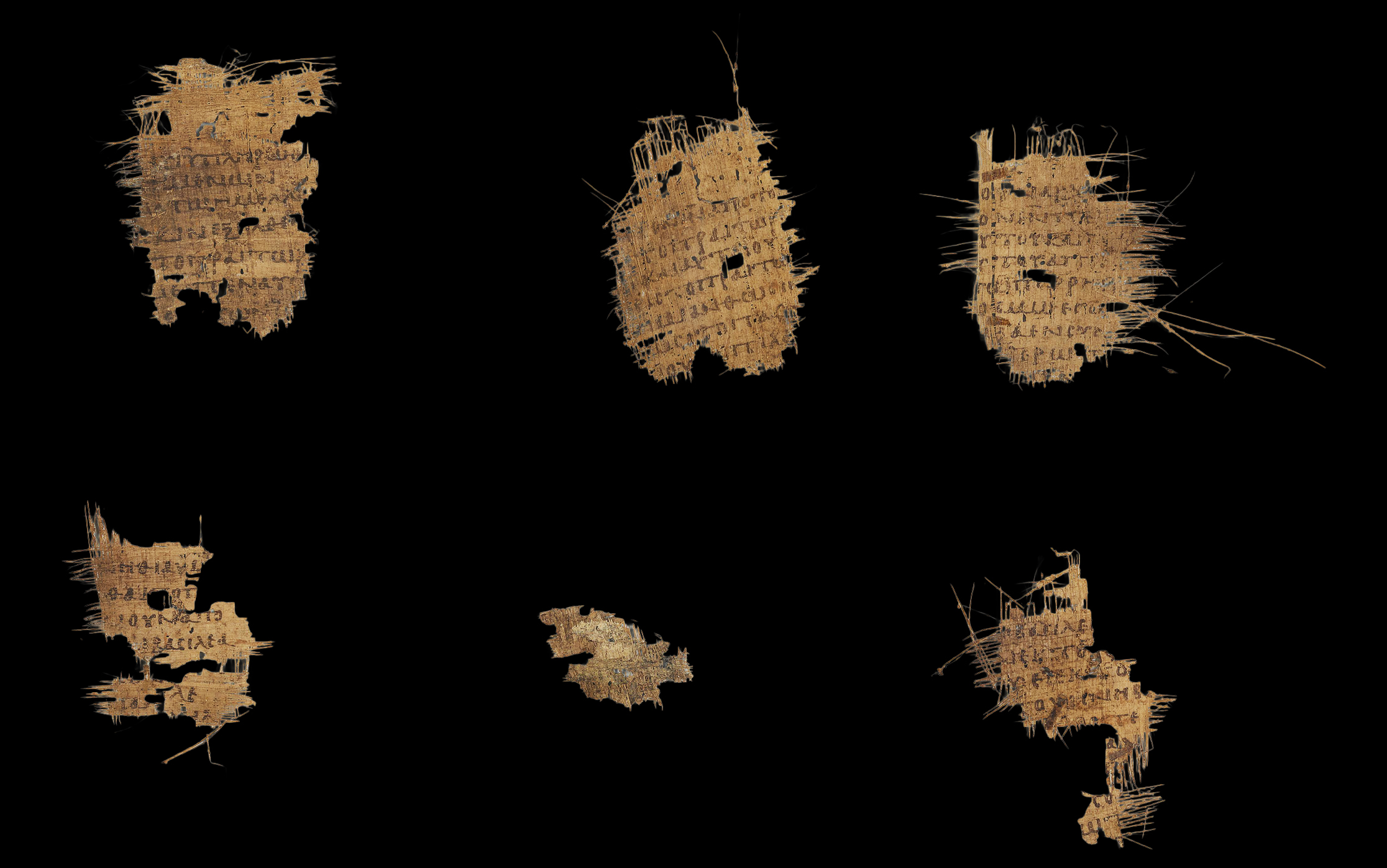
Fragments 11-15 verso, John 18:19-20; 18:28-29; 18:32-33; 18:36; 18:39-40

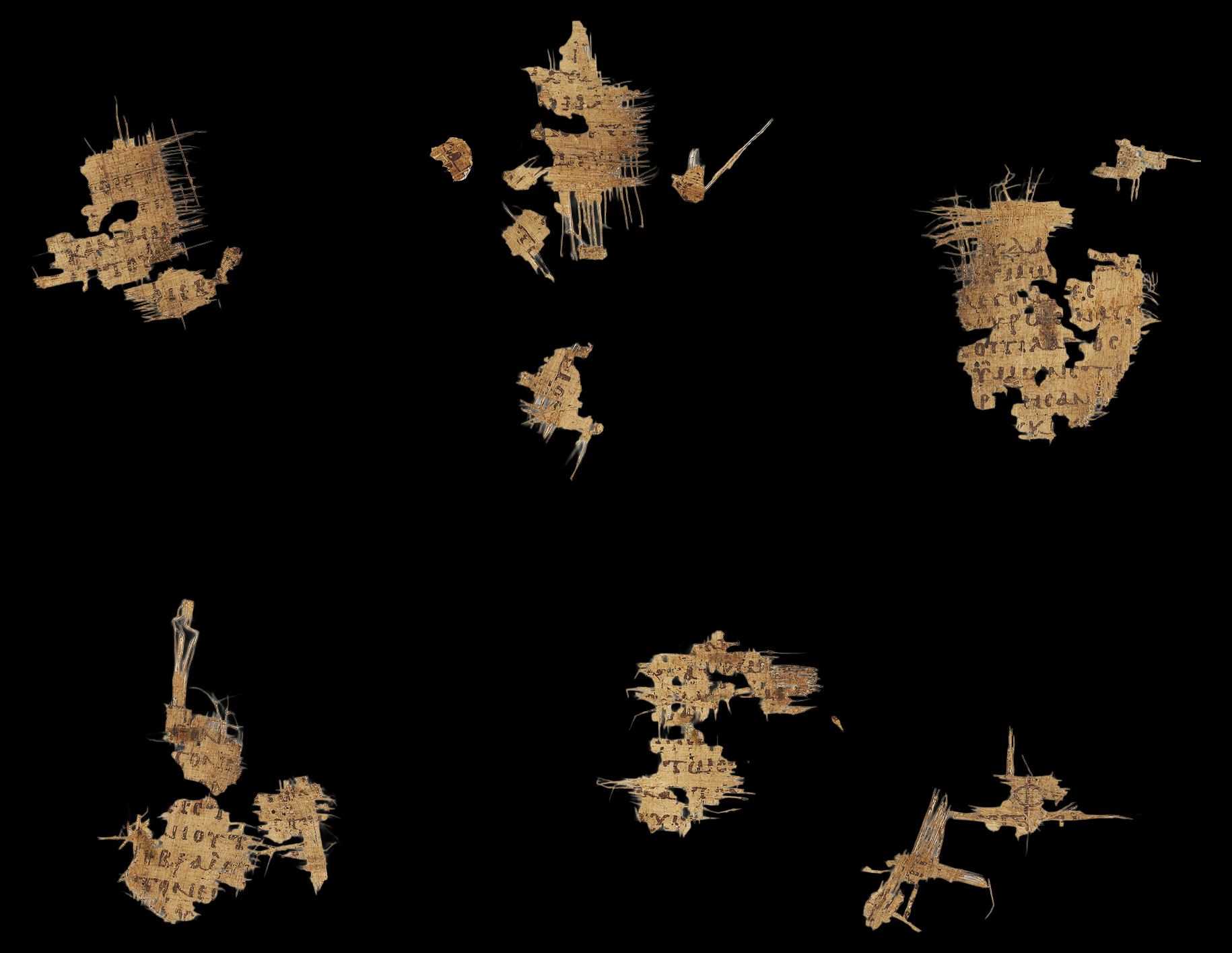
Fragments 16-20 recto, John 19:2-3; 19:10-11; 19:14-18; 19:23

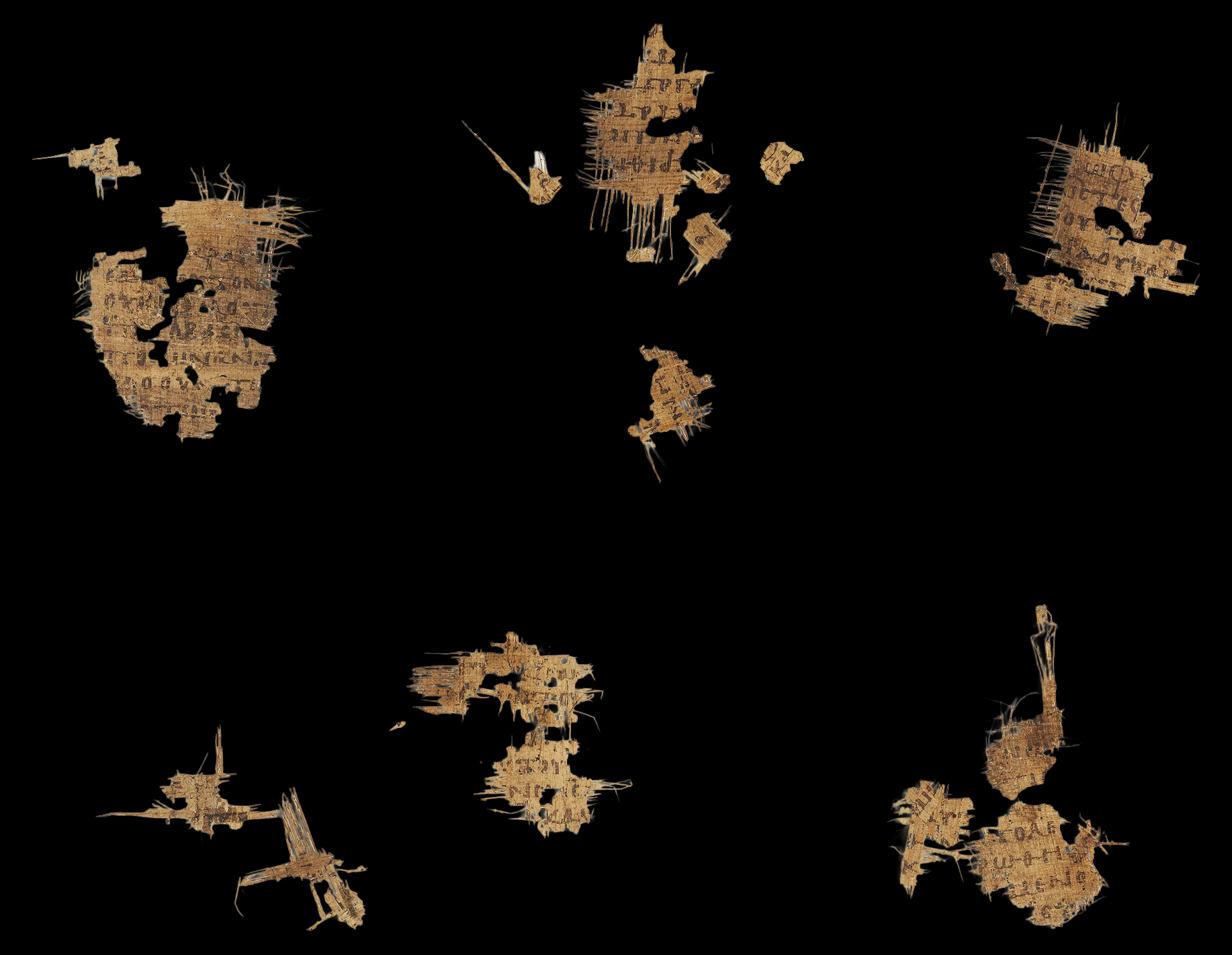
Fragments 16-20 recto, John 19:5-8; 19:12-13; 19:20; 19:24-26

== See also ==
- List of New Testament papyri
