= Heinrich August Wilhelm Meyer =

German protestant clergyman

Heinrich August Wilhelm Meyer (10 January 1800 – 21 June 1873) was a German Lutheran theologian. He wrote commentaries on the New Testament and published an edition of that book.

== Biography ==
Meyer was born in Gotha. He studied theology at Jena, was pastor at Harste, Hoya, also serving as superintendent there, and at Neustadt am Rübenberge, and eventually became a member of the Consistory of the Church of Hanover and superintendent at Hanover in 1841.

He is chiefly noted for his valuable Kritischexegetischer Kommentar zum Neuen Testament (16 vols.), which began to appear in 1832, was completed in 1859 with the assistance of Johann Eduard Huther, Friedrich Düsterdieck and Gottlieb Lünemann, and has been translated into English. New editions have been undertaken by such scholars as A. B. Ritschl, Bernhard Weiss, Hans Hinrich Wendt, Carl Friedrich Georg Heinrici, Willibald Beyschlag and Friedrich A. E. Sieffert. The English translation in Clark's series is in 20 volumes (1873–82), and there is an American edition in 11 volumes (1884–88). An 1880 edition translated by Peter Christie and revised and edited by Frederick Crombie is available online.

Meyer also published an edition of the New Testament, with a translation (1829) and a Latin version of the symbolical books of the Lutheran Church (1830).

He died in Hanover.
