= John 12 =

- ← chapter 11 chapter 13 →
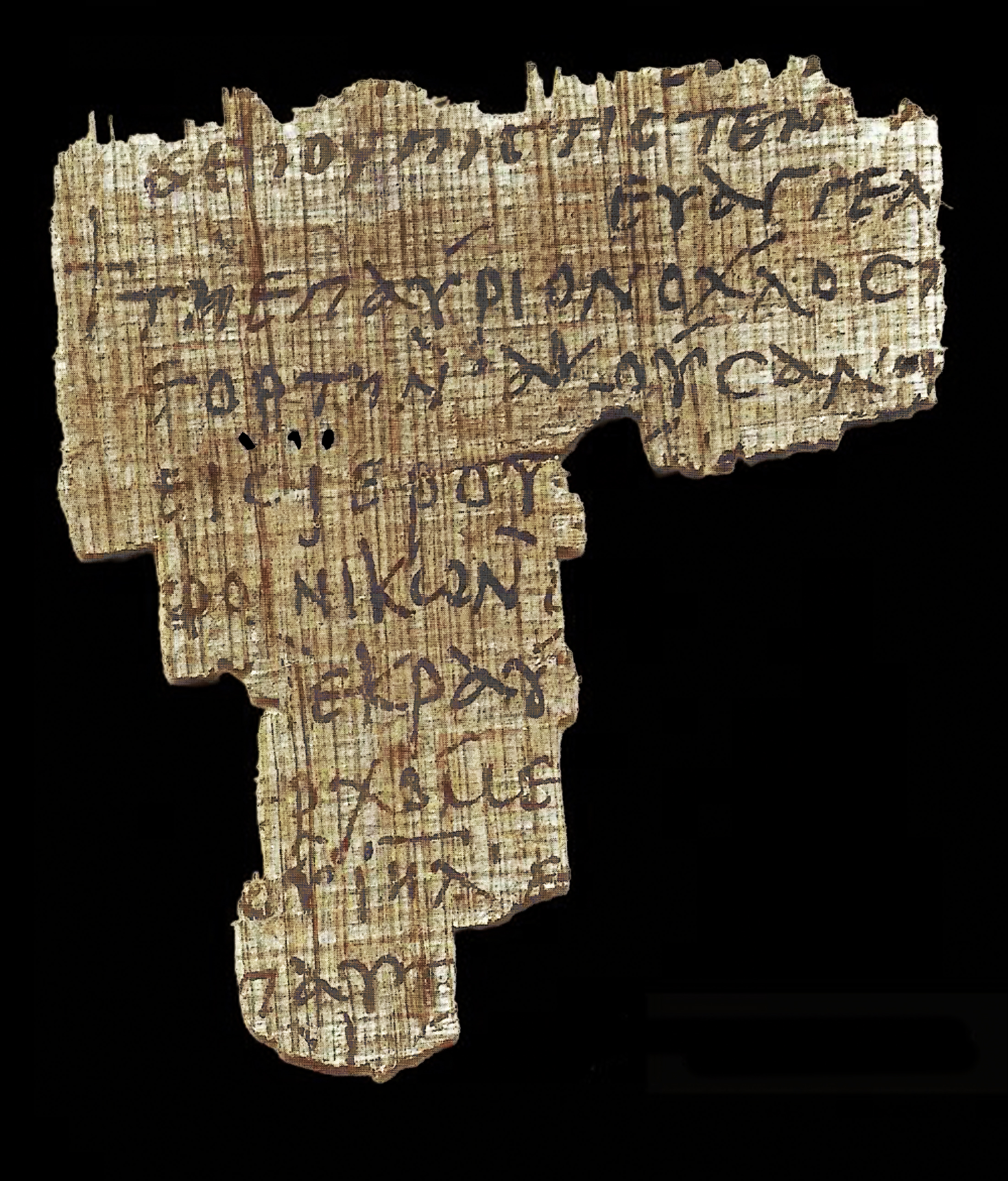
- John 12:12–15 in Greek in Papyrus 2 (Egyptian Museum, Florence, inv. nr. 7134). Luke 7:22-26.50 in Coptic on reverse. 6th century.
- Book: Gospel of John
- Category: Gospel
- Christian Bible part: New Testament
- Order in the Christian part: 4

John 12 is the twelfth chapter of the Gospel of John in the New Testament of the Christian Bible. It narrates an anointing of Jesus' feet, attributed to Mary of Bethany, as well as an account of the triumphal entry of Jesus Christ into Jerusalem. The gospel identifies an unnamed "disciple whom Jesus loved" as its source and possible author. Early Christian tradition unanimously affirmed that John composed this Gospel.

== Text ==
The original text was written in Koine Greek. This chapter is divided into 50 verses.

=== Textual witnesses ===
Some early manuscripts containing the text of this chapter in Koine Greek are:

- Papyrus 75 (AD 175–225)
- Papyrus 66 (c. 200)
- Codex Vaticanus (325–350)
- Codex Sinaiticus (330–360)
- Codex Bezae (c. 400)
- Codex Alexandrinus (400–440)
- Papyrus 2 (c. 550; extant verses 12–15)
- Papyrus 128 (6th/7th century; extant verses 16–18)
- Papyrus 59 (7th century; extant verses 25, 29, 31, 35)

== Places ==
Events recorded in this chapter refer to the following locations:

- Bethany (John 11:1), about 15 stadia (15 furlongs or 2 miles) away from Jerusalem (John 11:18)
- Jerusalem

== Old Testament references ==
- John 12:13: Psalm 118:26
- John 12:15: Zechariah 9:9
- John 12:27: Psalm 6:3a; Psalm 42:6
- John 12:34: Psalm 110:4
- John 12:38: Isaiah 53:1
- John 12:40: Isaiah 6:10

== New Testament references ==
- John 12:21 reflects John 1:44.

== The anointing at Bethany (verses 1–8) ==
=== Verses 1–3 ===
Then, six days before the Passover, Jesus came to Bethany, where Lazarus was who had been dead, whom He had raised from the dead.

The narrative suggests that Jesus and His disciples travelled to Bethany from Ephraim, where Jesus had been staying to avoid the Jewish leaders who were plotting to kill him (John 11:53–54). He dined with Lazarus, Martha and Mary, a family well known to Jesus (John 11:1–3). This family group had been introduced to the readers of John's Gospel in chapter 11, where Mary is described as "that Mary who anointed the Lord with fragrant oil and wiped His feet with her hair".

Verse 2 notes that "Martha [alone] served", while Lazarus was "one of those reclining with [Jesus] at table". John Chrysostom notes that Mary did not "serve" because she had a different role in this narrative: she was a disciple rather than a server".

Then Mary took about a pint of pure nard, an expensive perfume; she poured it on Jesus' feet and wiped his feet with her hair. And the house was filled with the fragrance of the perfume.

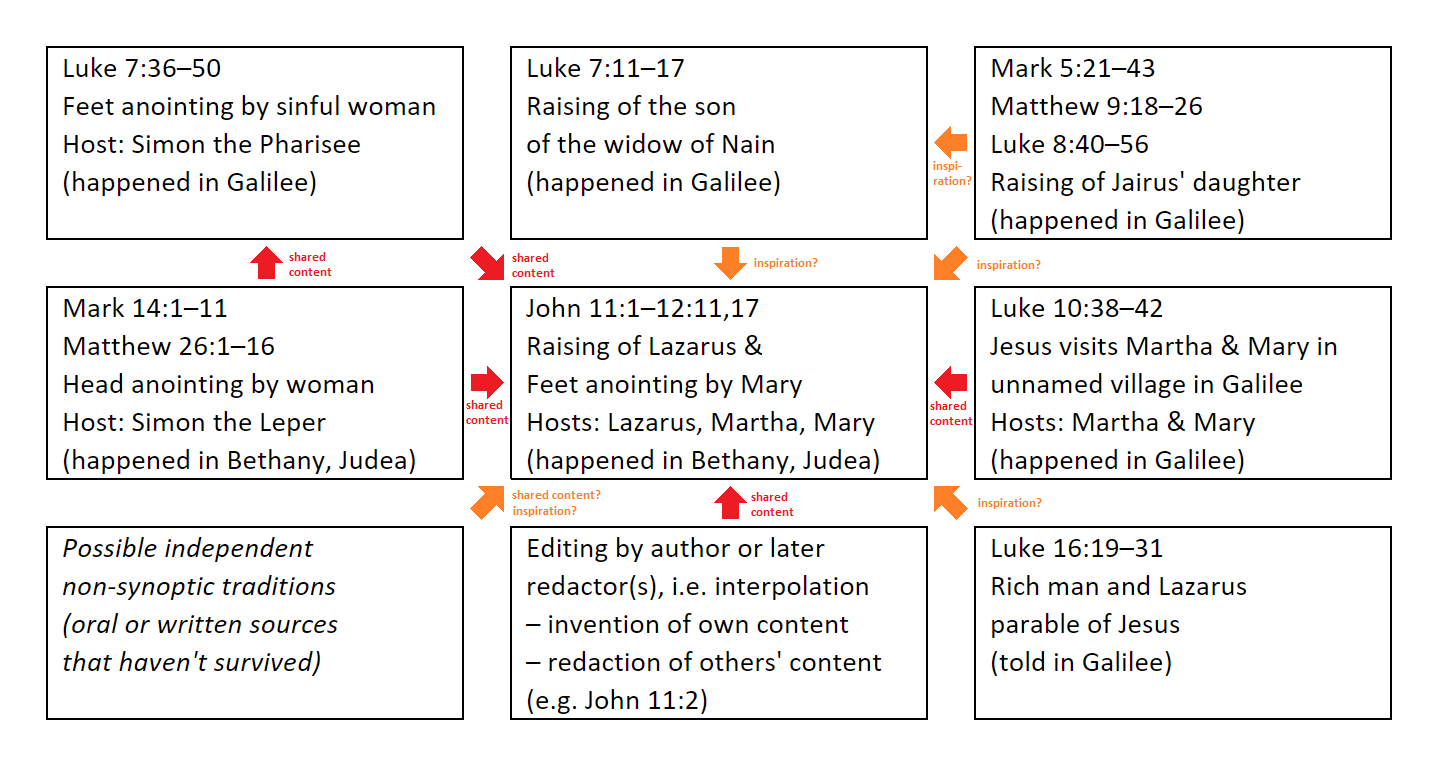
New Testament scholars have sought to explain how the story of Mary of Bethany was probably composed.

Verse 12:3 is curiously foretold in verse 11:2, and shows many striking similarities with, but also differences from, various traditions narrated in the other canonical gospels, which has created much scholarly controversy. New Testament scholars try to establish how John's narrative of the raising of Lazarus and the subsequent feet-anointing of Jesus by Mary of Bethany (John 11:1–12:11,17) was composed by seeking to explain its apparent relationships with the older textual traditions of the Synoptic Gospels (Mark, Matthew, and Luke). The author of John seems to have combined elements from several – apparently originally unrelated – stories into a single narrative. These include the unnamed woman's head-anointing of Jesus in Bethany (Mark 14, Matthew 26), the sinful woman's feet-anointing (and hair-wiping) of Jesus in Galilee (Luke 7; these first two may have a common origin, the Lukan account likely being derived from Mark), Jesus' visit to Martha and Mary in the unnamed Galilean village (Luke 10), Jesus' parable of the rich man and Lazarus (Luke 16), and possibly others involving Jesus' miraculous raising of the dead (the raising of Jairus' daughter and the raising of the son of the widow of Nain). Meanwhile, other elements were removed or replaced; for example, Simon the Leper/Simon the Pharisee was replaced by Lazarus as the host of the feast in Jesus' honour, and Bethany in Judea was chosen as the setting, while most elements of John's narrative correspond to traditions that the Synoptics set in Galilee. Scholars pay particular attention to verse John 11:2 (and John 11:1), which may represent an effort by the author or a later redactor to stress a connection between these stories that is, however, not found in the older canonical gospels. They further argue that the actual anointing will not be narrated until verse 12:3, and that neither Mary, nor Martha, nor the village of these sisters, nor any anointing is mentioned in the Gospel of John before this point, suggesting that the author (or redactor) assumes the readers already have knowledge of these characters, this location and this event, and wants to tell them that these were connected (which he apparently knew the readers did not commonly know/believe yet) long before giving the readers more details. Esler and Piper (2006) posited that verse 11:2 is evidence that the author of the Gospel of John deliberately mixed up several traditions in an 'audacious attempt (...) to rework the collective memory of the Christ-movement'. According to Esler, the author did not strive to give a historically accurate account of what had happened, but instead, for theological purposes, combined various existing narratives in order to construct Lazarus, Mary and Martha of Bethany as a prototypical Christian family, whose example is to be followed by Christians.

=== Verses 4–6 ===
Judas Iscariot, described as "one of [Jesus'] disciples" and "Simon’s son, who would betray Him", asks “Why was this fragrant oil not sold for three hundred denarii (Greek: δηναρίων τριακοσίων) and the money given to poor people (or the poor)?” The New International Version, New King James Version and New Living Translation all equate this amount to a year's wages. In Mark 14:5 the oil is also valued at three hundred denarii; in Matthew 26:9 it could have been sold for "a high (but unspecified) price". H W Watkins computes that, since in John 6:7, two hundred denarii would purchase food for 5,000, three hundred denarii would have fed 7,500 people.

John's Gospel is the only one which observes that Judas was responsible for the disciples' "common fund" or "money box", both here in verse 6 and again in John 13:29. The term το γλωσσοκομον (glōssokomon) "means literally "a case for mouthpieces" of musical instruments, and hence any portable chest. It occurs in the Septuagint texts of 2 Chronicles 24:8,11.

=== Verse 7 ===
But Jesus said, “Let her alone; she has kept this for the day of My burial.

The New Revised Standard Version, differing from other translations, reads "She bought it so that she might keep it for the day of my burial".

== The plot to kill Lazarus (verses 9–11) ==
A great many of the Jews came to Bethany, "not for Jesus’ sake only, but that they might also see Lazarus, whom He had raised from the dead. The wording of verse 9 suggests that Jesus remains a while in the town. But the chief priests plotted to put Lazarus to death also, because on account of him many of the Jews went away and believed in Jesus" (John 12:9–11). Augustine comments on "the folly of the priests — as if Christ could not raise Lazarus a second time!" Matthew Poole asks, "What had Lazarus done?" The plot to put Lazarus to death may be read alongside the developing plot to kill Jesus (John 10:31, 39; John 11:53) as if there were parallel plots "to kill Lazarus as well as Jesus", or even to kill Lazarus first - as Albert Barnes suggests: "as it was determined to kill Jesus, so they consulted about the propriety of removing Lazarus first, that the number of his followers might be lessened, and that the death of Jesus might make less commotion". But the observation that "on account of [Lazarus] many of the Jews went away (from the Pharisees) and believed in Jesus (John 12:10) could indicate that in the early church Lazarus was influential in converting many Jews to the belief that Jesus was the Messiah.

== Jesus' triumphal entry into Jerusalem (verses 12–19) ==
John 12:12 states that on "the next day", a great multitude who had come to Jerusalem for the feast of Passover, "heard that Jesus was coming to Jerusalem", and so they took branches of palm trees and went out to meet Him. John 12:1 presents Jesus in Bethany "six days before the Passover", so His entry into Jerusalem can be understood as taking place five days before the Passover, on "the tenth day of the Jewish month Nisan, on which the paschal lamb was set apart to be 'kept up until the fourteenth day of the same month, when the whole assembly of the congregation of Israel were to kill it in the evening'.

"‘On the tenth of this month every man shall take for himself a lamb, according to the house of his father, a lamb for a household. And if the household is too small for the lamb, let him and his neighbor next to his house take it according to the number of the persons; according to each man’s need you shall make your count for the lamb. Your lamb shall be without blemish, a male of the first year. You may take it from the sheep or from the goats. Now you shall keep it until the fourteenth day of the same month" (Exodus 12:3–6).

== Greek pilgrims in Jerusalem (verses 20–36) ==
Some ethnic Greeks (Greek: Ἕλληνές) had also made the pilgrimage to Jerusalem for the feast (John 12:20). Jesus' interest in teaching the Greeks of the diaspora has already proved a matter of some intrigue in chapter 7 (John 7:35). Bengel's Gnomen notes that "it is not clear that they were circumcised: certainly, at least, they were worshippers of the One God of Israel" – they were present in Jerusalem "that they might worship at the feast (Greek: ἵνα προσκυνήσωσιν ἐν τῇ ἑορτῇ). John uses the same word, προσκυνειν, proskunein, literally to kneel and kiss the ground, in John 4:20–24 in relation to the Jewish-Samaritan debate over the sacred place "where one ought to worship" (John 4:20; NKJV translation), where He announces that "the hour is coming when you will [worship] neither on this mountain (Mount Gerizim), nor in Jerusalem".

Meyer's New Testament Commentary and the Expanded Bible (2011) both state that these pilgrims were "gentiles". They had presumably "heard that Jesus was coming to Jerusalem" on the same basis as the Jewish multitude mentioned in John 12:12, although Meyer raises the possibility that "they came to Philip accidentally". The evangelist raises the question of whether they can see (meet) (or believe in) Jesus (John 12:21). "They came to Philip, who was from Bethsaida of Galilee, and asked him, saying, 'Sir, we wish to see Jesus'. Philip came and told Andrew, and in turn Andrew and Philip told Jesus. The evangelist repeats the information already provided at John 1:44, that Philip came from Bethsaida in Galilee, which was "also the city of Andrew and Peter". Both Philip and Andrew have Greek names. Watkins considers it "a striking coincidence, and perhaps more than this, that the Greeks thus came into connection with the only Apostles who bear Greek names".

=== Verse 23 ===
Watkins observes that the coming of the Greeks is mentioned "not for the sake of the fact itself, but for that of the discourse which followed upon it", while Swedish-based commentator René Kieffer notes that it is to them, along with the rest of his audience, that Jesus reveals the mystery of his imminent death:

The hour has come that the Son of Man should be glorified.

=== Verses 24–27 ===
Jesus' discourse, set out in John 12:24–27, leaves readers "in doubt as to the result of the Greeks’ request":

"Most assuredly, I say to you, unless a grain (or kernel) of wheat falls into the ground and dies, it remains alone; but if it dies, it produces much grain. He who loves his life will lose it, and he who hates his life in this world will keep it for eternal life. If anyone serves Me, let him follow Me; and where I am, there My servant will be also. If anyone serves Me, him My Father will honour. Now My soul is troubled, and what shall I say? ‘Father, save Me from this hour’? But for this purpose I came to this hour. 'Father, glorify Your name'.”

The evangelist addresses directly the issue that the Messiah had died: "Strange as it may seem to you that the Messiah should die, yet this is but the course of nature: a seed cannot be glorified unless it dies". Paul refers to the same idea in 1 Corinthians 15:36: "What you sow does not come to life unless it dies".

Theologian Harold Buls suggests that the grain of wheat which "falls into the ground and dies" (John 12:24) refers to Jesus alone, whereas the teaching that "he who loves his life will lose it, and he who hates his life in this world will keep it for eternal life" (John 12:25) applies "to all people, Jews and Gentiles". The Greek: ἀπολλύει, apollyei (loses) is written as ἀπολέσει, apolesei (will lose) in the Byzantine Majority Text, but Watkins argues that the present text has "slightly more probability":

"the loss of life is not in the future only, but that in the present, in every moment when a man loves and seeks to save his own life, he is then, and by that very seeking, actually losing it".

The Cambridge Bible for Schools and Colleges notes that in verse 25, two Greek words, ψυχὴν, psychēn and ζωὴν, zōēn, are both translated into English as "life": "in the first two cases (ψυχὴν), 'life' means the life of the individual, in the last (ζωὴν), life in the abstract. By sacrificing life in the one sense, we may win life in the other". This work also comments that Matthew 10:39, Matthew 16:25, Mark 8:35, Luke 9:24 and Luke 17:33 all express the same idea, and that a "comparison of the texts will show that most of them refer to different occasions, so that this solemn warning must have been often on [Jesus'] lips". The Living Bible makes the distinction clearer by paraphrasing ζωὴν as "eternal glory".

=== Verse 28 ===
"Father, glorify your name." Then a voice came from heaven: "I have glorified it, and I will glorify it again."

The Jerusalem Bible refers to a variant reading, "Father, glorify your Son".

=== Verses 31–33 ===
Jesus goes on to make the following statement:

"Now is the judgment of this world; now will the ruler of this world be cast out. And I, when I am lifted up from the earth, will draw all people to myself." He said this to show by what kind of death he was going to die.

The meaning of this teaching (especially verse 32) has been the subject of much exegetical and theological dispute. Some have interpreted Christ's promise here (that "all" will be drawn to him) in light of his teaching in John 6:44 that those drawn to him will be "raised up on the last day," so as to imply eventual universal salvation. Others have appealed to the contextual detail in verse 20 ("some Greeks" sought Jesus), so as to infer that Christ only means that people of all kinds (Gentiles as well as Jews) will be drawn to him, rather than every individual without exception. Still others have suggested that he means only that all will be 'invited' or 'summoned' to Christ, not that all will necessarily be effectually regenerated and saved. Much of this depends upon how one understands the meaning of the Greek words πᾶς ("all") and ἕλκω ("to draw"), as they are used in this context.

== Fulfilment of the prophecies of Isaiah (verses 37–43) ==
The evangelist relates Jesus' teaching and its reception to two passages taken from the prophet Isaiah, whose words Jesus had also used in the synoptic gospels at the commencement of Jesus' public ministry (Luke 4:18). The two passages quoted are Isaiah 6:10 and 53:1, both relating to belief and resistance:

He has blinded their eyes and hardened their hearts, lest they should see with their eyes, lest they should understand with their hearts and turn, so that I should heal them
Lord, who has believed our report (or message)? And to whom has the arm of the Lord been revealed?

Meyer identifies these words with "the close of the public ministry of Jesus", a point at which there is an assessment of the results of His teaching "in respect to faith in Him".

== Closing observations (verses 44–50) ==
Verses 44–50 represent the close of Jesus' public ministry. He "cries out" (verse 44), a phrase which the Cambridge Bible for Schools and Colleges says "implies public teaching". Verse 36 ("These things Jesus spoke, and departed, and was hidden from them") indicate that the final verses of the chapter act as an "epilogue and recapitulation", "a sort of summary and winding up of His whole testimony", or "the thoughts of St. John as he looked back on the unbelief of Judaism".

The evangelist summarises Jesus' mission: he was sent by God the Father to offer eternal life (John 12:50). "With this the first main division of the Gospel ends. Christ’s revelation of Himself to the world in His ministry is concluded. The Evangelist has set before us the Testimony to the Christ, the Work of the Christ, and the Judgment respecting the work, which has ended in a conflict, and the conflict has reached a climax".

== See also ==
- Bethany
- Lazarus
- Jerusalem
- Jesus Christ
- Judas Iscariot
- Mary
- Martha
- Simon the Leper
- Triumphal entry into Jerusalem
- Related Bible parts: Psalm 118, Isaiah 6, Isaiah 53, Zechariah 9, Matthew 21, Matthew 26, Mark 11, Mark 14, Luke 19

== Bibliography ==
- Kirkpatrick, A. F. (1901). The Book of Psalms: with Introduction and Notes. The Cambridge Bible for Schools and Colleges. Vol. Book IV and V: Psalms XC-CL. Cambridge: At the University Press.

Preceded by John 11	Chapters of the Bible; Gospel of John	Succeeded by John 13
