= Matthew 26 =

- ← chapter 25 chapter 27 →
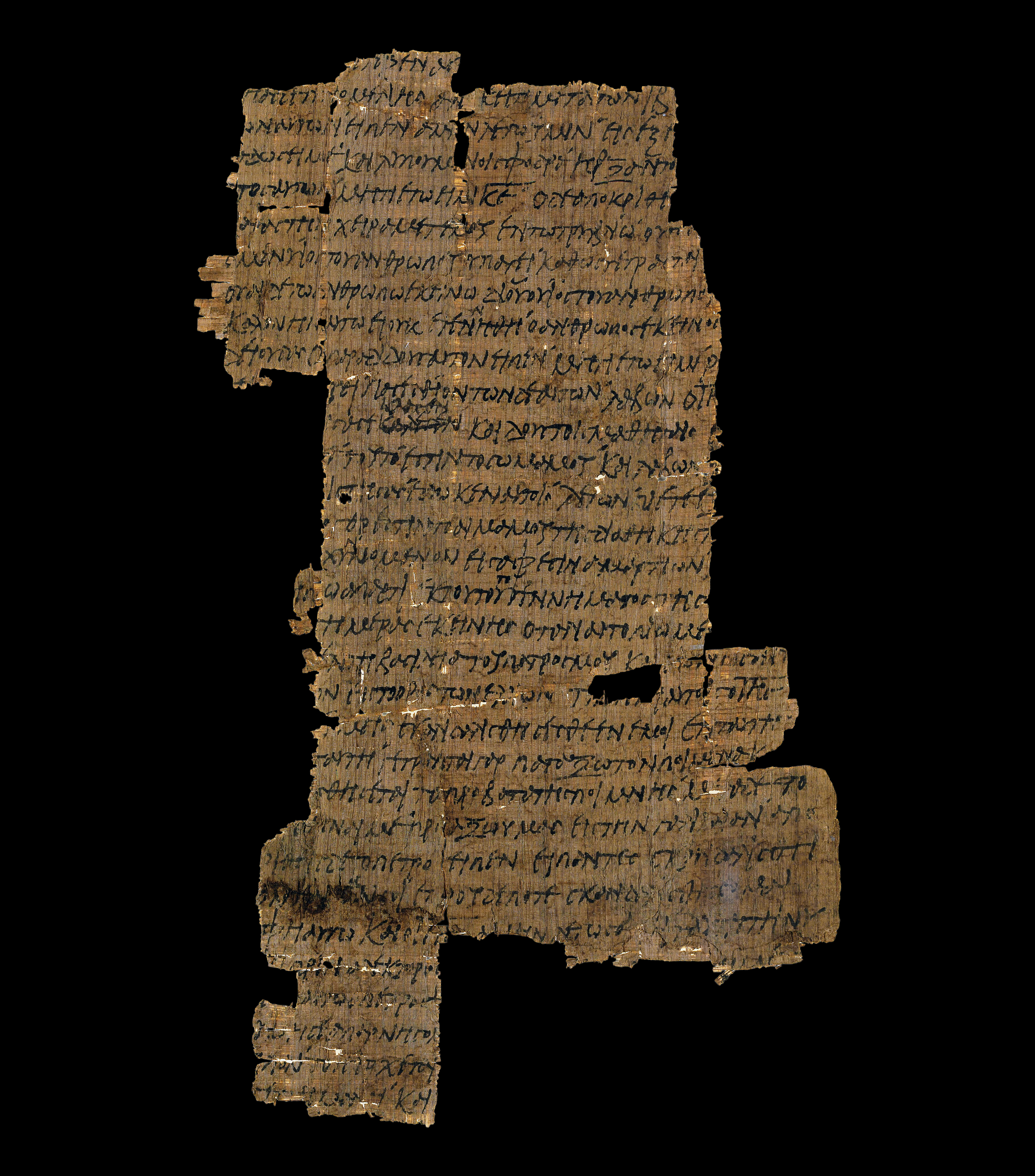
- Gospel of Matthew 26:19–37 on the recto side of Papyrus 37, from c. AD 260
- Book: Gospel of Matthew
- Category: Gospel
- Christian Bible part: New Testament
- Order in the Christian part: 1

Matthew 26 is the 26th chapter of the Gospel of Matthew, part of the New Testament of the Christian Bible. This chapter covers the beginning of the Passion of Jesus narrative, which continues to Matthew 28; it contains the narratives of the Jewish leaders' plot to kill Jesus, Judas Iscariot's agreement to betray Jesus to Caiphas, the Last Supper with the Twelve Apostles and institution of the Eucharist, the Agony in the Garden of Gethsemane and the subsequent vindication of Jesus' predictions, of betrayal by one of the twelve Apostles, and that he will, in the Denial of Peter, be disowned by his closest follower, Saint Peter.

== Text ==
The original text was written in Koine Greek. This chapter is divided into 75 verses, more than any other chapter in this gospel. Protestant theologian Heinrich Meyer identifies 32 verses in which there are critical variations between different early manuscripts and critical editions.

=== Textual witnesses ===
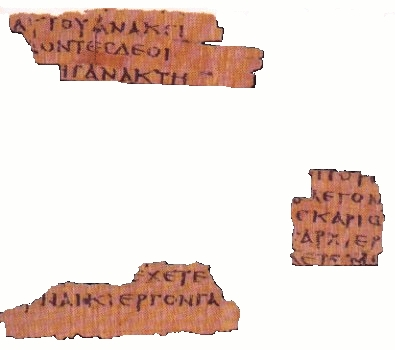
Matthew 26:7–8, 10, 14–15 on Papyrus 64, also known as Magdalen papyrus, from late 2nd/3rd century

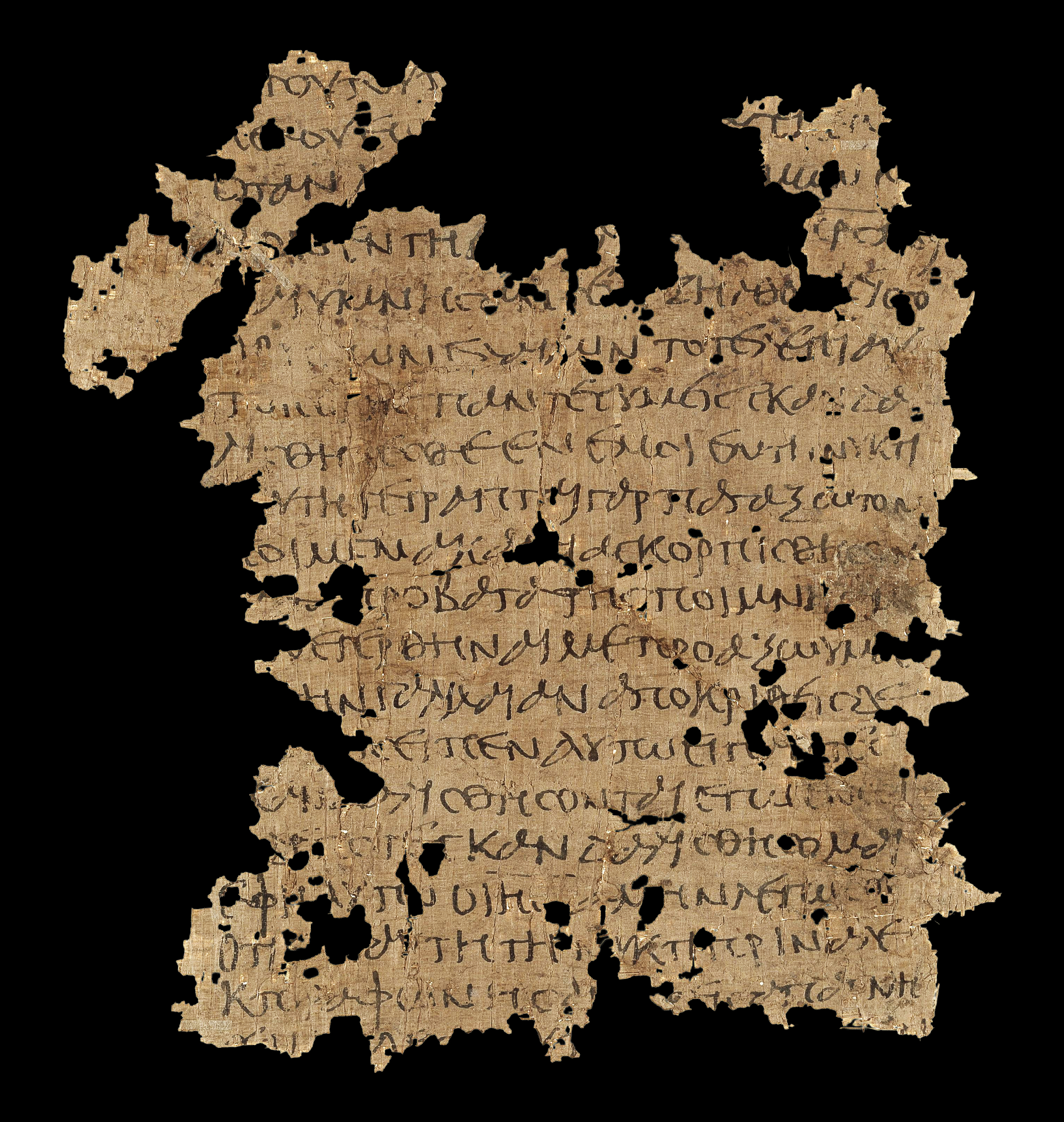
Matthew 26:29–35 on Papyrus 53, from 3rd century

Some early manuscripts containing the text of this chapter are:

- Papyrus 64 (Magdalen Papyrus) (late 2nd/3rd century; extant: verses 7–8, 10, 14–15)
- Papyrus 37 (~260; extant verses 19–37)
- Papyrus 53 (3rd century; extant verses 29–35)
- Codex Vaticanus (325–50)
- Codex Sinaiticus (330–60)
- Codex Bezae (c. 400)
- Codex Washingtonianus (c. 400)
- Codex Ephraemi Rescriptus (c. 450)
- Codex Purpureus Rossanensis (6th century)
- Codex Petropolitanus Purpureus (6th century; extant verses 58–64).

=== Old Testament references ===
- Matthew 26:38: Psalm 42:5.

== Structure ==
The New King James Version (NKJV) organises the material in this chapter as follows:

- The Plot to Kill Jesus (Matthew 26:1–5)
- The Anointing at Bethany (Matthew 26:6–13)
- Judas Agrees to Betray Jesus (Matthew 26:14–16)
- Jesus Celebrates Passover with His Disciples (Matthew 26:17–25)
- Jesus Institutes the Lord’s Supper (Matthew 26:26–30)
- Jesus Predicts Peter’s Denial (Matthew 26:31–35)
- The Prayer in the Garden (Matthew 26:36–46)
- Betrayal and Arrest in Gethsemane (Matthew 26:47–56)
- Jesus Faces the Sanhedrin (Matthew 26:57–68)
- Peter Denies Jesus, and Weeps Bitterly (Matthew 26:69–75)

== Prologue to the passion narrative (verses 1–5) ==
Verses 1–5 recount the conspiracy against Jesus.

=== Verse 1 ===
Now it came to pass, when Jesus had finished all these sayings, that He said to His disciples,

William Robertson Nicoll states that this verse links with the previous chapters at the same time as serving as an introduction to the passion history commencing here. It may form part of the tradition of Jesus' passion which developed as a recollection of Jesus' life before other parts of the gospel tradition: "Of the three strata of evangelic tradition relating respectively to what Jesus taught, what He did, and what He suffered, the last-named probably came first in origin." Meyer, reflecting the opinion of another German theologian, Johannes Wichelhaus, notes "the fact that our Lord’s functions as a teacher were now ended".

The words πάντας τοὺς λόγους τούτους, all these sayings, would most naturally be taken as referring to the contents of chapters 24 and 25, although "a backward glance at the whole of Christ’s teaching is conceivable. Yet in case of such a comprehensive retrospect why refer only to words? Why not to both dicta et facta (words and deeds)?"

=== Verse 2 ===
You know that the Passover takes place after two days, and the Son of Man will be handed over to be crucified.

"After two days": the Jewish feast of the Passover began on the 15th of the month of Nisan. Matthew begins his narrative of the betrayal and death of Jesus two days before the Passover, i.e. on the 13th of Nisan. This may allude to the traditions related to the binding of Isaac that Genesis 22:4 places the sacrifice of Isaac on the third day, and during Passover (in Jubilees 17:15; 18:3). A further parallel between Jesus and Isaac is indicated in Romans 8:32, whereas Matthew 26:36 could allude to Genesis 22:2–5.

Johann Bengel argues for translating the Greek: παραδιδοται, paradidotai, in the present tense, "is delivered": at this time, while Jesus "was preparing Himself entirely for suffering... [his] enemies were labouring to effect the same object".

=== Verse 3 ===
Then the chief priests and the elders of the people assembled in the palace of the high priest, whose name was Caiaphas.

== The anointing at Bethany (verses 6–13) ==
In the home of Simon the Leper, "another befriended outcast", a woman performed an 'extravagant act' which clearly points to Jesus' messianic status as 'the anointed one', a "small gesture" which must nevertheless have brought him some comfort. In verse 8, the disciples, collectively, raise concerns about the extravagance shown, whereas in John 12:4 this concern is only expressed by Judas Iscariot. Meyer argues that Matthew's account is "certainly not contradictory [to] that of John, but only less precise". This pericope closes with Jesus' pronouncement that "what she has done" will be recalled "wherever [the] gospel is proclaimed in the whole world".

== Judas agrees to betray Jesus (verses 14–16) ==
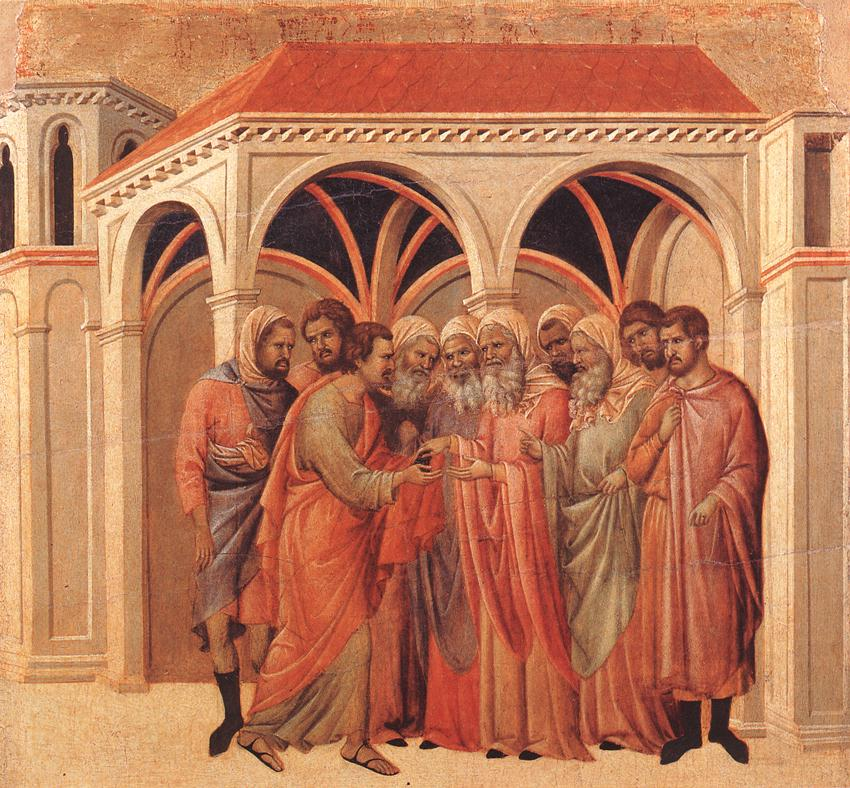
Judas making a bargain with the priests, depicted by Duccio, early 14th century

In contrast to the extravagant act of the woman who anoints Jesus, Judas Iscariot (cf. Matthew 10:4) plans a treacherous act. Theologian Dale Allison observes a clear distinction between the selfless costly gift given by the woman and the selfish thought of Judas for his own gain, albeit "for a relatively paltry sum". Here, Judas becomes an example of Jesus' followers who think of what they can get out of him, rather than how they can serve him. John Chrysostom links the timing of Judas' action with verse 13 (above):

"Then, when, that is, he heard that this Gospel should be preached everywhere; for that made him afraid, as it was indeed a mark of unspeakable power."

== Jesus celebrates the Passover with his disciples (verses 17–35) ==
As a law-observing Jew, Jesus celebrates his last Passover within Jerusalem, when he institutes the Lord's supper, to connect his sacrificial redemptive act with the 'blood of the covenant' in Exodus 24:8 and Jeremiah 31:31 and the suffering servant of Isaiah. The Passover preparations, Jesus' prediction of betrayal by one of the twelve Apostles, and his anticipated denial by Peter are recorded in this section. Matthew 26:24 is also notable for describing Judas' betrayal by echoing a phrase from 1 Enoch 38:2:

Where then will be the dwelling of the sinners, And where the resting-place of those who have denied the Lord of Spirits? It had been good for them if they had not been born.

== Agony in the garden (verses 36–46) ==
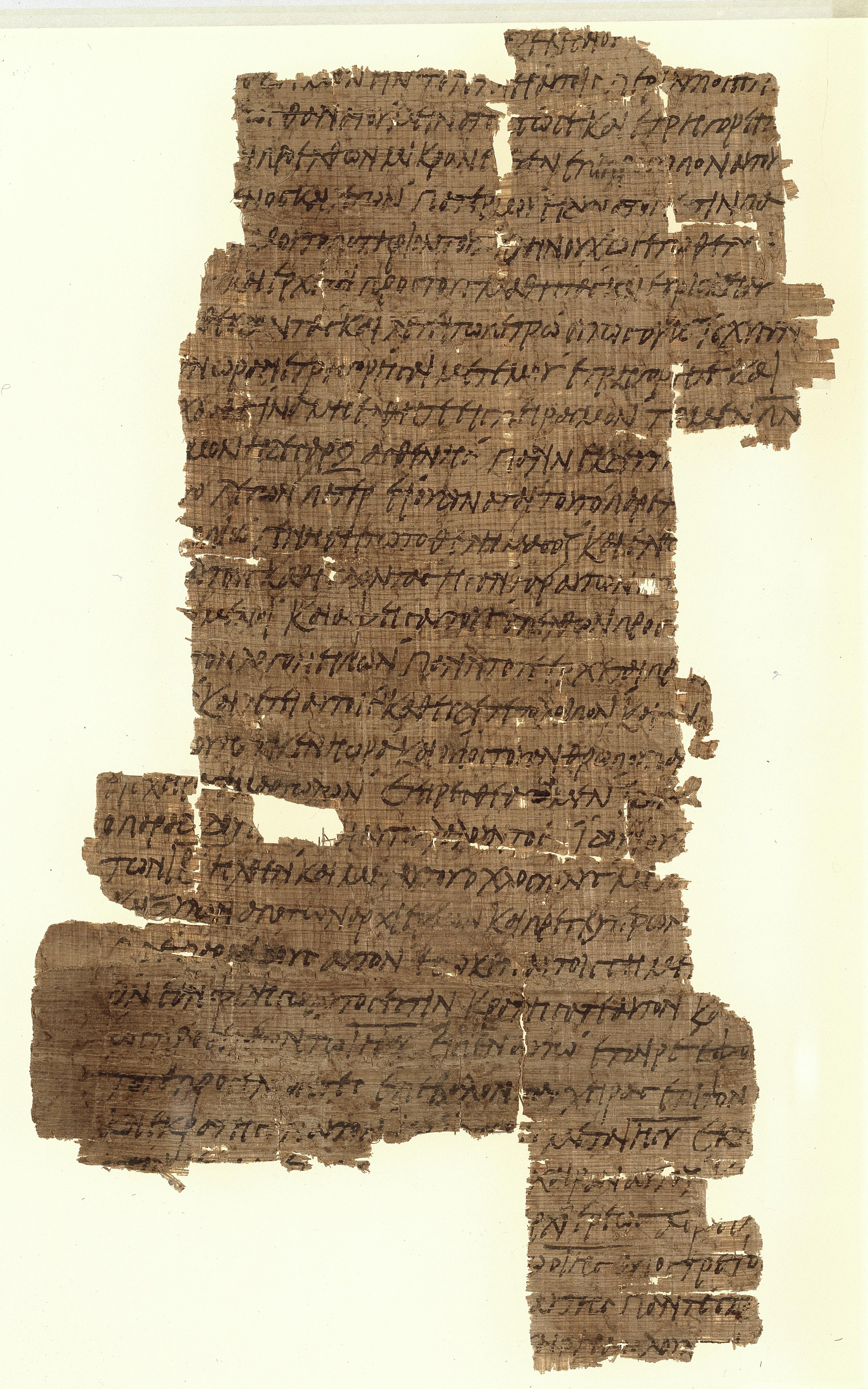
Matthew 26:38–52 on the verso side of Papyrus 37, from AD ~260

Jesus seems to recoil from the impending crucifixion, but he fixes his course to the will of God and 'this overrides whatever feelings he has about death'. The submission to the divine will: "Thy will be done" (verse 42; also in verse 39), alludes to the Lord's Prayer, as do the address "my Father" (verse 39) and the words "that you may not come into the time of trial" (KJV: "enter not into temptation"; verse 41). The garden of Gethsemane is located on the Mount of Olives, where King David once prayed for deliverance from a betrayer (2 Samuel 15:30–31), and a suitable site for his descendant, Jesus, to utter an analogous prayer.

== Betrayal and arrest in Gethsemane (verses 47–56) ==
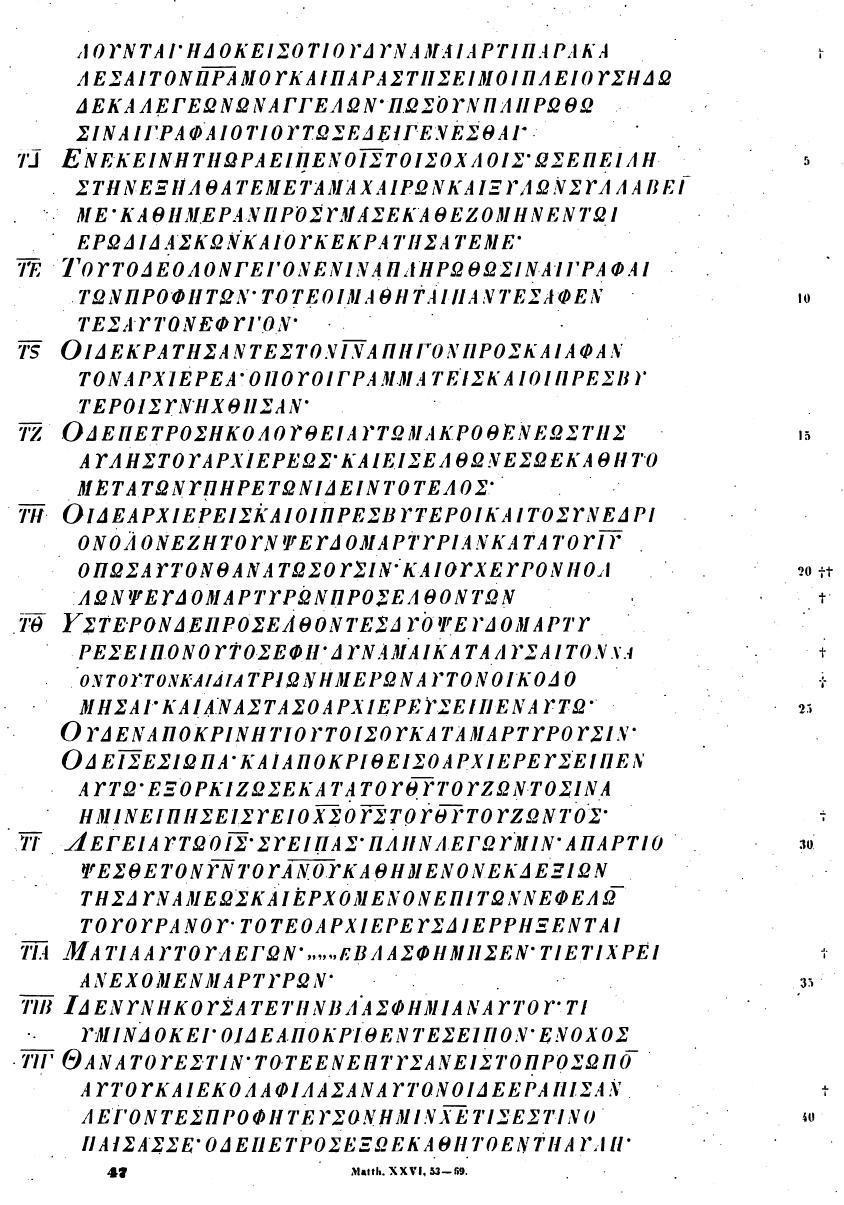
Matthew 26:52–69 on Codex Ephraemi (~ AD 450) in Tischendorf's facsimile edition (1843)

The story of Jesus' arrest involves many people, pulling together 'several strands from previous sections', with Jewish leader plotting to take Jesus 'by stealth and avoid a riot (verse 4; cf. verse 16), Judas' betrayal as Jesus has foretold (verses 21, 25 and 45), the crowd of 'chief priests and the elders of the people (verses 3–5, 14–16) as well as Jesus' predictions of his sufferings.

== Jesus faces the Sanhedrin (verses 57–68) ==
The trial shows that Jesus is not a 'victim of tragic, impersonal circumstances' nor a 'casualty of the ordinary machinery of justice', but a target of attack by wicked people. His enemies 'speak falsehoods (verse 59–60), accuse him of blasphemy (verse 65), condemn him to death (verse 66), viciously hit and mock him (verses 67–68)'. In contrast, Jesus' identity becomes clear as the Messiah and Son of God, who builds the temple (cf. 2 Samuel 7:14), sits at God's right hand and 'the suffering servant of Isaiah 50:6 whose face is spat upon'.

=== Verse 66 ===
"What do you think?"

They answered and said, "He is deserving of death".

In the King James Version, the answer reads "He is guilty of death", guilt referring to the punishment due rather than the crime as in usual English usage.

== Peter denies Jesus, and weeps bitterly (verses 69–75) ==
In the early part of this chapter, Judas defects, then the disciples flee when Jesus was arrested, and now Peter, despite his promise (verse 35), denies that he knows Jesus, forming a 'climax of the disciples' failure'. This passage supplies an ironical balance, when Jesus' prophetic powers are mocked, while the literal fulfillment of his detailed prediction about Peter is precisely taking place. Another balance is in the trial, as Jesus and Peter both faces three sets of accusers: Jesus faces false witnesses in verse 60, the two witnesses in verses 61–62, Caiaphas verses 63–66, while Peter, not far away, verses 69–73, also faces three different persons confronting him about Jesus.

The Gospel of Matthew does not idealize any disciples, but instead, 'presents them as completely human', just as the Old Testament, "the bible of the Matthaean community at that time", does not hide the records of the sins of Noah, Moses, David or Solomon. Allison comments that "God can use ordinary people for his extraordinary purposes and, when they fall into sin, he can grant them forgiveness", and suggests that Matthew's readers would have interpreted the faults of Peter and other disciples as they would have interpreted the failings of Old Testament times.

== See also ==
- Holy Week
- Thirty pieces of silver
- Related Bible parts: Psalm 41, Mark 14, Luke 7, Luke 22; John 12, 13, 18; 1 Corinthians 11

== Source ==
- Allison, Dale C. Jr. (2007). "57. Matthew". In Barton, John; Muddiman, John (eds.). The Oxford Bible Commentary (first (paperback) ed.). Oxford University Press. pp. 844–886. ISBN 978-0199277186.
- Keener, Craig S. (1999). A Commentary on the Gospel of Matthew. Wm. B. Eerdmans Publishing. ISBN 978-0-8028-3821-6.
