= Papyrus 2 =

New Testament papyrus fragment in Greek and Coptic

Papyrus 𝔓^{2}
- New Testament manuscript
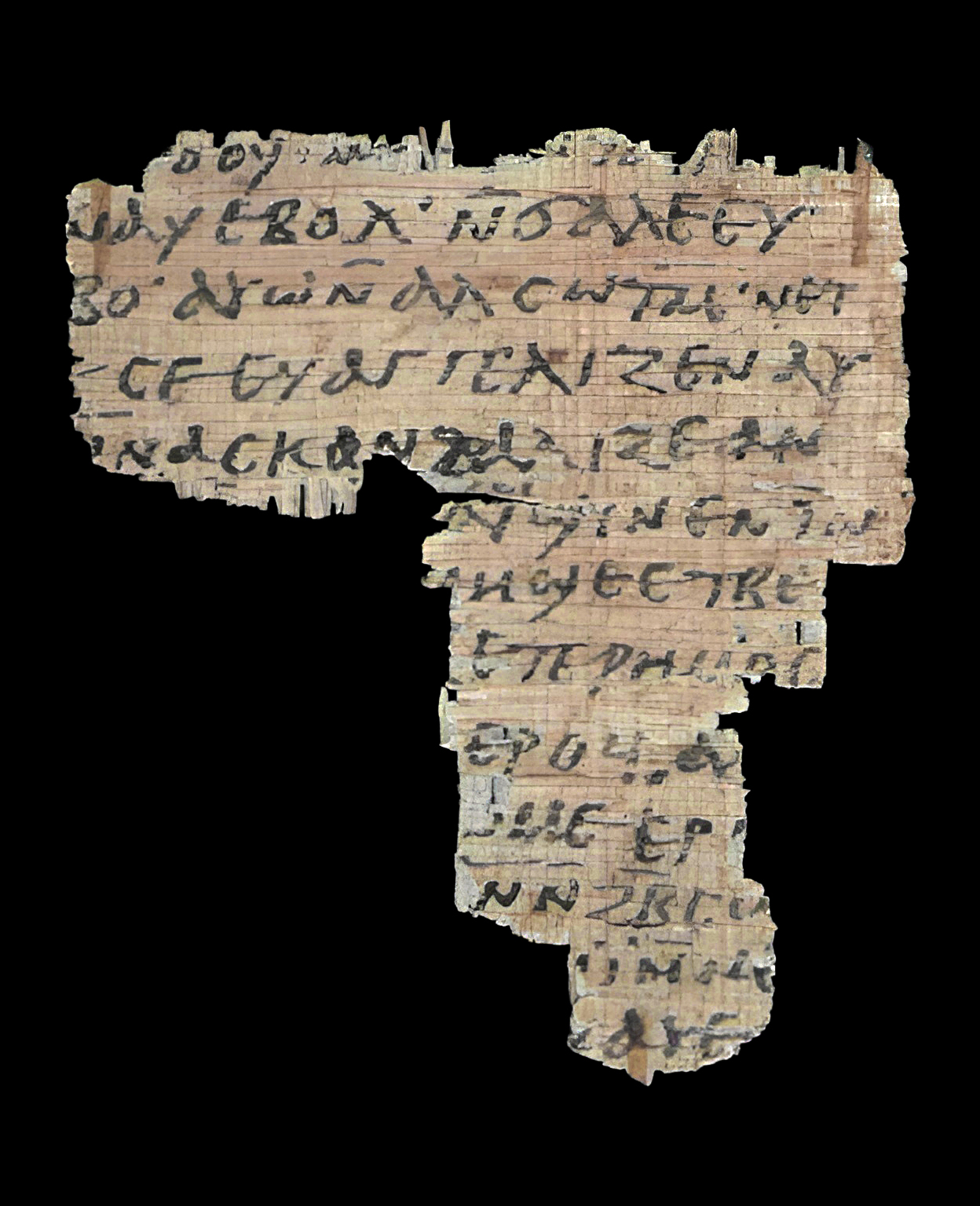
- verso
- Text: John 12:12-15; Luke 7:22-26,50
- Date: c. 500-600
- Found: Egypt
- Now at: Museo Archeologico, Florence, Inv. Nr. 7134
- Cite: E. Pistelli, 'Papiri evangelici', Rivista di Studi Religiosi 6 (1902): 69-70.
- Size: fragment
- Type: mixed (Greek & Coptic)
- Category: III

Papyrus 2 (𝔓^{2}) is an early copy of the New Testament in Greek and Coptic. It is a papyrus fragment of a copy of the Gospel of John dating to the sixth century. It is currently housed at the Egyptian Museum, Florence (Inv. no. 7134). There is a portion of Luke 7:22-26.50 in Coptic on the reverse of the fragment.

The fragment appears to be from a lectionary. The text type is a mixed. Aland placed it in Category III.

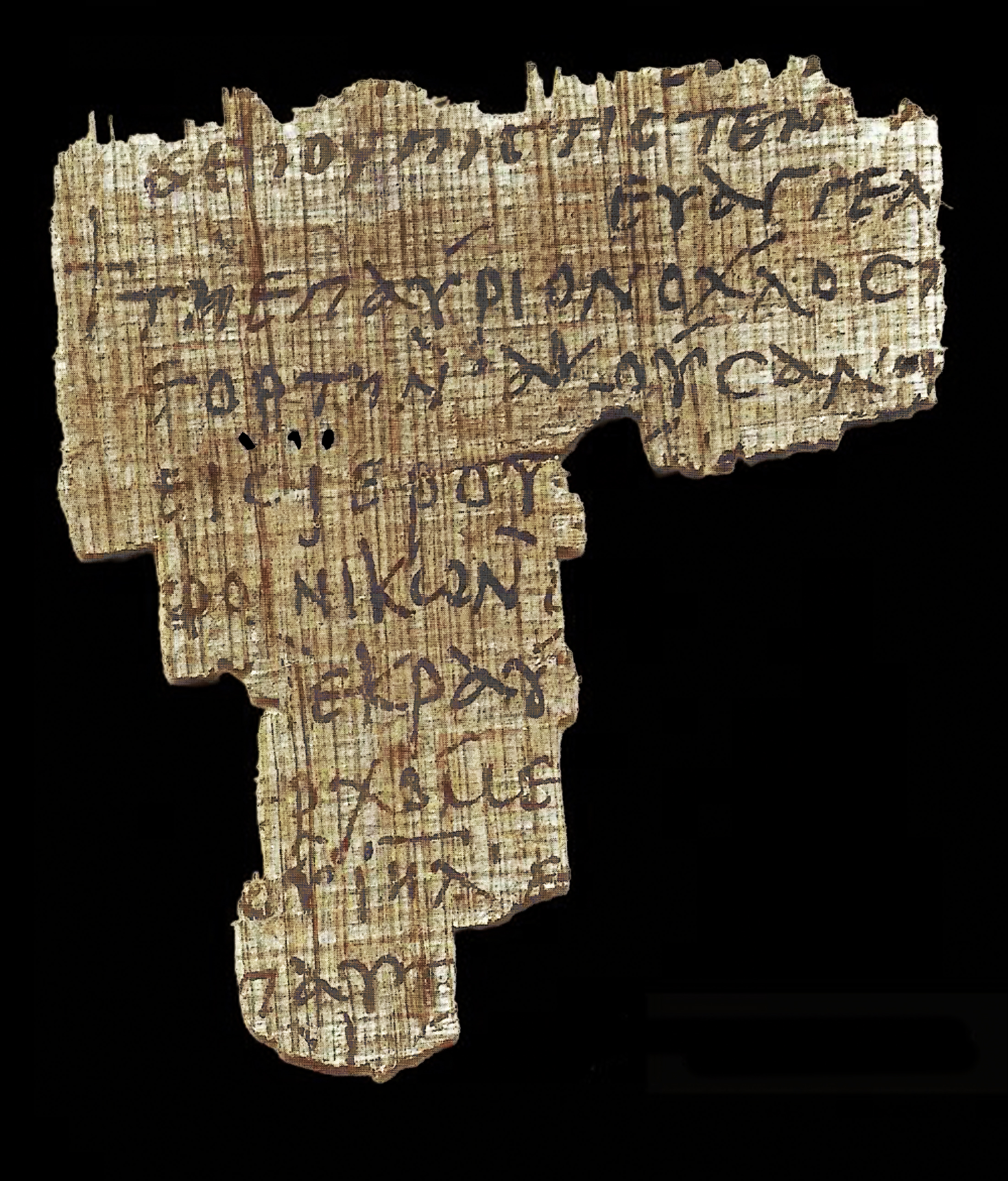
Recto

The name of Jerusalem (usually ιεροσολυμα, Ierosolyma) is given the variant spelling ιερου[σο]λ̣υ̣[μα] (Ierousolyma).

Ermenegildo Pistelli dated the manuscript to the 5th or 6th century; Ernst von Dobschütz to the 6th or 7th century.

== See also ==
- John 12
- List of New Testament papyri
- Luke 7
- New Testament papyrus
- Coptic versions of the Bible
