= Mark 14 =

- ← chapter 13 chapter 15 →
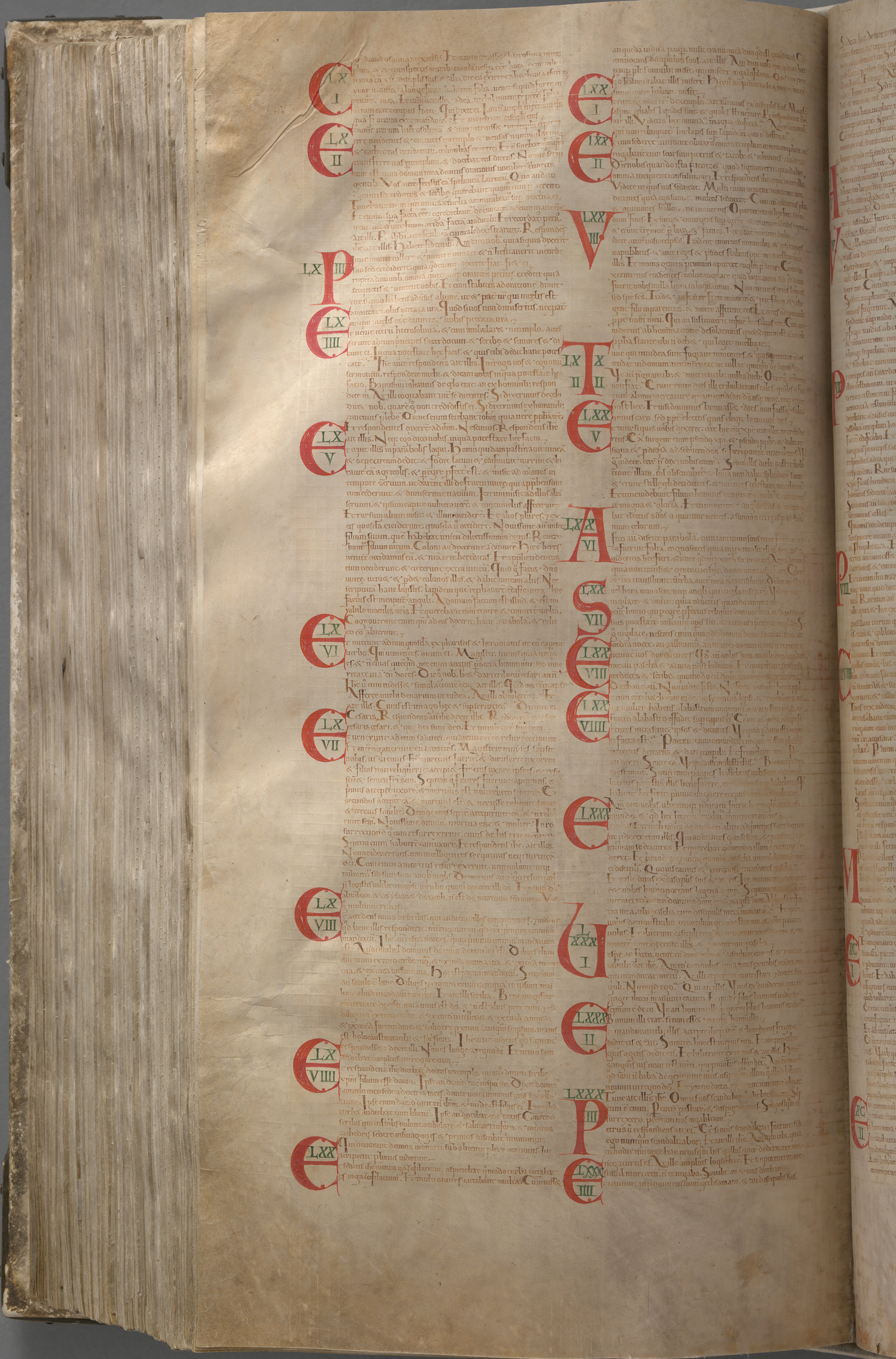
- The Latin text of Mark 11:10–14:32 in Codex Gigas (13th century)
- Book: Gospel of Mark
- Category: Gospel
- Christian Bible part: New Testament
- Order in the Christian part: 2

Mark 14 is the fourteenth chapter of the Gospel of Mark in the New Testament of the Christian Bible. It contains the plot to kill Jesus, his anointing by a woman, the Last Supper, predictions of his betrayal, and Peter the Apostle's three denials of him. It then begins the Passion of Jesus, with the garden of Gethsemane and Judas Iscariot's betrayal and Jesus' arrest, followed by Jesus' trial before the Sanhedrin and Peter's denials of Jesus.

Having 72 verses, this is the longest chapter in Mark's Gospel. The Gospel of Matthew's chapter which covers the same material, Matthew 26, has 75 verses. This chapter's material is presented somewhat differently in Luke 22, which has 71 verses. Jesus' arrest at Gethsemane, his trial, and Peter's denials are found in John 18:1–27.

== Text ==
The original text was written in Koine Greek.

=== Textual witnesses ===
Some early manuscripts containing the text of this chapter are:

- Codex Vaticanus (325–350; complete)
- Codex Sinaiticus (330–360; complete)
- Codex Bezae (~400; complete)
- Codex Alexandrinus (400–440; complete)
- Codex Ephraemi Rescriptus (~450; complete)

=== Old Testament references ===
- Mark 14:27: Zechariah 13:7
- Mark 14:34: Psalm 42:5

== Timescale ==
Mark states at the beginning of this chapter that the Passover was two days away, although Lutheran pietist Johann Bengel argues in his Gnomon of the New Testament that μετὰ δυὸ ἡμέρας (meta duo hēmeras) in Mark 14:1 means "on the following day". If the Passover was on Friday (Good Friday) then the opening events "probably" happened on the Wednesday, the day celebrated by Christians as Holy Wednesday. Verse 12 moves the narrative on to on the first day of Unleavened Bread, the afternoon of the 14th Nisan, and the action continues overnight (verses 27, 30) and concludes the next morning as a rooster crows. Henry Alford notes that "chronological difficulties ... beset this part of the gospel history".

== The plot to kill Jesus and his anointing in Bethany ==
Mark states that the chief priests were looking for a way "by craft", or "by trickery" to arrest Jesus. They determine not to do this during the feast, because they were afraid that the people would riot. Some translations emphasise the proposed subtlety or trickery in the priests' approach; others emphasise that they were looking for secrecy, to avoid popular knowledge of his arrest. Meanwhile, Jesus was in Bethany at the home of Simon the Leper, who has not appeared in this gospel until now. Simon's relationship to Jesus is not explored, but they must have been friends as this appears to have been a social visit. According to the Markan narrative, Jesus is arrested on the following evening.

An unnamed woman, who has a very expensive jar or box of perfume, made of "pure", "expensive" or "genuine" (πιστικῆς, pistikēs) nard, or nard from some specific place, comes and breaks the alabaster jar containing the perfume, and pours it on Jesus' head. Theologian Albert Barnes suggests that she broke the seal of the box, not the actual container. Augustine, in reviewing how this incident fits with John 12:3, where the feet of Jesus were anointed, suggests that both his head and his feet were anointed, and that a person "of a more pious spirit will contend that it was not broken so as to pour out the whole, or else that the feet were anointed before it was broken, so that there remained in the unbroken box enough to anoint the head".

Some unnamed people gathered in the house become angry and say that this is a waste: the perfume could have been sold for 300 denarii and the proceeds given to the poor. Jesus, however, is pleased with her and rebukes her critics:

Why are you bothering her? She has done a beautiful thing to me. The poor you will always have with you, and you can help them any time you want. But you will not always have me. She did what she could. She poured perfume on my body beforehand to prepare for my burial. I tell you the truth, wherever the gospel is preached throughout the world, what she has done will also be told, in memory of her.

— Mark 14:6–9

This story may originally have had a setting independent of the passion narrative: Luke, for example, places a similar story much earlier in Jesus' ministry, in Luke 7:36–50, where a sinful woman anoints Jesus' feet during a dinner with a local Pharisee. Some writers have objected to the statement that the poor will always exist, although Jesus also says you can help them any time you want.

The anticipation of widespread audiences might mean the book was intended for wide distribution and not written solely for a single community.

This begins the final section of Mark, which probably originally ended at Mark 16:8 with the two Marys going to anoint Jesus' dead body and finding that they could not, because he had risen from the dead, an anointing by God. There is no time to anoint him when he is taken down from the cross and his body is not there for the women to anoint three days later (Mark 16:1).

Jesus foreshadows his death and this is the last anointing, an expensive one at that, that he will receive. Mark states in Mark 1:1 that his book is "the good news of Jesus the anointed one", the word Christ meaning "anointed". The woman understands Jesus' importance more than do the other people there. It is also a signal to the reader that as Jesus is being anointed for burial the plot against him will succeed. (Brown 145)

According to John 12:1–11 Jesus' feet were anointed by Lazarus' sister Mary on the previous Saturday before he entered Jerusalem and that it was Judas who objected to her using the perfume because he was stealing from the money they used for the poor. The website "Catholic Online" states that this incident occurred "six days before" the passover, at Simon the Leper's house.

Judas then leaves and goes to the priests and gives up Jesus. The priests are so grateful that they pay Judas for his service. Mark then says that Judas looked for the right time to betray Jesus. The planning for Judas' betrayal of Jesus "is told starkly and briefly here. It is elaborated considerably in the other gospels". According to Matthew, the payment was thirty silver coins. Mark does not state Judas' reason for betraying Jesus, but has this occur immediately after the anointing, perhaps showing a causal link.

According to Luke's account, Satan took possession of Judas and caused him to do these things. John says Satan "prompted" Judas to do this.

== The Last Supper ==
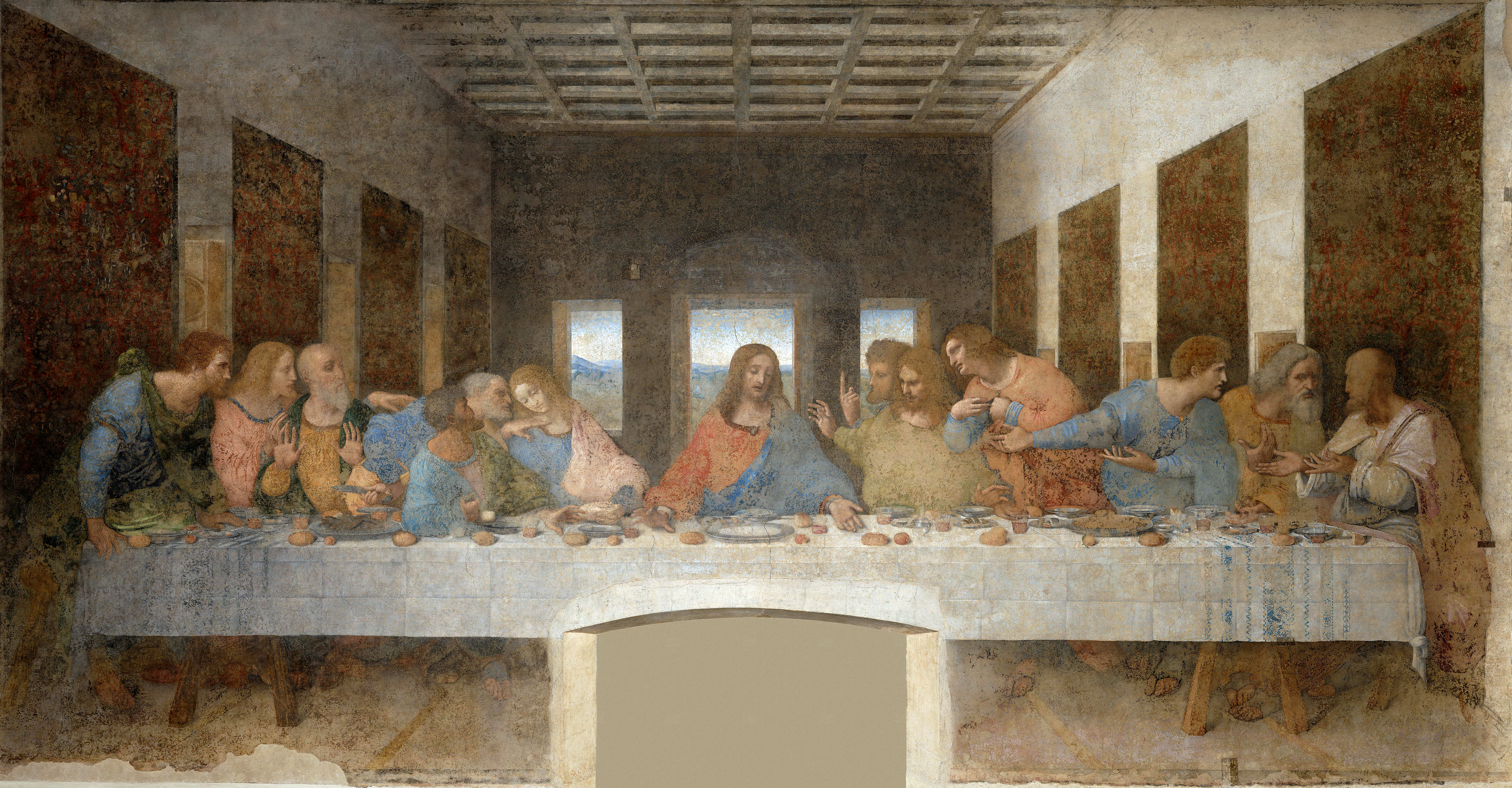
The Last Supper (L'Ultima Cena) by Leonardo da Vinci

The next day (the day now celebrated as Holy Thursday), Jesus' disciples ask him where they should go to prepare the Passover meal. Passover is the celebration of God "passing over" the houses of the Israelite slaves but killing the firstborn son of every Egyptian house in Exodus 12:29 during the Ten Plagues. It was celebrated in tandem with the feast of Unleavened Bread. The disciples ask where Jesus ("you") will eat the passover (Ancient Greek: ἵνα φάγῃς τὸ πάσχα, hina phagēs to pascha), whereas in Luke's parallel text they ask where "we" will eat it (φάγωμεν, phagōmen).

Mark says this is on the first day of the Feast and the day the Jews sacrificed the Passover lamb. The lamb was killed on the fourteenth day of the Hebrew month of Nisan, making Jesus' death the following day on the fifteenth, Passover. Mark states that the lamb was sacrificed on the first day of the feast, having the dinner on the same day as the sacrifice of the lamb. This would be correct from our modern notion of a day beginning at Midnight, but the Jewish day began at sundown and so the Passover dinner from their point of view occurred the day after the sacrifice. Either Mark is using a non-Jewish reckoning of time or is using his method of double time chronology, such as 1:32, where two temporally separated events are sandwiched together. The other synoptic gospels agree with Mark on this chronology. John 19:14 however has Jesus' death occur during the slaughter of the Passover lamb, making his death the fourteenth and thus the Last Supper on the thirteenth and so not the Passover meal.

He tells two unnamed disciples to go to the "city": although Mark does not state which city, it was clearly Jerusalem, about two miles from Bethany, as after the meal they go to the Mount of Olives. According to tradition the meal took place in the Room of the Last Supper on Mount Zion just outside Jerusalem. This was an area with a large Essene community, which has led some scholars to speculate about a link between Jesus and that group.

Jesus tells them they will be met by "a man carrying a jar of water" (13) and that he will lead them to another man's house. They are to ask the house's owner where "the teacher" has a guest room and that the man will show them the upper room in the house and that is where they are to have dinner. They do as he said and everything happens as he said it would and they "...prepared the Passover." (16) This episode shows Jesus' power over the situation. The owner of the house seems to know Jesus as "teacher", perhaps indicating that he was an unnamed disciple.

Jesus and the Twelve Apostles arrive. Mark says it was evening. As the new Jewish day began at sundown, this is now the Passover and this is the Passover meal. This is the day of Jesus' death, Good Friday. Jesus tells the group that one of the Apostles eating dinner with him will betray him. The Apostles are saddened and all of them say one at a time that it is not them. "'It is one of the Twelve,' he replied, 'one who dips bread into the bowl with me. The Son of Man will go just as it is written about him. But woe to that man who betrays the Son of Man! It would be better for him if he had not been born.'" (20–21) In Mark, Jesus does not state who will be the betrayer. According to Matthew, Judas denied it was him, to which Jesus replied that Judas is indeed the one he is talking about. According to John, Jesus gave Judas some bread as a signal that Judas was the betrayer and that Judas was possessed by Satan and that Jesus told him to leave to go and betray him.

No passage of the Old Testament speaks of the Son of Man's suffering, so Jesus might be saying his death is somehow the glory predicted for the Son of Man. Jesus also predicted his betrayal in Mark 9:31 and 10:33 By predicting this Jesus says that Judas' betrayal is preordained, but that he will be punished for his behavior nevertheless. This has raised issues of determinism and the justice of God. If Judas had no choice in what he was to do, why should he be punished? What exactly his punishment is not stated, and it does not say in any of the Gospels if Judas is in hell. Both John and Luke have Judas possessed by Satan. The recently released, and still largely unstudied, Gospel of Judas also has Judas betray Jesus to the priests for payment but has this as much more of the divine plan.

Later Jesus takes some bread and divides it up and gives thanks and gives the pieces to the disciples. He tells them "Take it; this is my body." (22) He then does the same with a cup of wine and passes it around to everyone. "'This is my blood of the covenant, which is poured out for many,' he said to them. 'I tell you the truth, I will not drink again of the fruit of the vine until that day when I drink it anew in the kingdom of God.'" (24-25)

This might be related to Isaiah 53:12 in his description of the suffering servant. The original covenant was a blood sacrifice Moses made to God to seal God's deal with the Israelites before Moses went up to receive the Ten Commandments in Exodus 24:8. Blood was a symbol of life in the Jewish culture. (Kilgallen 267) Jesus does not state that the bread and wine are like him, but are his body and blood. Jesus is asking his disciples to take part in his sacrificial death. (Brown et al. 626) (See also Transubstantiation) Mark uses the term hyper pollōn (for many), based on the Hebrew of Isaiah 53:12 with "many" being all people, not just the disciples (Brown et al. 626). This episode in contrasted with the predictions of his betrayal and Peter's denials, showing the sacrificial nature of his offering. Taking Jesus' body as food shows him as sustainer and a source of strength. (Kilgallen 266) (See also John 6:48–66) They then sing a hymn, "in all probability the concluding portion of the Hallel", and leave and return to the Mount of Olives. The singing of hymns on Passover was a way of giving thanks. (Kilgallen 268) According to Luke, Jesus told everyone to take a purse, a bag, and two swords with them (see also But to bring a sword).

During the Passover meal the wine was usually consumed during the eating of the bread, but here it occurs after, probably the third cup of wine, known as the "Cup of Blessing", which the head of the household handed round to each person. Brown suggests this might indicate this is not the official Passover dinner and more in line with John's chronology.

On the Mount of Olives, Jesus predicts his abandonment by the Apostles: "'You will all fall away,' Jesus told them, 'for it is written: 'I will strike the shepherd, and the sheep will be scattered.' But after I have risen, I will go ahead of you into Galilee.'" (27–28) This is what the man dressed in white tells the two Marys when they find him in Jesus' opened tomb in Mark 16:7. The writing that Jesus is quoting is Zechariah 13:7.

Peter, "ardent and impulsive as ever", then says he will not desert Jesus, even if all the others do. Jesus tells him that on that very night Peter will disown Jesus three times before the rooster crows twice in the morning. Peter refutes it and says he will follow Jesus even if it means his own death, and the other Apostles do the same.

Mark only has the straightforward, unexplained, eucharistic section sandwiched between two predictions of betrayal. This simplicity might indicate Mark's audience already knew the story of the Last Supper in greater detail than Mark relates. (Miller 47) Matthew has almost the same details, but Luke and John give longer accounts of the meal.

John has the longest account of the Last Supper in chapters 13–14. John also has Jesus' predictions of his betrayal and Peter's denials but no eucharistic ritual and has Jesus washing his disciples feet and much more of what he told them at dinner. John then has a lengthy prayer and discourse after the dinner in John 15, 16, and 17.

Paul also gives a description of the Last Supper in 1 Corinthians 11:23–26, stating that Jesus gave bread as his body and wine as his blood on the night he was betrayed. This is one of the few details of Jesus' life, apart from his crucifixion and resurrection, that Paul gives in his letters.

== The garden of Gethsemane ==
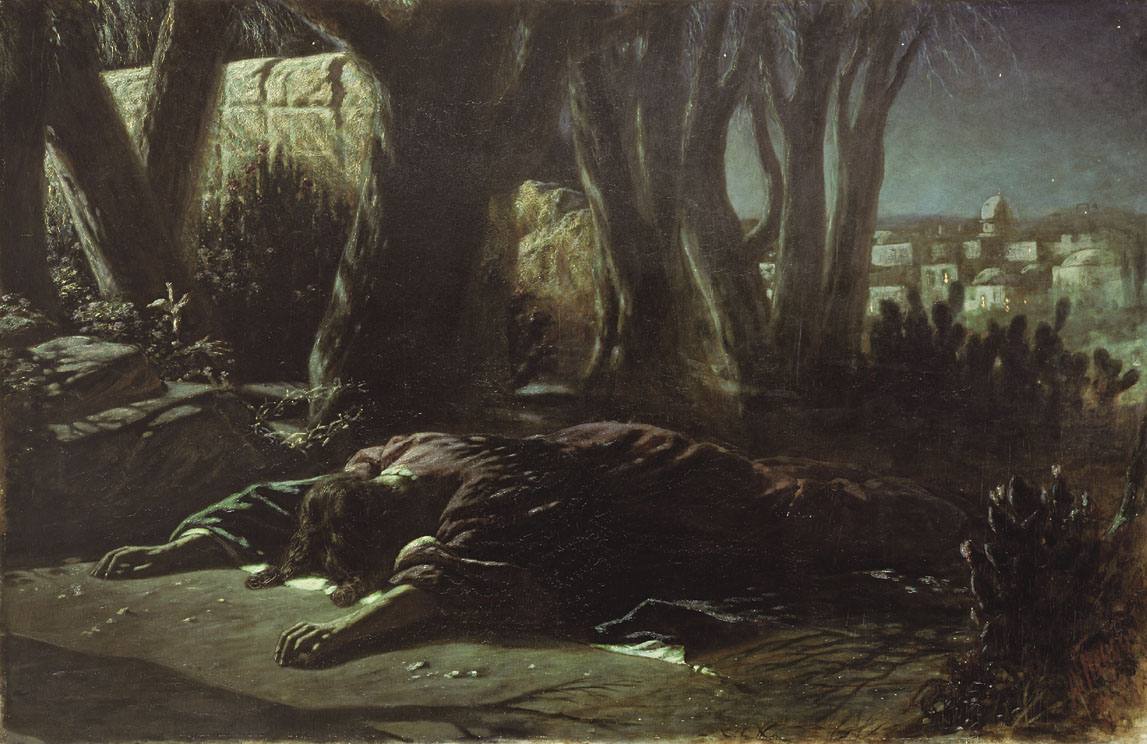
Gethsemane by Wassilij Grigorjewitsch Perow

They travel to Gethsemane, probably an olive grove, which is located at the edge of the Kidron Valley on the eastern side of Jerusalem. Jesus asks the group to wait for him as he goes and prays. According to John and Luke, Jesus and the disciples had met there often. Mark does not say whether or not Judas was with the group at this point but, according to John, he left the group during dinner at Jesus' request. He takes Peter, James, and John with him. Along the way he says he is so sad he could die and tells them to keep watch and then walks off by himself and prays.

He asks God to grant him a reprieve from what he is about to undergo. "'Abba, Father,' he said, 'everything is possible for you. Take this cup from me. Yet not what I will, but what you will.'" (36) He mentioned the cup he had to drink in Mark 10:39. Jesus, after his three predictions of his Passion in Mark 8:31, 9:31, and 10:33–34, now says that he wants to live, but then tells God to do whatever God wants, submitting to God's will. Jesus shows total confidence in God, first seeming to say that God can change his plans even at this point if he wishes, and secondly that whatever God decides is the right decision. (Kilgallen 270)

He goes back and finds the three asleep and asks them why they could not even stay awake an hour and tells them to pray to avoid "temptation". Temptation might be tempted to fall asleep. In Matthew 6:13 during the Sermon on the Mount he speaks of the temptation of evil, which might be what he is referring to here. He goes back and asks God the same thing, then returns to find them asleep again. They wake up, say nothing, and Jesus leaves for a third time and returns and tells them to get up because the "hour has come" for him to be betrayed.

The number three occurs a significant number of times here. Jesus travels with three disciples, and leaves and prays three times. He has predicted all this will occur three times. Some have seen the occurrence of three a divine symbol, others a sign of Mark's narrative ability. The use of three is perhaps indicative of an oral source for Mark, as three is a common feature of orally transmitted stories, such as jokes (So Jesus, Muhammad, and Buddha walk into a bar...). (Brown 145) Matthew has him leave and return three times but Luke seems to say he only went away once, and that he was visited by an angel and his sweat became "...like drops of blood...", perhaps a symptom of hematidrosis.

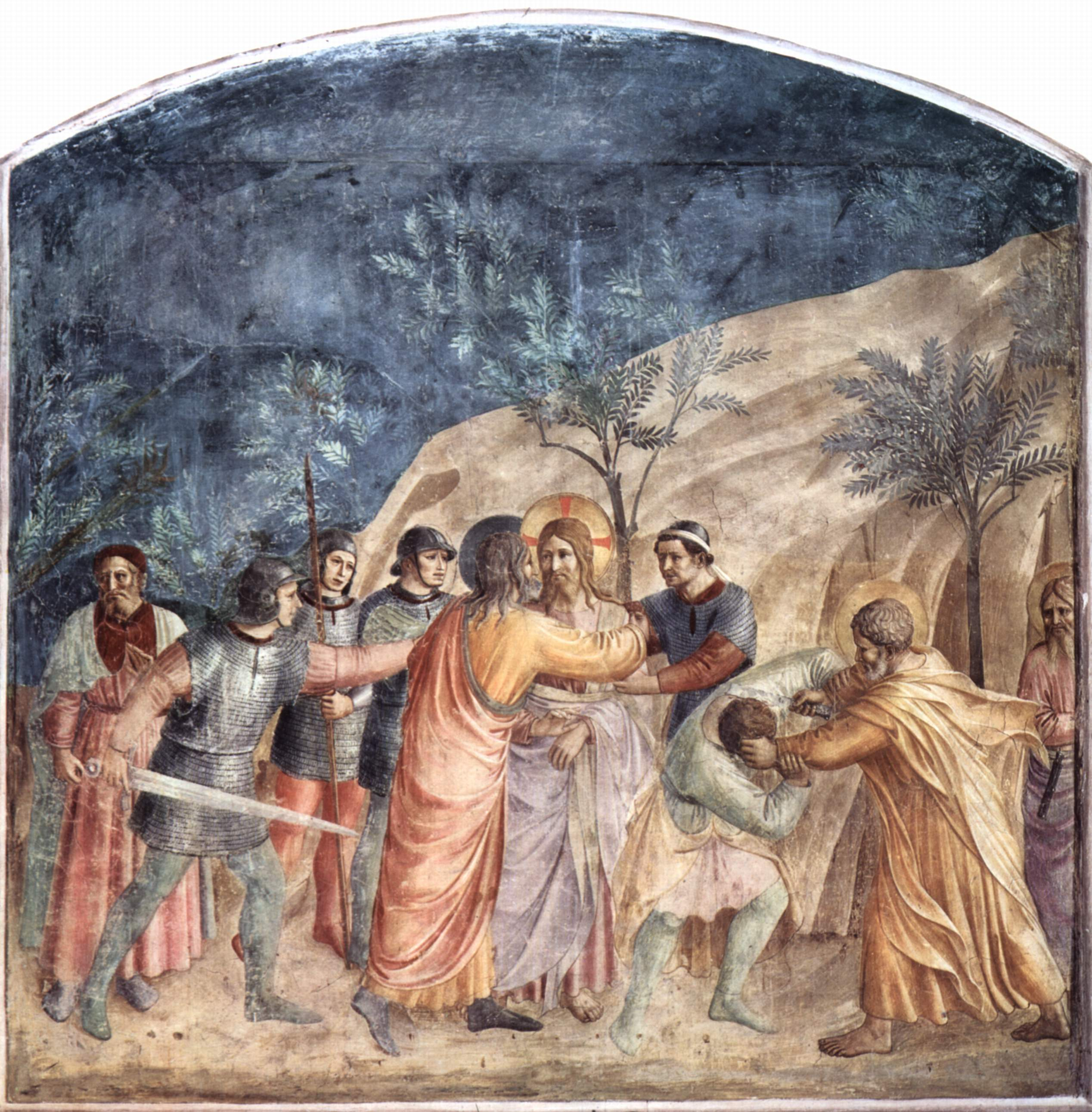
The Capture of Christ, with Judas and Peter, who cut off the ear of the servant Malchus by Fra Angelico

Judas arrives along with a crowd sent by the priests, teachers, and elders. Who exactly this crowd is Mark does not say, but the Sanhedrin did have a Temple police force (Kilgallen 271). According to John, Judas came with soldiers and men from the Sanhedrin. Judas comes and kisses Jesus, which Mark says was a prearranged sign between Judas and the others. A kiss was a traditional greeting given to a teacher (Brown et al. 626) All the other Gospels have Jesus respond to Judas.

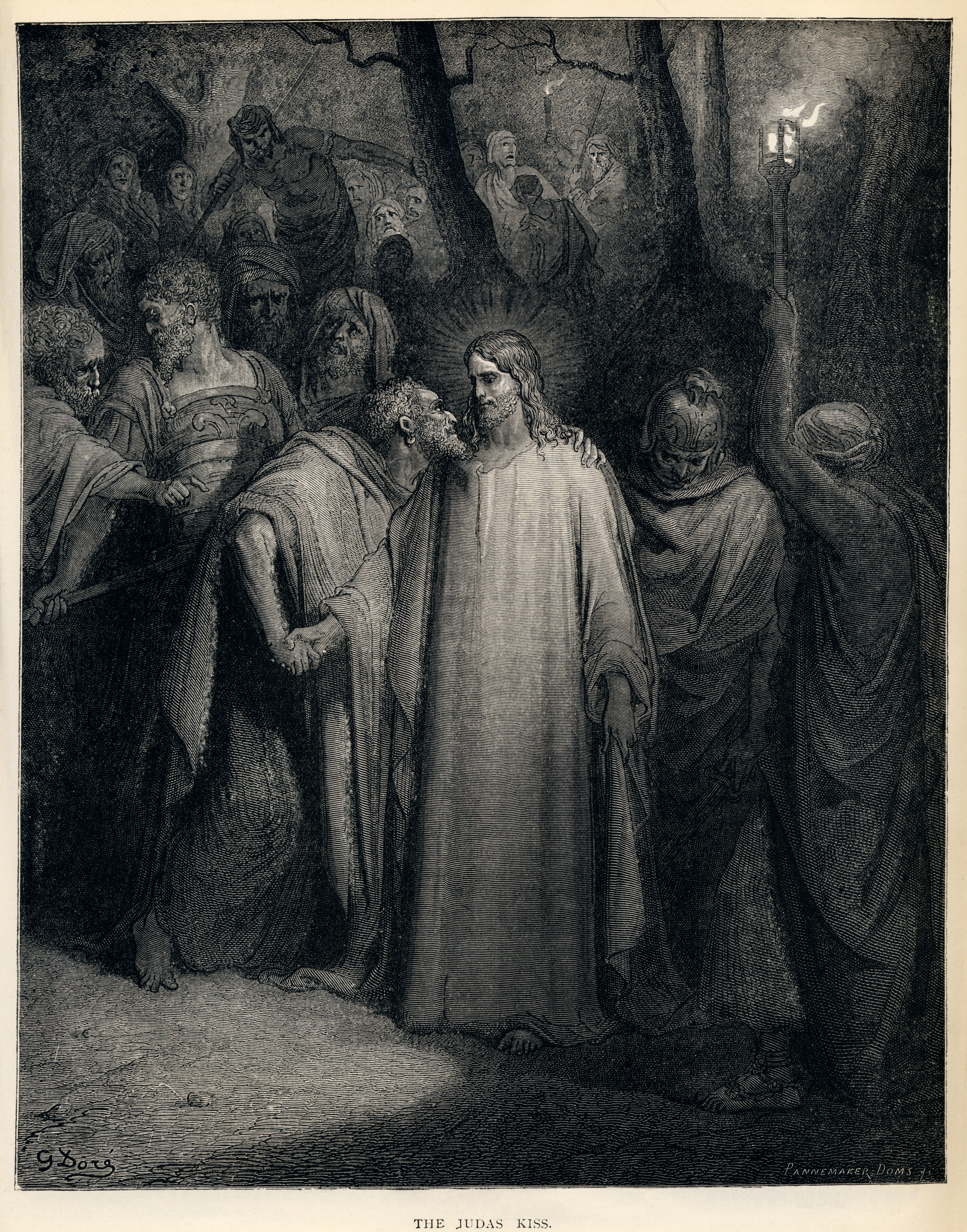
"The Judas Kiss" (1866) by Gustave Doré

The men grab Jesus and an unnamed person there takes his sword and attacks one of the high priests' men and cuts off his ear. Matthew and Luke say it was done by an unnamed disciple. According to John, Peter was the one who cut off the man's ear, who John says was a servant of the high priest Caiaphas named Malchus. According to Luke Jesus healed the man. All the other Gospels, but not Mark, have Jesus telling his disciples to stop resisting his arrest.

"Am I leading a rebellion", said Jesus, "that you have come out with swords and clubs to capture me? Every day I was with you, teaching in the temple courts, and you did not arrest me. But the Scriptures must be fulfilled." Then everyone deserted him and fled. (48–50)

Despite the fact that all the disciples swore never to leave him, they all quickly abandon him here. Mark (alone among the evangelists) then relates that there was a young man who was a follower (Ancient Greek: τις συνηκολουθει αυτω, tis synēkolouthei autō) of Jesus, who was wearing "nothing but a linen garment"; he was seized by the crowd, and he left his clothes behind and fled away naked (see also Naked fugitive). Barnes argues that he was not a disciple, but "he may have been the owner of the garden". Some writers, for example Bishop Tom Wright, think this might be a self-reference to Mark himself. Others think it might refer to the man mentioned in the disputed Secret Gospel of Mark or the man in the white robe found at Jesus' tomb. He could be a metaphor for the disciples, who are now naked in the world after abandoning Jesus. German theologian Paul Schanz suggested that Mark included this incident out of "a desire to exhibit in a concrete instance the danger of the situation, and the ferocity of the enemies of Jesus".

Judas is not mentioned again by Mark. According to Matthew 27:5, Judas hanged himself after trying to give back the money to the priests but then putting it in the Temple. According to Acts of the Apostles 1:18 Judas took his money and bought a field, where he "fell" and died, which might or might not be hanging.

== Trial before the Sanhedrin ==
Jesus is taken to the chief priests, elders, and teachers. This body was not fixed during Jesus' time, but usually an ad hoc gathering of aristocrats and important religious officials (Brown 146). This occurs in Mark at the high priest's house. There were about eight chief priests and several more elders and teachers and scribes. (Kilgallen 255) Peter follows from a distance and goes into the high priest's courtyard and stands around the fire with the guards.

According to Mark, this is a secret trial at night, a rarity, and the high priest's house must have been exceedingly large to house the entire ruling body. Daniel J. Harrington argues that it was more likely that this was a small first preliminary hearing and not a full trial. He also argues that Mark might be trying to increase the perception of Jewish involvement in Jesus' death and lessen the responsibility of Rome. (Brown et al. 627)

Matthew also reports this as a full trial at night. John also has this at the high priest's house, though he is questioned by the high priest's father-in-law, Annas, first and whether Caiaphas led a trial of him or not is not stated, only that Caiaphas took Jesus to Pilate. Luke records Jesus being beaten at the high priest's house and the trial starting the following morning.

The Sanhedrin tries to find evidence against Jesus but according to Mark does not, only false testimony, including that Jesus claimed he would destroy the Temple building. Mark says that the witnesses did not agree with each other. Multiple witnesses to a crime are required under Jewish law according to Deuteronomy 19:15.

The high priest, unnamed in Mark but surely Caiaphas, asks Jesus himself about what people have said about him but he does not answer. He then asks Jesus directly if he is the "...Christ, the Son of the Blessed One?" "'I am', said Jesus, 'and you will see the Son of Man sitting at the right hand of the Mighty One and coming on the clouds of heaven.'" (61–62) According to Matthew, Jesus answered "Yes, it is as you say"; according to Luke, he said "You are right in saying I am".

The high priest tears at his clothes and declares that this statement is blasphemy and asks everyone what they think. Blasphemy is defined in Leviticus 24:10–16. They all condemn him and spit on him and then blindfold him and punch him and mock him, telling him to prophesy. The guards then take him and beat him.

Jesus has predicted all this will happen so Mark might be using this ironically to have Jesus condemned as a false prophet at the same moment his prophecies are coming true (Brown et al. 627) Mark states the entire group condemned Jesus, but states in 15:43 that Joseph of Arimathea, a member of the council, was perhaps a secret disciple and took possession of Jesus' body. Did he condemn Jesus as well? Luke 23:51 states that he did not.

Jesus finally declaring he is the Son of God at the moment it is used to condemn him shows the centrality of the Passion to Jesus' status as messiah. (Kilgallen 274) During this trial and the next, Jesus hardly gives any defense at all except his proclamations he is the messiah and the Son of God and the King of the Jews. Many have seen a link with this and Isaiah 53:7. He gives a short defense and a different less direct declaration of being the messiah in John.

The main accusations against Jesus center around the Temple, not Jesus' disagreements with Jewish law. Many scholars believe that it was the incident in the Temple in Mark 11:12–18 that initiated the governmental action against Jesus.

== Peter's denials ==
Peter is in the courtyard below. According to John he was there with another unnamed disciple. One of the high priest's servant girls walks by him and says that Peter too had been with Jesus. He says he does not know what she is talking about. According to John he denied he knew Jesus to her to gain entry to the courtyard. He walks away to the entryway but she yells to those around him that he is one of Jesus' followers, which he denies. The people around him seem to know he is from Galilee and assume he's with Jesus and start to curse him. According to Matthew, they recognized his accent. He denies knowing Jesus a third time as he hears the second crowing of a rooster. Peter remembers what Jesus had told him and he breaks down crying.

According to John, he was recognized by a man who was in the garden earlier, who John says was a relative of Malchus. This occurs at the same time as Jesus' proclamations of being the messiah, contrasting Jesus' faithfulness with Peter's lack of it. Peter's denial's, since Jesus had predicted them, only show Jesus' power even more clearly.

== See also ==
- Anointing of Jesus
- Arrest of Jesus
- Judas Iscariot
- Last Supper
- Naked fugitive
- Sanhedrin Trial of Jesus
- Simon Peter

Preceded by Mark 13	Chapters of the Bible; Gospel of Mark	Succeeded by Mark 15
