= Anointing of Jesus =

Gospels event

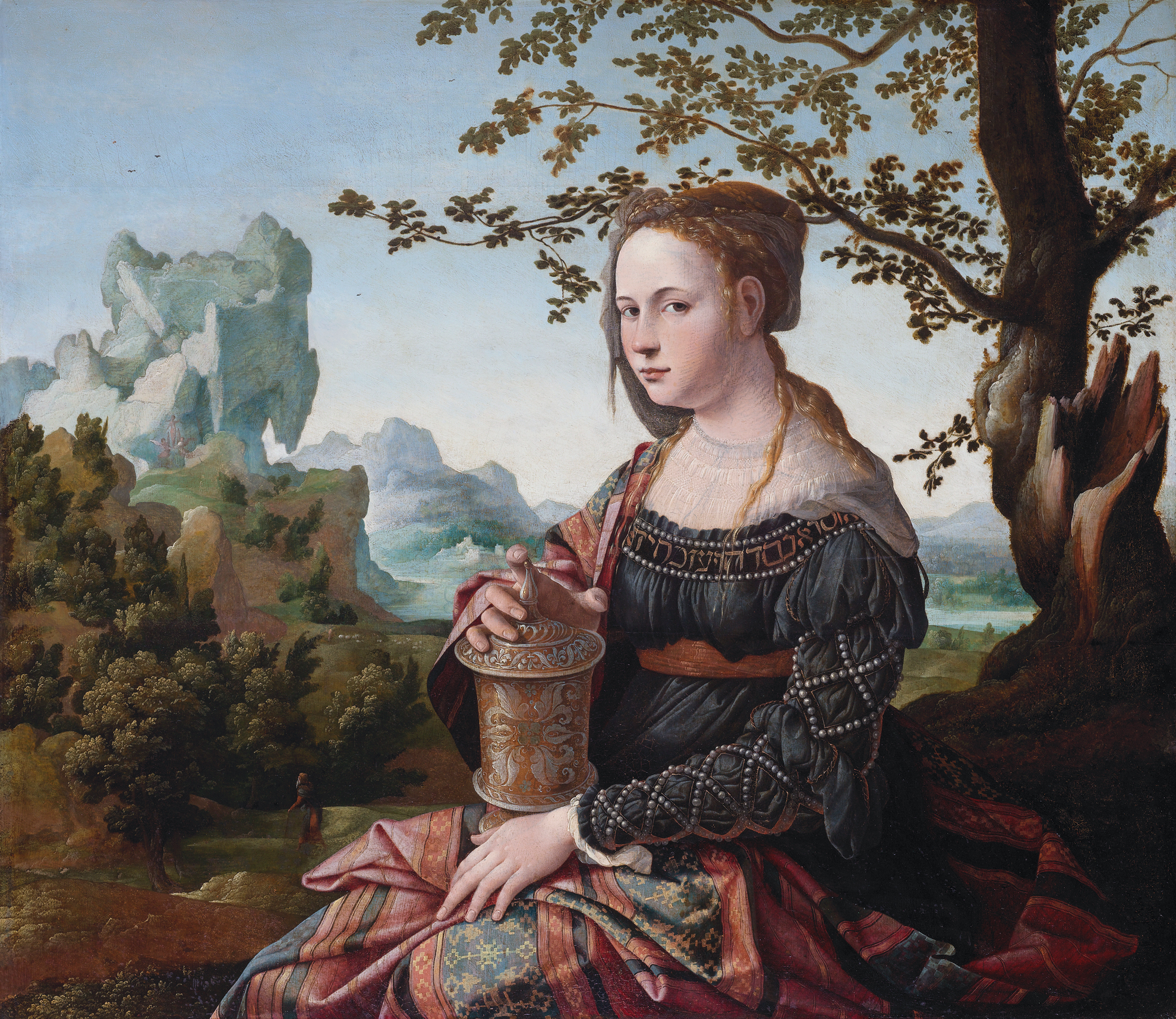
Mary Magdalene is traditionally depicted with a vessel of ointment, in reference to the Anointing of Jesus.

The anointings of Jesus's head or feet are events recorded in the four gospels. The account in Matthew 26, Mark 14, takes place on Holy Wednesday, while the account in John 12 takes place 6 days before Passover in Bethany, a village in Judaea on the southeastern slope of the Mount of Olives, where Lazarus lived. In Matthew and Mark, he is anointed by an unnamed woman. In John, the woman is identified as Mary of Bethany, the sister of Martha and Lazarus of Bethany. The event in Luke features an unnamed sinful woman, and is in the northern region, as Luke 7 indicates Jesus was ministering in the northern regions of Nain and Capernaum. The honorific anointing with perfume is an action frequently mentioned in other literature from the time; however, using long hair to dry Jesus's feet, as in John and Luke, is not recorded elsewhere, and should be regarded as an exceptional gesture. Considerable debate has discussed the identity of the woman, the location, timing, and the message.

== Gospel accounts ==
The event (or events – see discussion below) is reported in Matthew 26, Mark 14, Luke 7, and John 12. Matthew and Mark are very similar:

Matthew 26:6–13

While Jesus was in Bethany in the home of Simon the Leper, a woman came to him with an alabaster jar of very expensive perfume, which she poured on his head as he was reclining at the table. When the disciples saw this, they were indignant. "Why this waste?" they asked. "This perfume could have been sold at a high price and the money given to the poor." Aware of this, Jesus said to them, "Why are you bothering this woman? She has done a beautiful thing to me. The poor you will always have with you, but you will not always have me. When she poured this perfume on my body, she did it to prepare me for burial. Truly I tell you, wherever this gospel is preached throughout the world, what she has done will also be told, in memory of her."

Mark 14:3–9

While he was in Bethany, reclining at the table in the home of Simon the Leper, a woman came with an alabaster jar of very expensive perfume, made of pure nard. She broke the jar and poured the perfume on his head. Some of those present were saying indignantly to one another, "Why this waste of perfume? It could have been sold for more than a year's wages (Note: Greek: three hundred denarii) and the money given to the poor." And they rebuked her harshly. "Leave her alone," said Jesus. "Why are you bothering her? She has done a beautiful thing to me. The poor you will always have with you, and you can help them any time you want. But you will not always have me. She did what she could. She poured perfume on my body beforehand to prepare for my burial. Truly I tell you, wherever the gospel is preached throughout the world, what she has done will also be told, in memory of her."

Luke 7:36–50

When one of the Pharisees invited Jesus to have dinner with him, he went to the Pharisee's house and reclined at the table. A woman in that town who lived a sinful life learned that Jesus was eating at the Pharisee's house, so she came there with an alabaster jar of perfume. As she stood behind him at his feet weeping, she began to wet his feet with her tears. Then she wiped them with her hair, kissed them and poured perfume on them. When the Pharisee who had invited him saw this, he said to himself, "If this man were a prophet, he would know who is touching him and what kind of woman she is—that she is a sinner." Jesus answered him, "Simon, I have something to tell you." "Tell me, teacher," he said. "Two people owed money to a certain moneylender. One owed him five hundred denarii, (Note: A denarius was the usual daily wage of a day laborer.) and the other fifty. Neither of them had the money to pay him back, so he forgave the debts of both. Now which of them will love him more?" Simon replied, "I suppose the one who had the bigger debt forgiven." "You have judged correctly," Jesus said. Then he turned toward the woman and said to Simon, "Do you see this woman? I came into your house. You did not give me any water for my feet, but she wet my feet with her tears and wiped them with her hair. You did not give me a kiss, but this woman, from the time I entered, has not stopped kissing my feet. You did not put oil on my head, but she has poured perfume on my feet. Therefore, I tell you, her many sins have been forgiven—as her great love has shown. But whoever has been forgiven little loves little." Then Jesus said to her, "Your sins are forgiven." The other guests began to say among themselves, "Who is this who even forgives sins?" Jesus said to the woman, "Your faith has saved you; go in peace."

John 12:1–8

Six days before the Passover, Jesus came to Bethany, where Lazarus lived, whom Jesus had raised from the dead. Here a dinner was given in Jesus' honor. Martha served, while Lazarus was among those reclining at the table with him. Then Mary took about a pint of pure nard, an expensive perfume; she poured it on Jesus' feet and wiped his feet with her hair. And the house was filled with the fragrance of the perfume. But one of his disciples, Judas Iscariot, who was later to betray him, objected, "Why wasn't this perfume sold and the money given to the poor? It was worth a year's wages." He did not say this because he cared about the poor but because he was a thief; as keeper of the money bag, he used to help himself to what was put into it. "Leave her alone," Jesus replied. "It was intended that she should save this perfume for the day of my burial. You will always have the poor among you, but you will not always have me."

== Description ==
=== Location ===
Alleged locations where women are said to have anointed Jesus in some way

Mark, Matthew, and John all place the incident in Bethany, a village in Judea. Mark and Matthew specify that it occurred at the home of Simon the Leper. Luke 7:36 states that Jesus had been invited to dinner at the home of Simon the Pharisee. Luke 7:39 makes clear that the sinful woman was living in the town/city (Greek: ἐν τῇ πόλει, en têi pólei) Jesus was staying in; the preceding narrative of the raising of the son of the widow of Nain (7:11–17) makes clear that this polis (translated in English as 'town' or 'city') was Nain. Luke 7:11–17 labels Nain a polis three times, in verses 7:11 and 7:12. On the other hand, the unnamed place where Mary and Martha live in Luke 10:38–42 is labelled a 'village' (Greek: κώμη, kómé) in verse 10:38. Luke therefore linguistically connects the sinful woman to the (larger) town/city of Nain, and distinguishes the unnamed place of Mary and Martha as a (smaller) village. Luke 7's "sinful woman" lived in Nain, but the Mary referred to in Luke 10 lived in a village somewhere else in Galilee, and the Mary referred to in John 11 and 12 lived in Bethany, Judea, so most modern scholars agree that they are three different characters, and there is no reason to assume that the sinful woman was named "Mary" as well. Finally, the hosts receiving Jesus at their house seem to be four different characters across the stories: Simon the Leper in Mark and Matthew, Simon the Pharisee in Luke 7, Martha in Luke 10, and Lazarus of Bethany in John 11–12.

=== Mary of Bethany ===
(Matthew 26:6–13, Mark 14:3–9, John 12:1–8)

These three accounts all refer to the same woman. John 12 names her as Mary, the sister of Martha and Lazarus. Matthew and Mark don't name her, but describe the same event:

The account in Matthew 26, Mark 14, and John 12 has as its location the city of Bethany. In John's gospel the woman is named as Mary the sister of Martha and Lazarus. Criticism surrounding the action is directed at Mary for using an expensive ointment which could have been sold and the proceeds given to the poor. In the Matthew/Mark/John accounts, Jesus links the anointing with a preparation for his burial as he would be crucified not many days hence.

=== The sinful woman ===
The event in Luke features an unknown sinful woman. A different woman, not named, described as a "sinner" (possibly a prostitute or someone with a bad reputation). It takes place in the northern region, as Luke 7 indicates Jesus was ministering in the northern regions of Nain and Capernaum. The woman uses her tears, as well as perfume. Criticism in this account is directed at Jesus for allowing a sinner to touch him. In Luke, Jesus connects the action with the woman's sins, his forgiveness, and the lack of hospitality of his host.

=== Conflation ===
As with many events in the Gospels, ambiguous or missing details between the authors' accounts lead to different interpretations by readers and scholars. The accounts are generally considered to be independent events, though often been conflated—a result being the assumption that Mary is a prostitute. This is furthered by the presence of a number of women named Mary in the New Testament, leading to Mary of Bethany being interpreted as Mary Magdalene.
The rationale behind two events stems from the details in each account. All four have a setting in a house for a meal, a woman, and expensive perfume poured on Jesus to which someone objects. However, the geographic location is not identified as Bethany in Luke's account. The home in Matthew and Mark is of Simon the Leper, while in Luke it is a house of a Pharisee named Simon. John identifies Mary of Bethany and Luke "a woman in that town who lived a sinful life"—which has usually been taken to mean a prostitute—while Matthew and Mark just say "a woman". The place of anointment also differs, with Mark and Matthew stating that it was over the head, with John and Luke recording an anointing of feet and wiping with hair.
The central message of the stories in Matthew, Mark, and John is very similar with some minor differences such as "The poor you will always have with you" and "She poured perfume on my body beforehand to prepare for my burial". These are not in Luke, who instead records comments on hospitality and forgiveness of sins that are not in the other accounts.

== Debate ==
John and Luke differ from Matthew and Mark by relating that the anointing is to the feet rather than the head. This, some argue, points to the idea that Luke is speaking of an entirely different event. J. K. Elliott explains variations between the four accounts of the same episode as the result of all four evangelists adapting the account to their own "...theological, and dramatic purpose...", using the oral and written traditions to convey their "...own apologetic aims". Ancient biographies could display differences and flexibility when reporting events, with the gospels being in line with the writing practices of antiquity.

Luke's gospel speaks of Jesus' feet being anointed by a woman who had been sinful all her life and who was crying; and when her tears started landing on the feet of Jesus, she wiped his feet with her hair. Unique to Luke's version is the inclusion of the Parable of the Two Debtors in the middle of the event. An argument can be made that this story could not have occurred only a few days before the crucifixion, due to the numerous events that followed in Luke's gospel. John 12:1–8 names her Mary, assumed by the text to be Mary, a sister to Lazarus, as it also identifies her sister Martha. The iconography of the woman's act has traditionally been associated with Mary Magdalene, but there is no biblical text identifying her as such (she is mentioned by name for the first time, immediately following this episode, at the beginning of Luke chapter 8). According to Mark 14:3, the perfume in his account was the purest of spikenard.

The Scholars Version note to Mark 14:3–9 states: "The disciples miss the point, which Jesus makes clear: the woman has signaled his impending death and burial. It must be unintentional irony when Mark has Jesus predict that this story will always be told in memory of a woman whose very name escapes him."

== Gallery ==
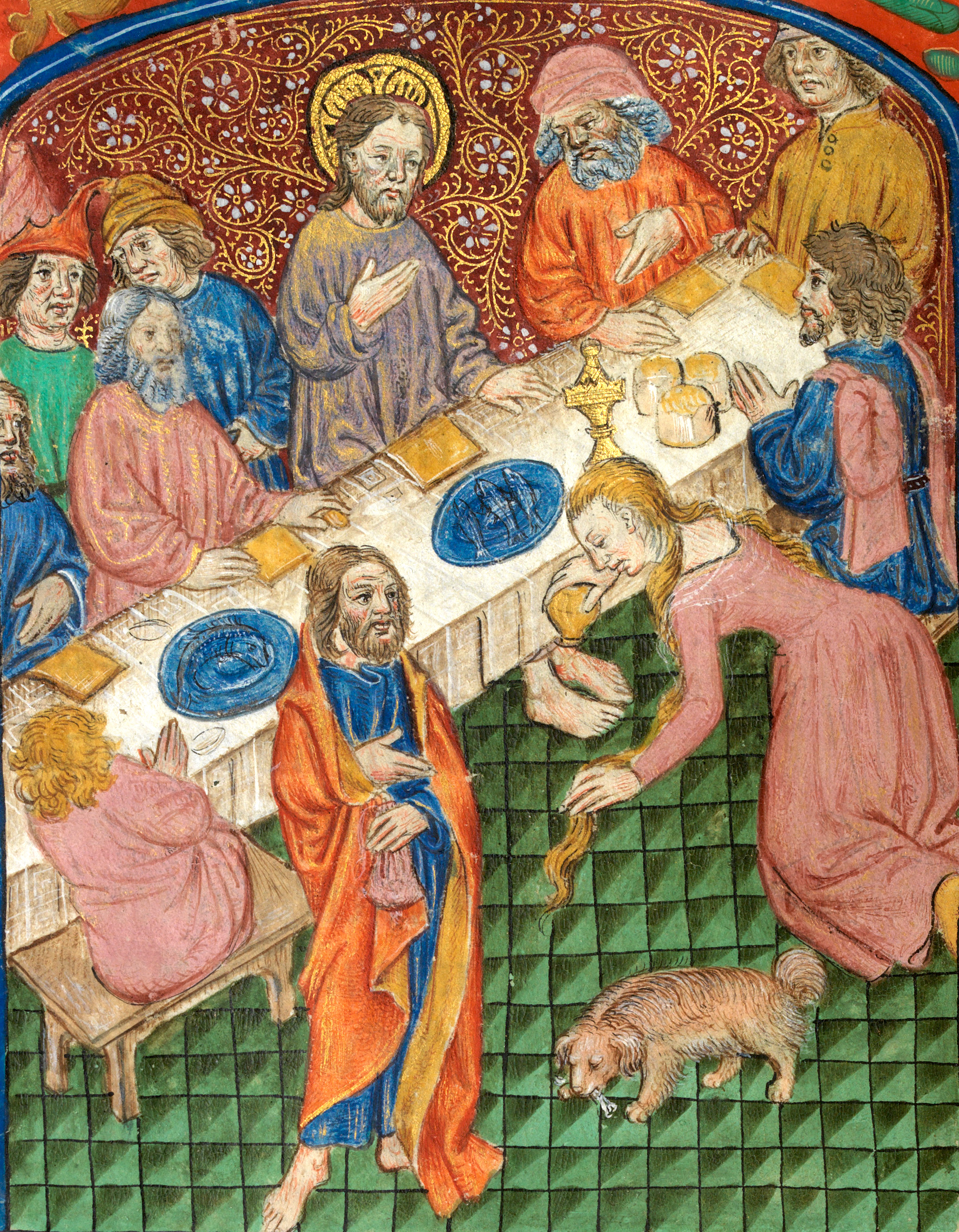
Mary Magdalen anointing Christ's feet. Illuminated manuscript, c. 1500

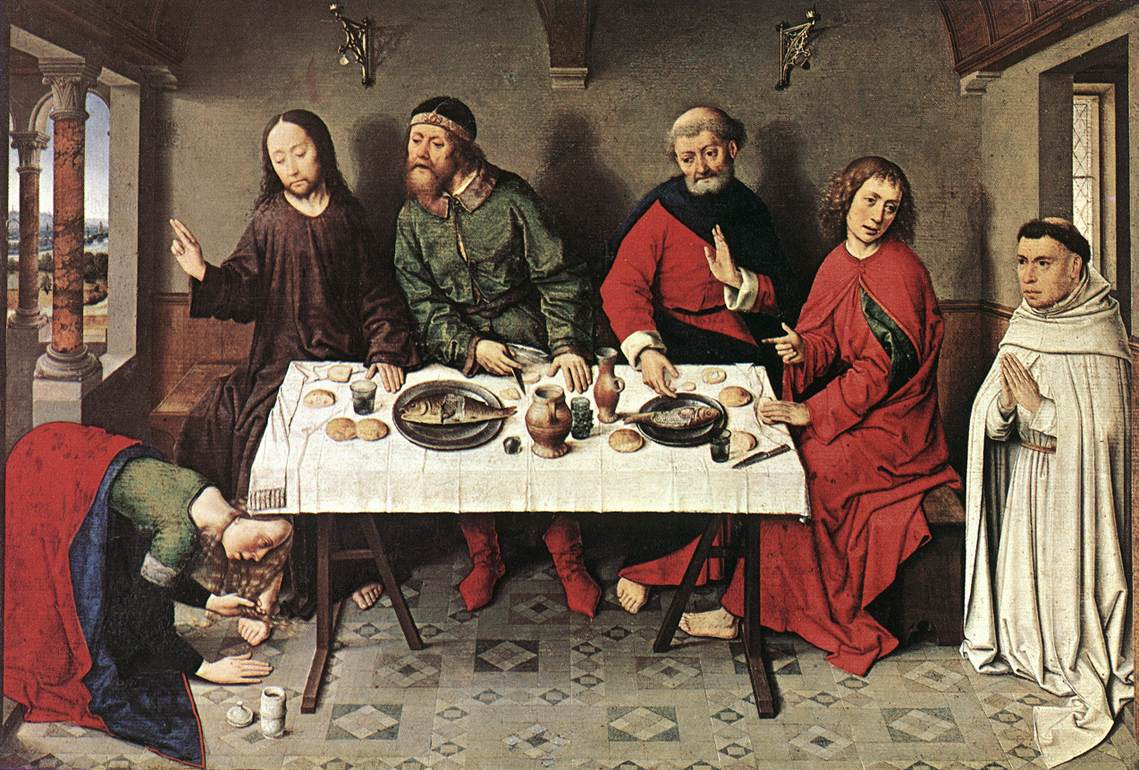
Christ in the House of Simon, by Dieric Bouts, 1440s

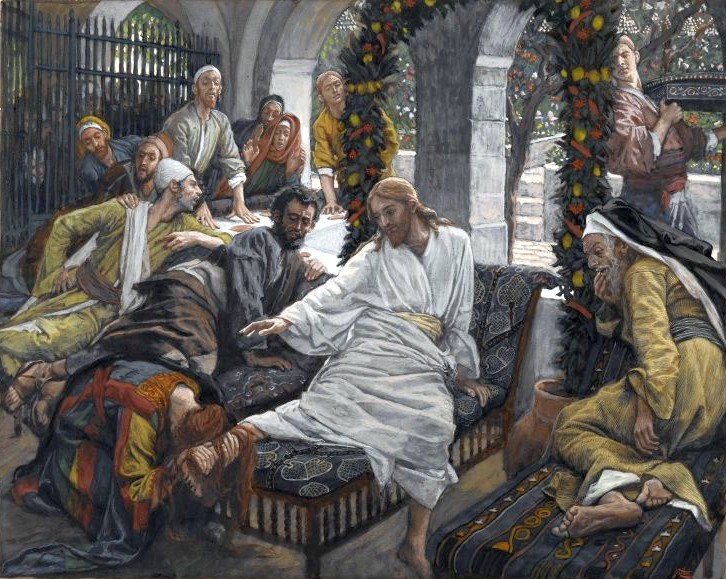
The Ointment of the Magdalene (Le parfum de Madeleine). James Tissot, c. 1900

== See also ==
- Foot washing
- Chrism
- Life of Jesus in the New Testament
