= Naked fugitive =

Unidentified figure mentioned briefly in the Gospel of Mark

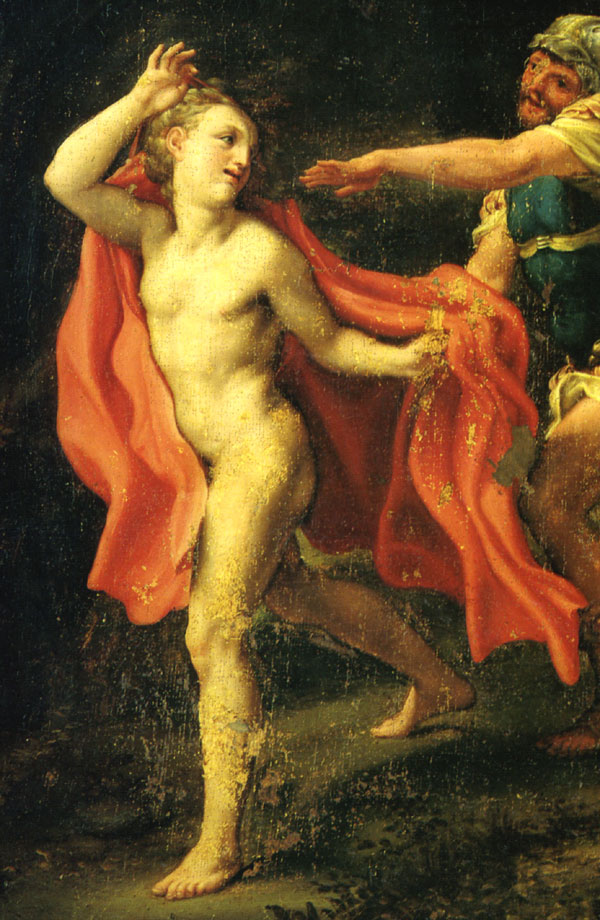
Antonio da Correggio, The Betrayal of Christ, with a soldier in pursuit of Mark the Evangelist, c. 1522

The naked fugitive (or naked runaway or naked youth) is an unidentified figure mentioned briefly in the Gospel of Mark, immediately after the arrest of Jesus in the Garden of Gethsemane and the fleeing of all his disciples:

A certain young man was following him, wearing nothing but a linen cloth. They caught hold of him, but he left the linen cloth and ran off naked.

The parallel accounts in the other canonical Gospels make no mention of this incident.

The wearing of a single cloth (Greek: σινδόνα, sindona) would not have been indecent or extraordinary, and there are many ancient accounts of how easily such garments would come loose, especially with sudden movements.

== Identity ==
Since ancient times, many have speculated on the identity of this young man, proposing:

- James the Just
- The Beloved Disciple
- John Mark
- Lazarus of Bethany
- An antitype of Joseph

A later verse in Mark, "And entering the tomb, they saw a young man sitting on the right side, dressed in a white robe," is often connected to the passage by allegorical readers of (in the words of Howard M. Jackson) the "symbolism school".

The naked fugitive has been speculated to originate in a possible Passion narrative that pre-dates the gospel of Mark. In such an early document, anonymity of the fugitive may have protected this individual from official persecution.

== In literature ==
American writer Lew Wallace incorporated the episode of the naked fugitive into the narrative of his novel Ben-Hur: A Tale of the Christ (1880). In chapter VIII of the eighth book, the novel's main hero is captured amidst Gethsemane events and flees naked. This is purely a literary device as Judah Ben-Hur is a fictional character.

== See also ==
- Mark 14
- Secret Gospel of Mark
