= Luke 7 =

- ← chapter 6 chapter 8 →
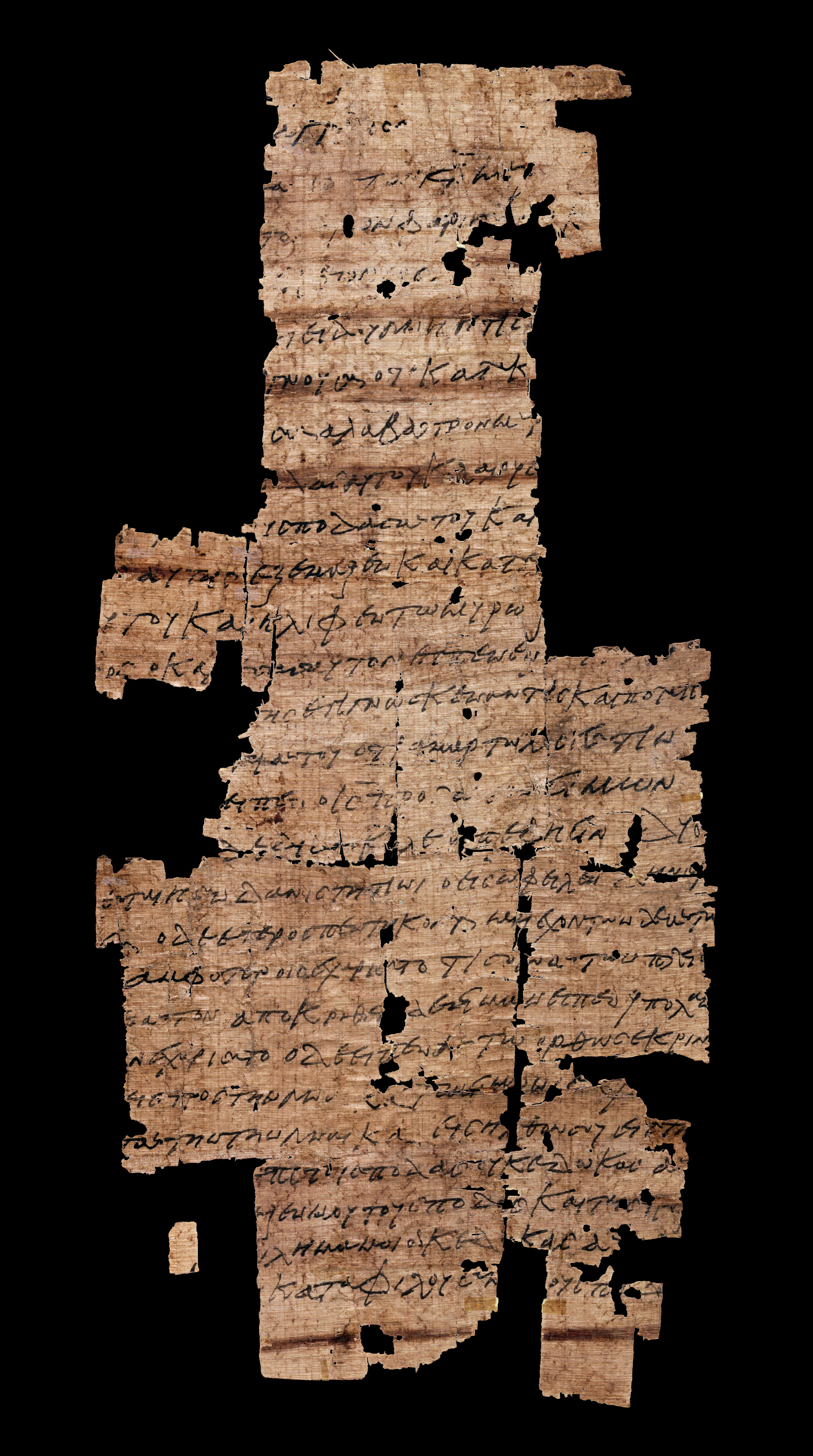
- Luke 7:36,37 on Papyrus 3, written about 6th/7th century
- Book: Gospel of Luke
- Category: Gospel
- Christian Bible part: New Testament
- Order in the Christian part: 3

Luke 7 is the seventh chapter of the Gospel of Luke in the New Testament of the Christian Bible. It tells the records of two great miracles performed by Jesus, his reply to John the Baptist's question, and the anointing by a sinful woman. Early Christian tradition uniformly affirmed that Luke the Evangelist, a companion of Paul the Apostle on his missionary journeys, composed this Gospel as well as the Acts of the Apostles., while critical opinion on the tradition was evenly divided at the end of the 20th century.

== Text ==
The original text was written in Koine Greek. This chapter is divided into 50 verses.

=== Textual witnesses ===
Some early manuscripts containing the text of this chapter are:

- Papyrus 75 (AD 175–225)
- Papyrus 45 (~250)
- Codex Vaticanus (325–350)
- Codex Sinaiticus (330–360)
- Codex Bezae (~400)
- Codex Washingtonianus (~400)
- Codex Ephraemi Rescriptus (~450; lacunae: verse 17 to end)
- Papyrus 2 (~550; extant verses 22–26 and 50 in Coptic language)
- Papyrus 3 (6th/7th century; extant verses 36–45).

== Healing the centurion's servant (verses 1–10) ==
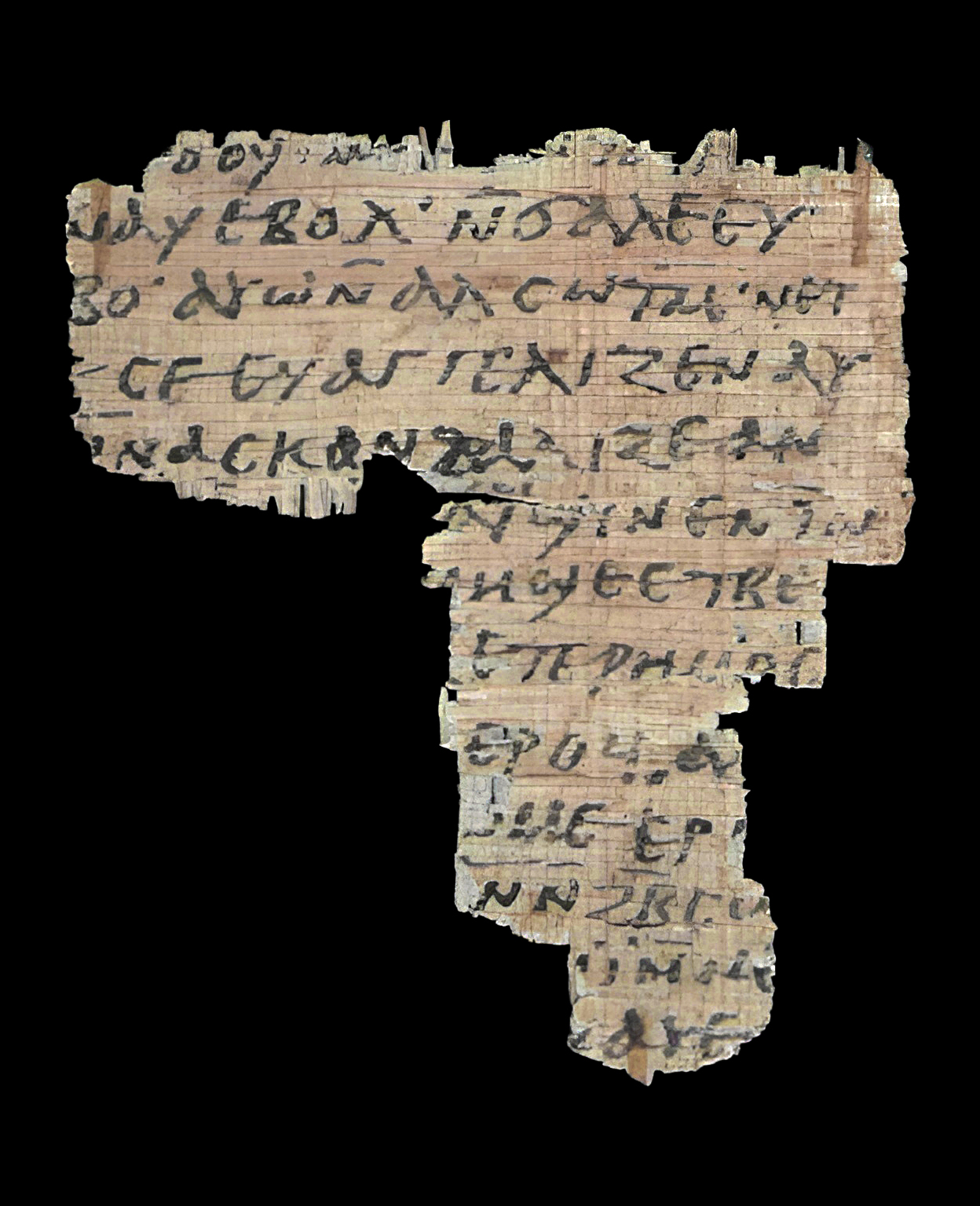
Papyrus 2 fragment containing Luke 7, 22-26, 50 in Coptic 6t/7th century

Luke 7:1–10 relates that, when Jesus had "concluded all his sayings", a Roman centurion in Capernaum sent the Jewish elders to ask Jesus for help, because his servant (or slave) was ill. The elders testified to the centurion's worthiness (ἄξιός, axios) but the centurion did not consider himself worthy (using the same Greek word, ηξιωσα, ēxiōsa) to have Jesus come into his home to perform the healing, sending friends, possibly relatives, to ask that Jesus perform the healing at a distance. Jesus concurred, and the servant was found to have been healed when the centurion's messengers returned home.

Matthew 8:5–13 records the same healing. A similar event is recounted in John 4:46–53, but this may refer to another event as it concerns the son of a court official.

== Widow of Nain's son raised (verses 11–17) ==
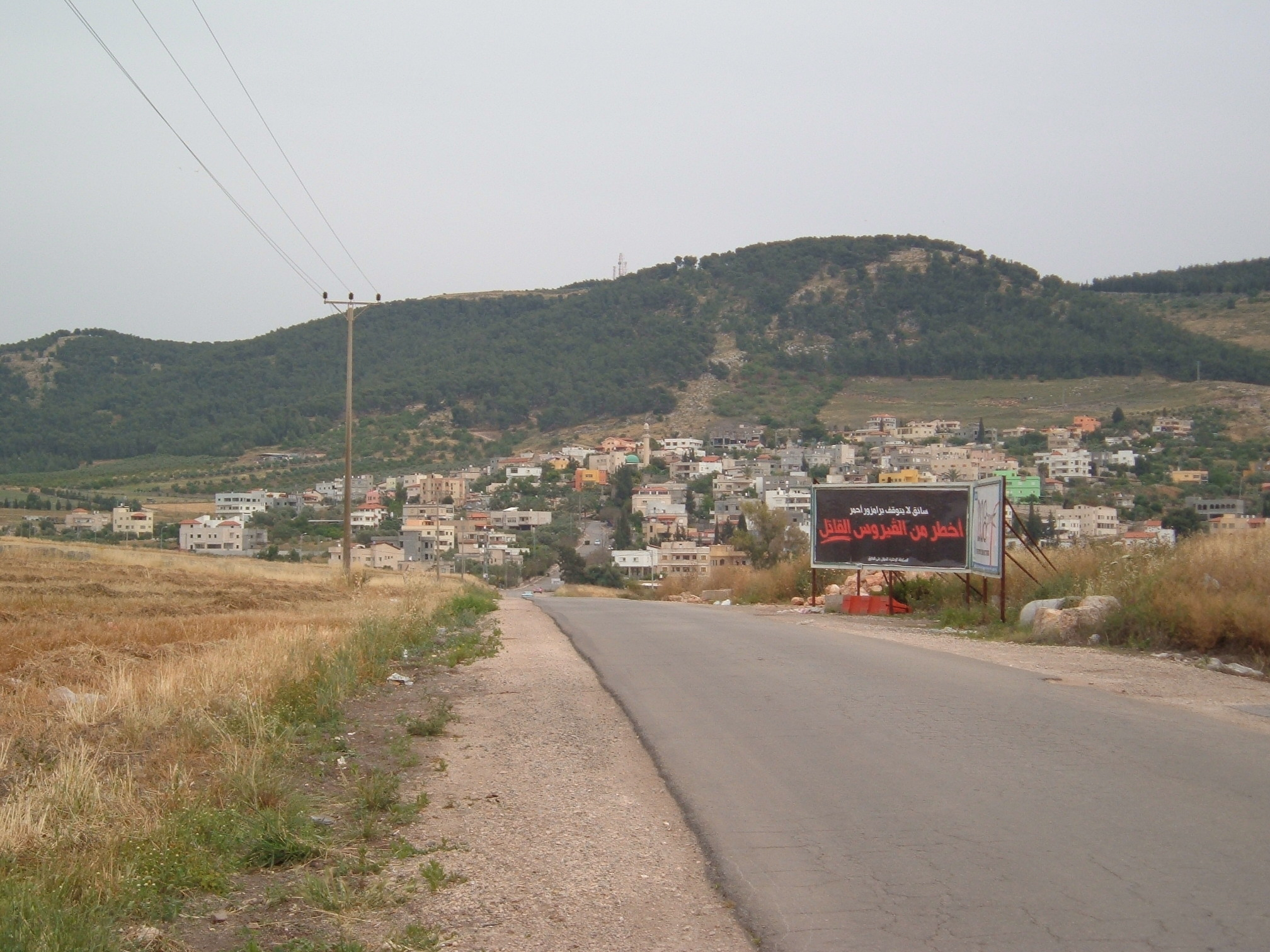
View of Nain (modern: Nein) from entrance to the village (2007)

This account of a miracle by Jesus is only recorded in the Gospel of Luke. Jesus, accompanied by a large crowd (verse 11), arrived at the gates of the village of Nain during the burial ceremony of the son of a widow, and raised the young man from the dead. The location is the village of Nain in Galilee, two miles south of Mount Tabor. This is the first of three miracles of Jesus in the canonical gospels in which he raises the dead, the other two being the raising of Jairus' daughter and of Lazarus.

Following the healing, Jesus' fame spread "throughout all Judea and all the surrounding region". In the Cambridge Bible for Schools and Colleges, commentator F. W. Farrar explains that "the notion that St Luke therefore supposed Nain to be in Judaea is quite groundless. He means that the story of the incident at Nain spread even into Judaea".

Some parallels in details are noted with the raising of the son of the widow of Zarephath, by the Old Testament prophet Elijah (1 Kings 17), especially some verbal parallels. The raising of the son of the woman of Shunem (2 Kings 4) by Elisha is also similar, including the reaction of the people, and in particular, the location of Nain is very close to Shunem (identified with modern Sulam), giving an example of a repeated pattern in the history of redemption.

== Messengers from John the Baptist (verses 18–35) ==
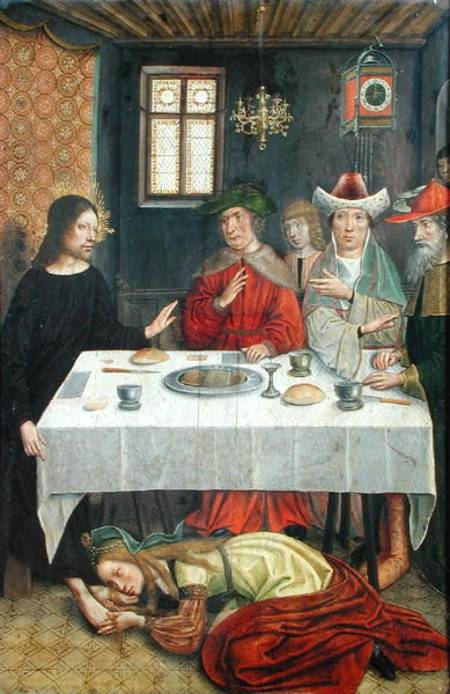
The Meal at the House of Simon the Pharisee, c. 15th century

When John the Baptist was in prison and heard of the works performed by Jesus, John sent two of his disciples as messengers to ask a question of Jesus:

"Are you the one who is to come (ὁ ἐρχόμενος, ho erchomenos), or should we expect someone else?"

Following this episode, Jesus begins to speak to the crowds about John the Baptist, describing him as the 'messenger', a prophet who was himself foretold in prophecy (Malachi 3:1).

== Parable of the Two Debtors (verses 36–50) ==
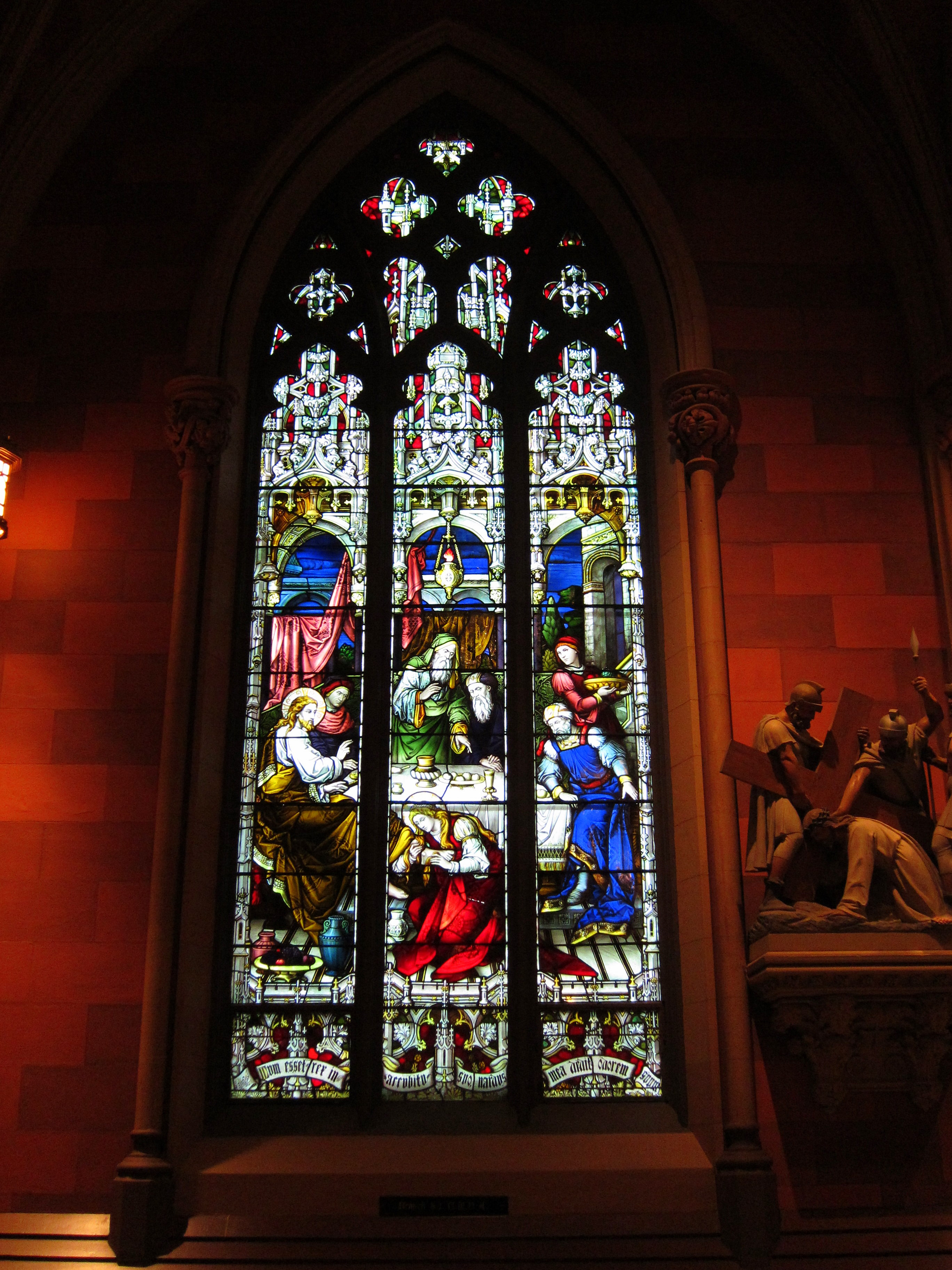
Illustration of "A disciple washes Christ's feet" (Luke 7:38) with the text on the bottom from Song of Solomon 1:12 in Latin (English: "While the king was at his repose, my spikenard sent forth the odour thereof.")

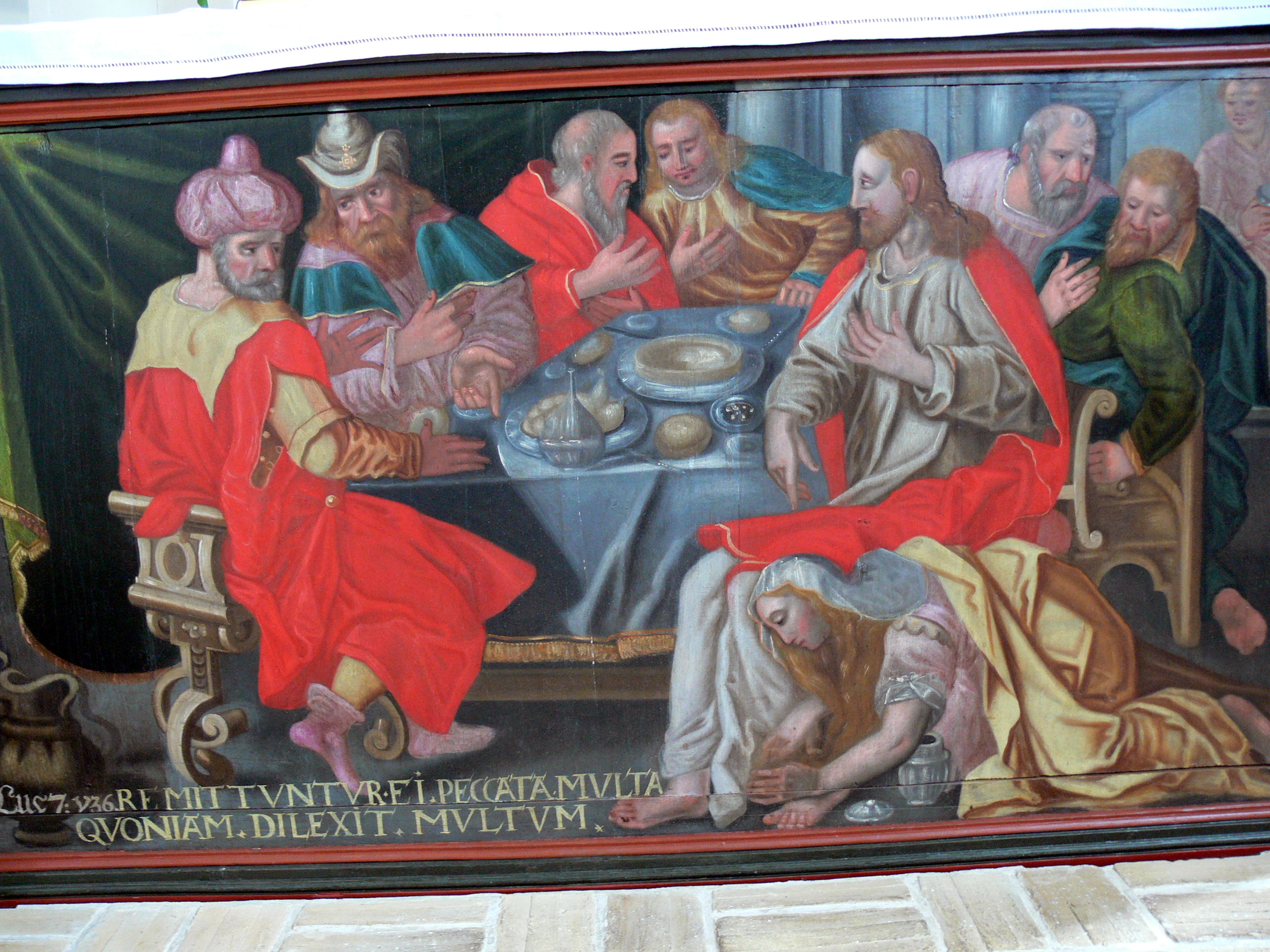
Anointing of Jesus, 17th-century altar painting, Ballum, Denmark

A Pharisee named Simon invites Jesus to eat in his house but fails to show him the usual marks of hospitality offered to visitors—a greeting kiss (v. 45), water to wash his feet (v. 44), or oil for his head (v. 46). A "sinful woman" comes into his house during the meal and anoints Jesus' feet with perfume, wiping them dry with her hair. Simon is inwardly critical of Jesus, who, if he were a prophet, "would know what kind of sinful life she lives".

Jesus then uses the story of two debtors to explain that a woman loves him more than his host, because she has been forgiven of greater sins.

=== Verse 38 ===
And stood at his feet behind him weeping, and began to wash his feet with tears, and did wipe them with the hairs of her head, and kissed his feet, and anointed them with the ointment.

- "Stood at his feet behind him": Jesus, as other guests, 'reclined on couches with their feet turned outwards', a common posture in that period of time also for Persians, Greeks, Romans. This arrangement is called triclinia, by which the guest reposed on his elbow at the table, with his unsandaled feet outstretched on the couch (as each guest left the sandals beside the door on entering).
- "Ointment": or "fragrant oil" in NKJV, is translated from the Greek word μύρον which was applied 'for any kind of sweet-smelling vegetable essence, especially that of the myrtle'.

=== Verses 47–48 ===
"Therefore I tell you, her sins, which are many, are forgiven, for she loved much; but he who is forgiven little, loves little." ^{48} And he said to her, "Your sins are forgiven."

Eric Franklin observes that the woman is demonstrating her love and asks whether this is "because she has already been forgiven, which is what the parable would imply?" Verse 47, "on a first reading at any rate, does not appear to support this, but rather suggests that she has been forgiven because of her love". The Revised Standard Version and the New King James Version can be read in this way. Franklin notes that "more recent translations, assuming a consistency in the story as a whole, take the Greek ὅτι (hoti, translated as "for" in the quoted passage above) to mean, not "because" but "with the result that", for example the Revised English Bible translates, "Her great love proves that her many sins have been forgiven". Verse 48 then proclaims her forgiveness, which this translation assumes has already been pronounced to her.

== See also ==
- Dead Sea Scrolls 4Q521
- Miracles of Jesus
- Nain
- Other related Bible parts: Matthew 8, Matthew 11, John 4

Preceded by Luke 6	Chapters of the Bible; Gospel of Luke	Succeeded by Luke 8
