= Breeden =

Breeden is a surname. Notable people with the surname include:

- Brick Breeden (1904–1977), American college basketball coach and player
- Carl Breeden (1891–1951), British industrialist and cricketer
- C. David Breeden (1938–2006), American sculptor
- Danny Breeden (born 1942), American baseball player
- David Breeden (1946–2005), American clarinetist with the San Francisco Symphony
- Douglas Breeden, American economist
- Edward L. Breeden Jr. (1905–1990), American lawyer and politician
- Elaine Breeden (born 1988), American swimmer
- Hal Breeden (1944–2021), American player
- Rev. Dr. James P. Breeden, American Episcopal Priest and civil rights activist
- Joe Breeden, American baseball coach
- John Breeden (1872–1942), English missionary in India
- Keith Breeden (born 1956), British graphic designer and portraitist
- Leon Breeden (1921–2010), American jazz educator and clarinet player
- Louis Breeden (born 1953), American football player
- M. A. Breeden (1849–1916), American politician and Attorney General of Utah
- Richard C. Breeden (born 1949), chairman of the US Securities and Exchange Commission
- Sarah Breeden, British banker
- Shirley Breeden (born 1955), American politician

== See also ==
- Senator Breeden (disambiguation)
- Clark County School Dist. v. Breeden, one of the opinions delivered by the Supreme Court of the United States in the 2000 term
- Breedon (disambiguation)
