= Breakfast in the Ruins =

1972 book by Michael Moorcock

- Dust-jacket from the first edition.
- Author: Michael Moorcock
- Language: English
- Series: Karl Glogauer
- Genre: Literary fiction
- Publisher: New English Library
- Publication date: 1972
- Publication place: United Kingdom
- Media type: Print (hardback)
- Pages: 172 pp
- ISBN: 0-450-01196-8
- OCLC: 591231
- Dewey Decimal: 823/.9/14
- LC Class: PZ4.M8185 Br PR6063.O59
- Preceded by: Behold the Man

Breakfast in the Ruins: A Novel of Inhumanity is a 1972 novel by Michael Moorcock, which mixes historical and speculative fiction. It was first published in the United Kingdom by the New English Library. The novel centres on Karl Glogauer, who is also the protagonist of Moorcock's Nebula Award winning novella, Behold the Man, his homosexual exploits with an unnamed man from Nigeria, and his fantasies of the past and lives that he could have led.

The novel is divided into nineteen chapters, the first of which is set in the 'present' (1971), the next seventeen spaced out at roughly ten-year intervals from 1871 through to 1990, with the last chapter set once again in the present. The chapters begin and end in the present, with a short scene involving Glogauer and the man, which vary from philosophical discussion to sex involving dominance and submission. The chapters are each also followed, except for chapter nineteen, by a short section entitled What would you do?, which presents sadistic choices, a Morton's Fork, such as:

"You have three children.

- One is eight years old. A girl.
- One is six years old. A girl.
- One is a few months old. A boy.

You are told that you can save any two of them from death, but not all three. You are given five-minutes to choose. Which one would you sacrifice?"

Other dilemmas presented are not that cruel, such as:

- Would you interrupt a pleasant evening out in order to help a stumbling, very messy, completely drunk beggar?
- Would you let your vet put down an old dog which you don't really like but who can live another year or two?
- If your girlfriend becomes pregnant, would you help her get an abortion, suggest that she have the child and offer to help care for it, or abandon her?
- How would you react to a seduction attempt by the mother of your girlfriend, who is quite attractive herself?
- Would you put your old mother into a nursing home or change your life to be able to take care of her?
- If the doctor tells you that your father has only one year to live, would you reveal it to your father?
- If the doctor tells that you yourself have only one year to live, what would you do with that year?

== Plot summary ==
The novel's first chapter begins in London, with Karl Glogauer travelling through Kensington on his way to the Derry and Tom's Roof Gardens. There, on a bench in the Spanish Gardens, he fantasises about the past, trying to put "his mother, his childhood as it actually was, [and] the failure of his ambitions" out of his head with an imagined life in Regency-era London, filled with politics, gambling, women and duelling.

His imaginations are interrupted by a "deep, slightly hesitant, husky" voice and a greeting of "Good afternoon" from a dark-skinned man who spends the entirety of the novel unnamed. He first asks if he may join Glogauer on the bench, and then goes on to explain that he's merely visiting London, and that he hadn't expected to find such a place in the middle of the city. Glogauer wrongly assumes him to be a rich American tourist, annoyed to have been disturbed from his reverie.

The man then asks Glogauer if he may photograph him; Glogauer, now flattered, assents. While he's being photographed, the man explains that he's from Nigeria, attempting to convince the government of England to buy copper at a higher price. Glogauer says that he's an illustrator. The man then invites Glogauer to have tea with him, and Glogauer, feeling guilty, and, despite recalling his mother's words to not have anything to do with people who make you feel guilty, agrees.

After journeying through the Tudor and Woodland gardens, they dine at the restaurant. During the meal, Glogauer attempts to introduce himself. The man, however, does not respond, merely offering Glogauer the sugar bowl. Glogauer realizes that the man is using on him some of the same seduction techniques which Glogauer himself used when seducing girls in the past. When the Nigerian asks Glogauer to "come back with me", Glogauer says "Yes".

The second chapter, introducing a format that is followed by most subsequent chapters, excluding the last, begins, in italics, with a short scene in the man's hotel suite. Glogauer has taken his clothes off, and lies naked on the bed. The man touches first his head, and then his shoulders. Glogauer closes his eyes, blocking reality out, and begins a fantasy, similar to that which was interrupted by the man in the first chapter. The ending of the chapter is also another scene, in italics, that is set in the present.

The bulk of the book takes place during a single night at the hotel suite, during which the two have little sleep. The Nigerian introduces Glogauer to various aspects of homosexual sex. Though completely new to it, Glogauer quickly sheds all inhibitions and starts acting in an (unspecified) provocative manner, startling the Nigerian: "You know how to be offensive, don't you? A short time ago you were just an ordinary London lad. Now you are behaving like the bitchiest little pansy I ever saw" (Ch.15). During the night the two of them quarrel, reconcile, and have some more sex and a little nap. The Nigerian also makes Glogauer paint his skin black.

Gradually, it starts looking like the Nigerian is not what he seems. His English is suddenly changing; suddenly it looks like his eyes are blue; and at a certain moment Glogauer suddenly feels that he might be a woman, or an animal with teeth — and then he looks again like he was. The Nigerian says that "We are many people, there are a lot of different sides to one's personality". Later on, he expresses his objection to abortion because "I'm against the destruction of possibilities. Everything should be allowed to proliferate. The interest lies in seeing which becomes dominant. Which wins". This implies that the Nigerian is aware of Glogauer's experiencing the different lives he might have had — though he never refers to it.

The Nigerian offers to make Glogauer a successful artist and get his paintings bought. Later on, he offers to take Glogauer with him. Glogauer, suddenly realizing that this is a famous man whose photos often appear in the papers, refuses. The Nigerian reacts: "I offered you an empire, and you've chosen a cabbage patch". Finally, they part on roof garden where they first met — and the Nigerian (if he is that) has turned into a white man.

The unnamed Nigerian could be an incarnation of Jerry Cornelius—an urban adventurer and hipster of ambiguous and occasionally polymorphous gender, who appears in several Moorcock books. In Behold the Man, and at the start of Breakfast in the Ruins, Glogauer is white, but by the end of Breakfast he has become black. (Similarly, Moorcock's Jerry Cornelius is white in The Final Programme but black in A Cure for Cancer.)

== Karl Glogauer's variant lives ==
Karl Glogauer goes through no less than 17 incarnations in the course of the book. In each one he is a year older and, in general, more cruel and ruthless. In many of these incarnations, though not all of them, he has a Jewish background.

- 1871: The seven-year-old Karl Glogauer and his Alsatian mother try to flee the government troops' suppression of the Paris Commune, but the mother gets killed though she in fact opposed the Commune.
- 1883: The eight-year-old Karl Glogauer, son of a respectable German family in Brunswick, speaks very indiscreetly to an important guest from Berlin.
- 1892: The nine-year-old Karl Glogauer, a Cape colored working as a punkah wallah at a mansion in Cape Town, has his beloved collection of butterflies accidentally destroyed by a clumsy white man.
- 1898: The ten-year-old Karl Glogauer, son of a rich cigar manufacturer in Havana, sees his brother horribly tortured for joining the anti-Spanish insurgents and decides to join them himself.
- 1905: The eleven-year-old Karl Glogauer, a Jewish refugee from Poland, working with his parents at a sweatshop in Whitechapel, is caught up in the deadly confrontation between Russian revolutionaries and agents of the Czar's Secret Police. Glogauer's parents are terribly maimed but the boy robs a dead revolutionary and gets enough money to take care of them. This is by far the longest and most detailed episode of Glogauer's variant lives.
- 1911: The self-assured twelve-year-old Karl Glogauer, a half-German, half-Indian orphan in Calcutta, builds up a career as a dockside "agent", hustler and drug trafficker, and deals ruthlessly with a sailor who tries to cheat him.
- 1918: The thirteen-year-old Karl Glogauer survives in a Thamn, a French village just behind the WWI front line, by using a dead soldier's gun to hunt dogs, cats, rats and any other creature he encounters and sell the "mixed meat" to a butcher—and then he also kills a human being.
- 1920: The fourteen-year-old Karl Glogauer, a revolutionary fighter travelling on the armed train of the anarchist Nestor Machno during the Russian Revolution, has fun raking the Ukrainian provincial railway station at Pomoshnaya with machine gun fire.
- 1929: The fifteen-year-old Karl Glogauer, son of a rich New York businessman, takes his girlfriend to a speakeasy which is the haunt of gangsters—and meets his father there, in the company of a young woman who is not his mother.
- 1932: The sixteen-year-old Karl Glogauer, originally from Munich, enjoys the life of a rich European in the Shanghai International Settlement. Travelling with his Hungarian mother in the family's chauffeured car, he witnesses Japanese policemen brutally beating up a young Chinese—and does nothing to interfere.
- 1935: The seventeen-year-old Karl Glogauer, a German Jew from Berlin, escapes the Nazis and gets to Italy—only to be conscripted, sent to take part in the Italian invasion of Ethiopia and die of an Ethiopian spear piercing his belly at the Battle of Adwa. At the last moment of dying, his possible incarnations—an opera singer, a great writer and even a great general—"march before him through the dust".
- 1944: The eighteen-year-old amateur violinist Karl Glogauer is sent to Auschwitz and succeeds in getting a "plum job" in the camp orchestra. As long as the Nazi guards like his playing The Blue Danube while they dance with their wives and girlfriends, he can hope to have warm clothes and not get sent to the gas chambers.
- 1947: The nineteen-year-old Karl Glogauer, a member of the Irgun Tsva'i Leumi (National Military Organization), a Jewish underground fighting against the British Mandate of Palestine, takes part in ambushing British soldiers on the road to Tel Aviv, capturing them and hanging them on palm trees at the roadside.
- 1956: The twenty-year-old Karl Glogauer, a Hungarian Jew who survived the war, tries to escape from Budapest to Austria amidst the turmoil of Soviet troops putting down the Hungarian Revolution of 1956—but is shot to death by a Russian soldier on the banks of the Danube.
- 1959: The twenty-one-year-old British Sergeant Karl Gower ("Glogauer" sounded too German and too Jewish) is stationed to the Kenya Emergency and is already an expert in torturing Mau Mau prisoners, his favorite method being to apply burning cigarettes to their genitals.
- 1968: The twenty-two-year-old American soldier Karl Glogauer gets involved in massacring the inhabitants of a Vietnamese village, goes into a mindless killing frenzy and narrowly avoids killing his own officers as well.

Finally:

- 1990 (a future date at the time of writing): The fifty-one-year-old Karl Glogauer will have become a survivor of devastating global wars and one of the handful of humans still living among the ruins of London. He will have become a cannibal, having acquired a taste for human flesh as a mercenary in Paris, and he will have been burning books to keep warm, since reading them will have made him feel too depressed.
- Of the life of the Karl Glogauer who met the Nigerian in 1971, some scattered references tell that he was born about the outbreak of WWII in 1939; that his mother had openly carried out relationships with other men (there was a man in pajamas in his mother's room, at another time he found the air raid warden in his mother's bed); that his father was very patient about it, but finally left and disappeared about the time Glogauer was eight; that he grew up in a rather stormy relationship with his dominant mother, left home at the age of fifteen in order to become a great artist, but was rejected by the Art School; came back home after three months; that he went at some time to Paris and stayed there "for some time"; that at various times he got three girls pregnant and spent 200 pounds to get an abortion for one of them; that he is an unsuccessful painter, frustrated with the way his life has turned; and that he lives at Ladbroke Grove, London.
- To these variant lives of Karl Glogauer should be added the one in Morcock's Behold The Man where Glogauer lives a troubled life in modern London, always obsessed with the character of Jesus Christ. He finally travels back in time, has sex with a nymphomanic Virgin Mary and finds that her son Jesus is a total moron incapable of any of the acts attributed to Jesus. Thereupon, Glogauer decides to play the part himself, re-enact all the acts attributed to Jesus in the New Testament and finally provokes the Romans to crucify him—which they duly do.

== Trivia ==
Some editions of the novel were printed with an introduction that contained a hoax about the death of Michael Moorcock, stating that he had "died of lung cancer, aged 31, last year". It also went on to state that the "whereabouts of Karl Glogauer" were unknown. The introduction was signed to James Colvin, a pseudonym that Moorcock, along with several others, had used on short stories appearing in New Worlds.

In Moorcock's The Bull and the Spear the character Jhary-a-Conel refers to Glogauer as an incarnation of the Eternal Champion. It is thought the unnamed Nigerian could be an incarnation of Jerry Cornelius or another of the companions to the eternal champion.

The fictional Moorcock Multiverse, consisting of several universes, many layered dimensions, spheres, and alternative worlds, is the place where the eternal struggle between Law and Chaos, the two main forces of Moorcock's worlds, takes place. In all these dimensions and worlds, these forces constantly war for supremacy. Since the victory of Law or Chaos would cause the Multiverse either to become permanently static or totally formless, the Cosmic Balance enforces certain limits which the powers of Law and Chaos violate at their peril. Law, Chaos, and the Balance are active, but seemingly non-sentient, forces which empower various champions and representatives.

The Champion Eternal, a Hero who exists in all dimensions, times and worlds, is the one who is chosen by fate to fight for the Cosmic Balance; however, he often does not know of his role, or, even worse, he struggles against it, never to succeed. Since his role is to intervene when either Law or Chaos have gained an excess of power, he is always doomed to be surrounded by strife and destruction, although he may go through long periods of relative quiet. In most depictions by Moorcock all these stories happen in fantasy worlds, but the same would clearly apply to Karl Glogauer's various lives in actual 20th Century situations, as described here.

== Sources ==
- "Moorcock's Miscellany". Archived from the original on 1 November 2007.
