= Breeden (disambiguation) =

Breeden is a surname.

Breeden may also refer to:

- Breeden, South Carolina, United States, an unincorporated community
- Breeden, West Virginia, United States, an unincorporated community
- Breeden Creek, Missouri, United States

== See also ==
- Bredon, Worcestershire, England, a village and civil parish
