= Pansy (disambiguation) =

The pansy is a member of a large group of hybrid plants of the genus Viola cultivated as garden flowers.

Pansy may also refer to:

== Places ==
=== Canada ===
- Pansy, Manitoba, an unincorporated community

=== United States ===
- Pansy, Arkansas, an unincorporated community
- Pansy, Kentucky, an unincorporated community
- Pansy, Missouri, a community and former post office
- Pansy, Ohio, an unincorporated community
- Pansy, Pennsylvania, an unincorporated community
- Pansy, West Virginia, an unincorporated community

== People ==
- Pansy (given name)
- Isabella Macdonald Alden (1841–1930), an American author who used the pseudonym "Pansy"

== Flora and fauna ==
- Junonia, a genus of nymphalid butterflies commonly known as pansies
- Sea pansy, a marine organism formed of a collection of polyps
- Several other species of the section Melanium of genus Viola

== Ships ==
- HMS Pansy, a 1916 Royal Navy Arabis-class sloop
- USS Pansy, an 1861 steamer acquired by the Union Navy from the Union Army during the American Civil War

== Other uses ==
- Pansy (Fabergé egg)
- Pansy Parkinson, a minor character in the Harry Potter fiction series
- a pejorative term for a gay man
  - Pansy Craze, an LGBTQ cultural phenomenon in the United States from the late 1920s to the mid-1930s
- the name of the locomotive on the Richmond–Kurrajong railway line
- Frank Iero's Les Paul guitar
- Pansies, a 1929 book of poetry by D. H. Lawrence
