= P121 =

P121 may refer to:

- Brazilian corvette Apa
- Papyrus 121, a biblical manuscript
- Saunders-Roe P.121 Hydroski, a British naval fighter design study
- TCG Bafra (P-121), a patrol boat of the Turkish Navy
- P121, a state regional road in Latvia
