= Albany High School (Georgia) =

Public high school in Georgia, United States

Coordinates: 31.583°N 84.168°W

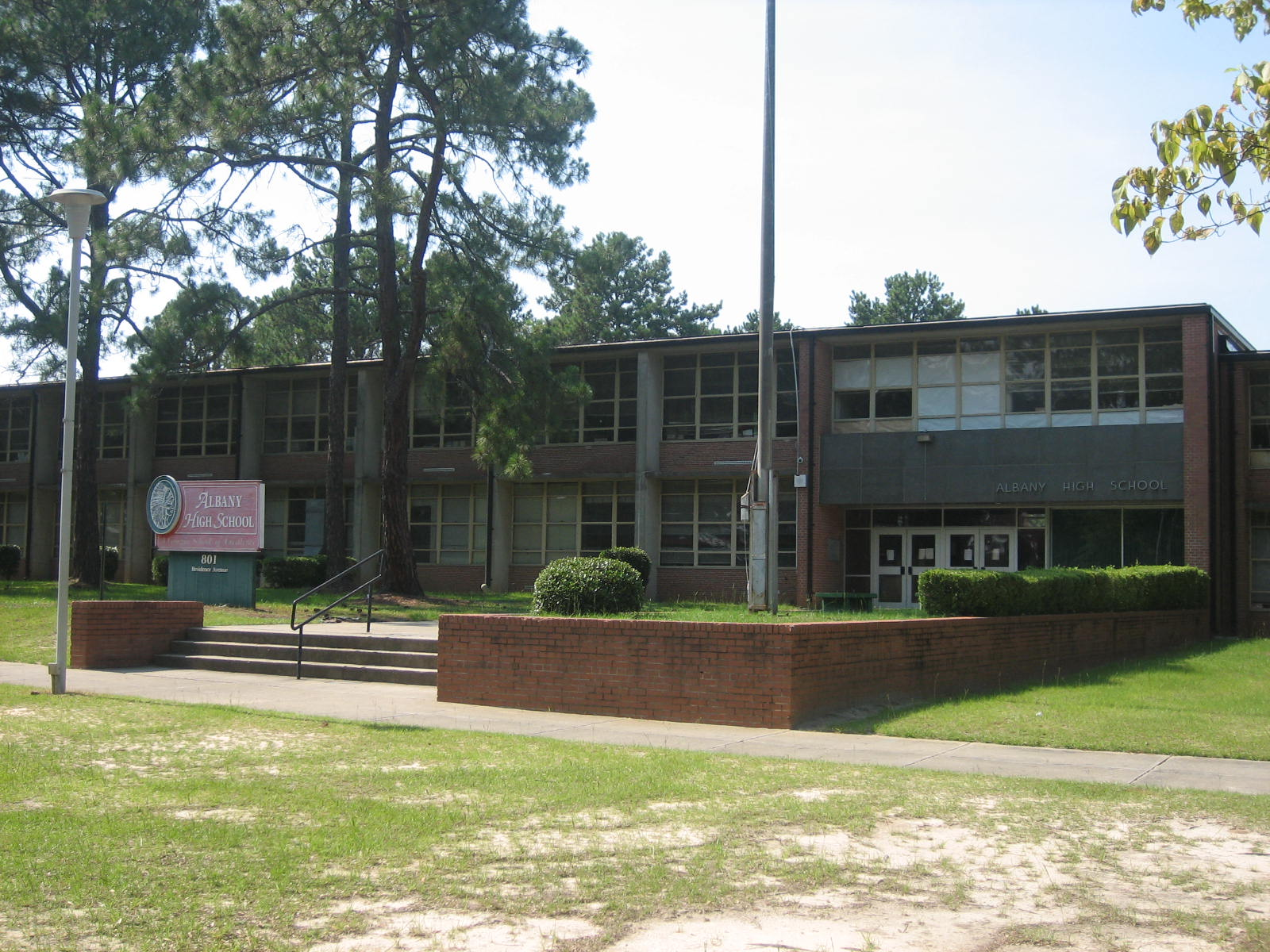
- The front entrance of Albany High as seen from Residence Avenue, prior to renovations

Location
- 801 W Residence Ave; Albany, Georgia; United States

Information
- Type: Public secondary
- Motto: "You just can't hide that Indian pride"
- Established: 1886
- Closed: 2017
- Oversight: Dougherty County School System
- Grades: 9–12
- Enrollment: 878 (2016-2017)
- Campus: Suburban
- Colors: Orange and green
- Mascot: Indians and Squaws
- Yearbook: Thronateeska
- Distinctions: A Georgia School of Excellence
- Website: web.archive.org/web/20150713041240/http://docoschools.org/schools/albanyhigh.htm

Albany High School was a four-year secondary school located in Albany, Georgia, United States. It was a part of the Dougherty County School System and educated students in grades 9–12.

Albany High School was established in 1886 after H.M. McIntosh, editor of the Albany News and Advertiser, initiated a campaign to raise the funds necessary to erect the school. It was the first high school in the county.

Two years after the school opened, it was destroyed by a fire of unknown origin. Classes were temporarily held in the town courthouse while the academy was rebuilt.

Student enrollment rapidly increased during the first two decades. Overcrowding led to expansion and a new building was constructed in 1908. Located at the intersection of Monroe Street and Society Avenue, it contained ten classrooms. In 1925, the high school moved to 1000 North Jefferson Street and in the fall of 1954, it relocated to Residence Avenue.

On June 6, 2017, the Dougherty County School System voted to close the school after summer classes finished. Rising seniors were allowed to choose to attend any one of the three remaining high schools.

== Academics ==
In the fall of 1999, a Magnet Honors Program was added to the curriculum.

== School athletics ==
=== Football ===
The school won one State Championship, in 1959.

== School stadium ==
Hugh Mills Stadium was dedicated to Hugh M. Mills, the school's principal from 1923 to 1925. The stadium was located near the school, at 601 North Van Buren Street. It was used by teams from all four public high schools: the Albany Indians (now closed), Dougherty Trojans, Monroe Tornadoes, and Westover Patriots football and track teams. It was also the host of the girls' state track meet for all five GHSA classifications.

Albany High was the only school in the Dougherty County School System to have an on-site football stadium, so all the high schools in Dougherty County used Hugh Mills as a home field. To alleviate confusion during games between schools, signs were posted at each of the entrance gates to designate the home team. If the three schools have home games on the same weekend, games were played on Thursday, Friday, and Saturday nights.

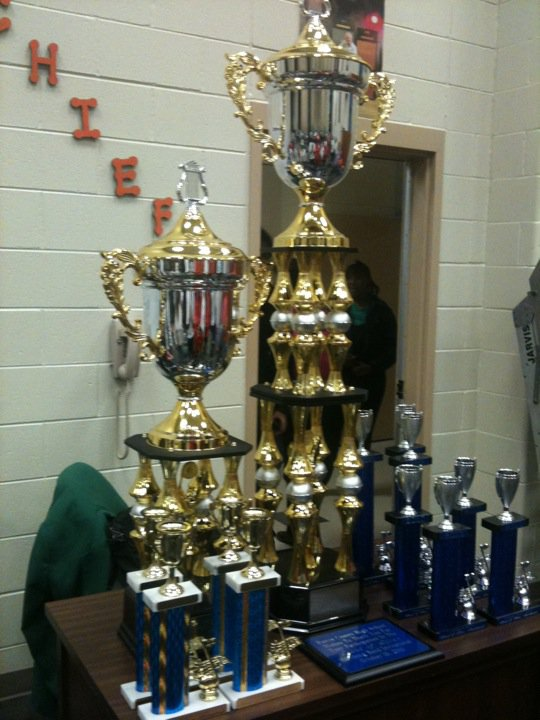
The Marching Chiefs' awards and trophies from winning the Grand Champion at the Sound of Silver Marching Invitational on October 16, 2010

== Notable alumni ==
- Danny Breeden, former professional baseball player (Cincinnati Reds, Chicago Cubs)
- Hal Breeden, former professional baseball player (Chicago Cubs, Montreal Expos)
- Paula Deen, chef and host of the Paula's Home Cooking television show on the Food Network
- Jim Fowler, animal expert and host of the quadruple Emmy Award-winning wildlife television show Mutual of Omaha's Wild Kingdom
- Edward "Skip" Gnehm, United States ambassador to Jordan, Australia and Kuwait; visiting professor at The George Washington University
- Bart Oates, former NFL center and Super Bowl champion with the New York Giants and San Francisco 49ers
- Ray Stevens, country music singer
- Jodie Whire, NFL player
- Alexander Wright, former NFL football player with the Dallas Cowboys, Los Angeles Raiders and St. Louis Rams
- Juwon Young, NFL player
