= Behold the Man =

Behold the Man may refer to:

- Ecce Homo (Latin for "behold the man"), spoken by Pontius Pilate during the presentation of a bound and scourged Jesus shortly before his crucifixion in the Gospel of John.
- Behold the Man (novel), 1969 science fiction novel by Michael Moorcock
- Behold the Man (album), 1981 album by the band Zion
