= Behold the Man (novel) =

1969 novel by Michael Moorcock

- Dust-jacket from the hardback first edition.
- Author: Michael Moorcock
- Cover artist: Gabi Nasemann
- Language: English
- Series: Karl Glogauer
- Genre: Science fiction Existentialism
- Publisher: Allison & Busby
- Publication date: 1969; 57 years ago
- Publication place: United Kingdom
- Media type: Print (hardback & paperback)
- Pages: 144
- Award: Nebula Award for Best Novella (1968)
- ISBN: 0-85031-004-0
- OCLC: 47258
- Dewey Decimal: 823/.9/14
- LC Class: PZ4.M8185 Be PR6063.O59
- Followed by: Breakfast in the Ruins

Behold the Man is an existentialist science fiction novel by British writer Michael Moorcock. It originally appeared as a novella in a 1966 issue of New Worlds magazine; later, Moorcock produced an expanded version that was first published in 1969 by Allison & Busby (one of the first books published by the company). The title derives from John 19, Verse 5, in the New Testament: "Then Jesus came out, wearing the crown of thorns and the purple robe. And Pilate said to them Behold the Man".

In the novel, Moorcock weaves an existentialist tale about Karl Glogauer, a man who travels from the year 1970 in a time machine to 28 AD, where he hopes to meet the historical Jesus of Nazareth. A sequel, Breakfast in the Ruins, was published in 1972.

== Plot summary ==
The story begins with Karl's violent arrival in the Holy Land of AD 28, where his time machine, a womb-like, fluid-filled sphere, cracks open and becomes useless. In numerous interpolated memories and flashbacks, Moorcock tells the parallel story of Karl's troubled past in 20th-century London, to explain why he is willing to risk everything to meet Jesus. Karl has chronic problems with women, homosexual tendencies, an interest in the ideas of Jung, and many neuroses, including a messiah complex.

Karl, badly injured during his journey, crawls halfway out of the time machine, then faints. John the Baptist and a group of Essenes find him there, and take him back to their community, where they care for him for some time. Since the Essenes witnessed his miraculous arrival in the time machine, John decides Karl must be a magus, and asks him to help lead a revolt against the occupying Romans. When he asks Karl to baptise him, however, the latter panics and flees into the desert, where he wanders alone, hallucinating from heat and thirst.

He then makes his way to Nazareth in search of Jesus. When he finds Mary and Joseph, Mary turns out to be little more than a whore, and Joseph, a bitter old man, sneers openly at her claim to have been impregnated by an angel. Worse, their child Jesus is a profoundly intellectually disabled hunchback who incessantly repeats the only word he knows: Jesus, Jesus, Jesus. Karl, however, is so deeply committed to the idea of a real, historical Jesus that, at this point, he himself begins to step into the role, gathering followers - carefully choosing ones whose names are identical with those attested in the Gospels, repeating what parables he can recall, and using psychological tricks to simulate miracles. When there's no food, he shows the people how to pretend to eat to take their minds off their hunger; when he encounters illness caused by hysteria, he cures it. Gradually, it becomes known that his name is Jesus of Nazareth.

In the end, determined to live the story of Jesus to its decidedly bitter end, he orders a puzzled Judas to betray him to the Romans, and dies on the cross. His last, agonised words, however, are not Eloi, eloi, lama sabachthani, but the phonetically similar English "it's a lie ... it's a lie...let me down"

After Karl's death on the cross, the body is stolen by a doctor who believed the body had magical properties, leading to rumours that he did not die. The doctor is disappointed when the body begins to rot as any normal human would.

== References in other Moorcock works ==
Karl Glogauer, in a slightly different incarnation, is the lead character in Moorcock's 1972 novel Breakfast in the Ruins - in the course of which he experiences no less than 17 additional incarnations, at various key moments of 20th-century history. In his series The Dancers at the End of Time, a similar time machine is used, which reveals that if a time traveller dies in the past, he is violently thrust back to the future, thus explaining Glogauer's reappearance. Moorcock refers to this phenomenon as the "Morphail Effect" in The Dancers at the End of Time.

The issue of New Worlds containing the original novella.

== Awards and nominations ==
Behold the Man, in its short form, won the Nebula Award for Best Novella in 1967.

== Selected editions ==
- Allison & Busby, London, UK, hardback, 1969, ISBN 0-85031-004-0
- Mayflower, UK, paperback, 1970, ISBN 0-583-11787-2
- Avon, US, paperback, 1970; reprinted 1972 reprint
- Fontana, UK, paperback, 1980, ISBN 0-00-615344-5
- Grafton, UK, paperback, 1986, ISBN 0-583-11787-2
