= Alexander Wright (American football) =

American football player (born 1967)

No. 81, 89
- Positions: Wide receiver, kick returner

Personal information
- Born: July 19, 1967 (age 59); Albany, Georgia, U.S.
- Listed height: 6 ft 0 in (1.83 m)
- Listed weight: 195 lb (88 kg)

Career information
- High school: Albany
- College: Auburn
- NFL draft: 1990: 2nd round, 26th overall pick

Career history
- Dallas Cowboys (1990–1992); Los Angeles Raiders (1992–1994); St. Louis Rams (1995–1996)

Career NFL statistics
- Receptions: 101
- Receiving yards: 1,597
- Receiving touchdowns: 10
- Return yards: 1,681
- Return touchdowns: 2
- Stats at Pro Football Reference

Alexander Wright (born July 19, 1967) is an American former professional football player who was a wide receiver in the National Football League (NFL) for the Dallas Cowboys, Los Angeles Raiders and St. Louis Rams. He was a two-time winner of the NFL's "Fastest Man" competition. He played college football at Auburn University.

== Early life ==
Wright attended Albany High School, where he focused on track and field until his senior season, when he made the football team. He played at wide receiver and cornerback, where his athletic ability allowed him to cover opposing players one-on-one without any additional support.

== College career ==
He accepted a football scholarship from Auburn University. He was initially a defensive back, but because of his poor tackling and lack of run support abilities, he was moved to wide receiver as a sophomore. As a junior in his first start, he faced the University of Tennessee, tallying 3 receptions for 108 yards, including a 75-yard touchdown. In the season, he registered 12 receptions for 279 yards and 2 touchdowns.

Wright developed slowly on the offensive side of the ball and didn't see much playing time, until becoming a starter as a senior after replacing the graduated Lawyer Tillman. In the season opener against the University of the Pacific, he registered single-game school records with 263 receiving yards (52.6 average) and 4 touchdowns. Against the University of Tennessee, he collected four receptions for 129 yards and one touchdown.

He had an outstanding game against the University of Alabama, recording 7 receptions for 143 yards in a 30–20 victory over unbeaten Alabama, in the season finale and first Iron Bowl to be played at Jordan–Hare Stadium. After finishing the season with 30 receptions (led the team) for 714 yards (led the team) and 6 receiving touchdowns (led the team) in a ground oriented offense, he received the Shug Jordan Award as the team's outstanding senior football player.

Wright finished in the school's all-time top ten career receiving list with 56 receptions for 1,320 yards and 11 touchdowns. He still holds the record with a career average of 23.57 yards per reception. One-out-of-five of his 56 receptions went for touchdown with an average distance of over 57 yards. Of his 11 touchdown receptions, 6 were longer than 50 yards. He also scored in 4 out of the 12 times he ran a reverse run.

He also practiced track and field. In 1988, he won the Southeastern Conference title in both the 55 meters and the 200 meters, becoming only the second athlete in conference history to be named All-American in three events (55 meters, 200 meters and 4 × 100 metres relay). His time of 6.18 seconds in the 55 meters, at the time tied him with Bo Jackson as the sixth fastest sprinter in school history.

== Professional career ==
Pre-draft measurables
Height	Weight	Arm length	Hand span	40-yard dash	10-yard split	20-yard split	Vertical jump
5 ft 11 in (1.80 m)	184 lb (83 kg)	30 1/2 in (0.77 m)	8 1/2 in (0.22 m)	4.42 s	1.53 s	2.64 s	35.5 in (0.90 m)
All values from NFL Combine

=== Dallas Cowboys ===
Wright was selected by the Dallas Cowboys in the second round (26th overall) of the 1990 NFL draft, the first wide receiver to be chosen and the first pick of the round. Although he was considered a raw football player, he was also seen as a gifted athlete with elite speed.

He was intended to become a deep threat wide receiver, to complement running back Emmitt Smith, chosen in the first round of the same draft. As well as Smith, he also had a long (40 days) rookie contract holdout, that forced him to miss most of training camp and the first two preseason games. In the second game against the New York Giants he returned a kickoff for a 90-yard touchdown.

In 1991, he was a starter at wide receiver in the first 8 games, before being passed on the depth chart by rookie Alvin Harper. He displayed his talent on special teams as a kickoff returner, ranking third in the league and second in the NFC. Against the Phoenix Cardinals he had a 71-yard kickoff return. On December 22, 1991, he set the record for the longest play in Cowboys history, with a 102-yard kick off return against the Atlanta Falcons. As of 2018, he and Mel Renfro are the only Cowboys with multiple kick return touchdowns.

Wright was one of the fastest players in the league, winning the NFL's "Fastest Man" competition in 1992 and 1993. In May 1991, he was timed to have run the 40-yard dash in 4.14 seconds. He was also the strongest wide receiver on the team.

He did not develop as well as expected, however, and when later asked about his performance, he admitted "I was never a polished package". At the end of the 1991 season, the Cowboys began looking for trade offers. On October 13, 1992, he was traded to the Los Angeles Raiders in exchange for a fourth-round draft pick (#96-Ron Stone), when he still had no receptions following the first five games of the season.

=== Los Angeles Raiders ===
Wright was acquired to complement Tim Brown and Willie Gault in the team's speed-driven offense. In 1993, he became a full-time starter and had his most productive season, recording 27 receptions for 462 yards. During the final game of that season and with the Raiders trailing the Denver Broncos 23–30, he caught the game-tying touchdown pass from Jeff Hostetler and the Raiders went on to win the game 33–30, while earning a spot in the playoffs.

In 1994, he was sidelined for most of training camp with a calf injury he suffered in the first week of activity, but still managed to keep his starting position. During his time with the Raiders, sportscaster Chris Berman nicknamed him "If Loving You Is Wrong I Don't Want to Be" Wright.

=== St. Louis Rams ===
On March 22, 1995, he was signed as a free agent by the St. Louis Rams. A bulging disk in his lower back forced him to miss the last 8 games of the season. The next year his back problems resurfaced and he was limited to 3 games. He retired after the 1996 season, for health reasons related to his back.

=== Statistics ===
			Receiving					Rushing					Fumbles		
Year	Team	GP	Rec	Yds	Avg	TD	Lng	Att	Yds	Avg	TD	Lng	Tot	OwR	Yds
1990	DAL	15	11	104	9.5	0	20	3	26	8.7	0	14	1	1	0
1991	DAL	16	10	170	17.0	0	53	2	-1	-0.5	0	3	0		
1992	DAL	4	0					0					0		
1992	LAR	10	12	175	14.6	2	41t	0					1	0	0
1993	LAR	15	27	462	17.1	4	68t	0					0		
1994	LAR	16	16	294	18.4	2	76t	0					0	1	0
1995	STL	8	23	368	16.0	2	50	1	17	17.0	0	17	0		
1996	STL	3	2	24	12.0	0	13	0					0		
7 seasons		87	101	1597	15.8	10	76t	6	42	7.0	0	17	2	2	0

== Coaching career ==
In 1999, Wright earned the Master of Arts in sports management from Lindenwood University. In 2002, he served as the interim head coach and general manager of the River City Renegades, a National Indoor Football League team.

In 2003, he served as the wide receiver coach for Francis Howell North High School in St. Charles, Missouri. In 2004, he was the wide receiver coach for West Texas A&M University. In 2005, he was hired to be the offensive coordinator at Greensboro College in Greensboro, North Carolina. He was the offensive coordinator for Southwestern Assemblies of God University in Waxahachie, Texas. He then took a role as the athletic director and head football coach at San Jacinto Christian Academy in Amarillo, Texas, in which he served from 2008 t o 2010. He also assisted with the track team.

Wright later moved to San Antonio for his ministry. He is the current President and CEO for Alexander Wright Ministries in Amarillo. He is also a pastor at Cornerstone Church in San Antonio.
