= Breedon =

The name Breedon can refer to:

- Breedon on the Hill, a village in North West Leicestershire, England
- Breedon Group, an aggregates business in the UK

== See also ==
- Bredon, a village in Worcestershire, England
- Breeden, a surname
