= Pansy (given name) =

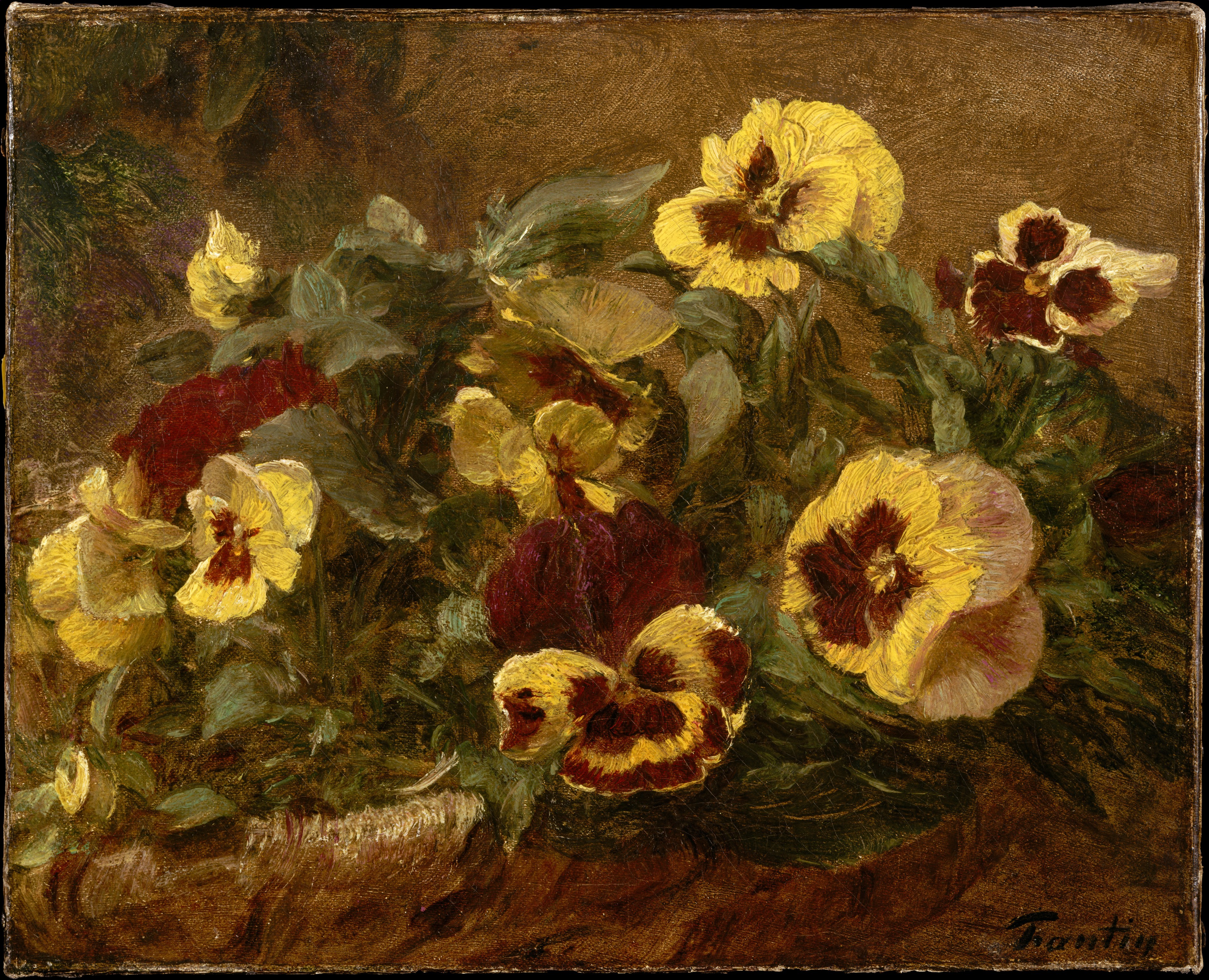
- Pansies by Henri Fantin-Latour, 1903.
- Pronunciation: English: /pænzi/
- Gender: Feminine
- Language: English via Old French

Origin
- Meaning: “Pansy”

Other names
- Variant forms: Pansey, Pansi, Pansey, Panzie, Panzy
- Related names: Orvokki

Pansy is an English feminine given name taken from the name of the flower, which is derived from the Old French pensée, meaning “thought.” It is one of many botanical names that came into fashion in the Anglosphere during the Victorian era. It remained in occasional use through the 1950s but declined in popularity during the second half of the 20th century in the Anglosphere due to use of the word pansy as a pejorative term for an effeminate man. The Pansy Craze was a period of increased LGBT visibility in American popular culture from the late 1920s until the mid-1930s.

== Women ==
- Pansy E. Black, pen name of American stenographer and science fiction and fantasy writer Pansy Ellen Beach (1890–1957)
- Pansy Helen Auld Chapman (1892–1973), New Zealand hospital matron and nursing administrator
- Pansy Chan, Hong Kong squash player
- Pansy Ho (born 1962), Hong Kong billionaire businesswoman
- Flemmie Pansy Kittrell (1904–1980), American nutritionist
- Lady Pansy Lamb (1904–1999), English writer
- Pansy Napangardi (born 1948), Australian artist
- Pansy Stockton (1895–1972), American artist
- Pansy Tlakula (born 1957), South African government official
- Pansy Tsang (born 1966), Hong Kong Cantonese Chinese voice actress

== Fictional characters ==
- Pansy Parkinson, a minor character in the Harry Potter fiction series and film series
- Pansy Bupp of Ottumwa, Iowa, a couturier masquerading as "Madame Zorka" in the Nero Wolfe novel "Over My Dead Body".
