= Jodie Whire =

American football player (1910–1983)

No. 14
- Position: Fullback / linebacker

Personal information
- Born: June 11, 1910; Albany, Georgia, U.S.
- Died: February 9, 1983 (aged 72); Albany, Georgia, U.S.
- Listed height: 6 ft 1 in (1.85 m)
- Listed weight: 185 lb (84 kg)

Career information
- High school: Albany
- College: Jefferson

Career history
- Philadelphia Eagles (1933); Charlotte Bantams (1934)
- Stats at Pro Football Reference

John Joseph "Jodie" Whire (June 11, 1910 – February 9, 1983) was an American professional football fullback who played one season with the Philadelphia Eagles of the National Football League (NFL). He first enrolled at the University of Georgia before transferring to Jefferson University in Texas.

== Early life and college ==
John Joseph Whire was born June 11, 1910, in Albany, Georgia. He attended Albany High School in Albany.

Whire first played college football for the Georgia Bulldogs of the University of Georgia. He was on the Bulldogs' freshman team in 1930 and became a varsity letterman in 1931. In 1932, he transferred to play for the Jefferson Rangers of Jefferson University, which was in Texas.

== Professional career ==
Whire played in two games, starting one, for the Philadelphia Eagles in 1933, recording eight carries for 14 yards, one catch for 15 yards, and one completion on five passing attempts for ten yards and two interceptions.

He appeared in three games, starting one, for the Charlotte Bantams of the American Football League in 1934.

== Personal life ==
Whire served in the United States Navy. He died on February 9, 1983, in Albany.

== See also ==
- 1932 Jefferson Rangers football team
