= John 19 =

- ← chapter 18 chapter 20 →
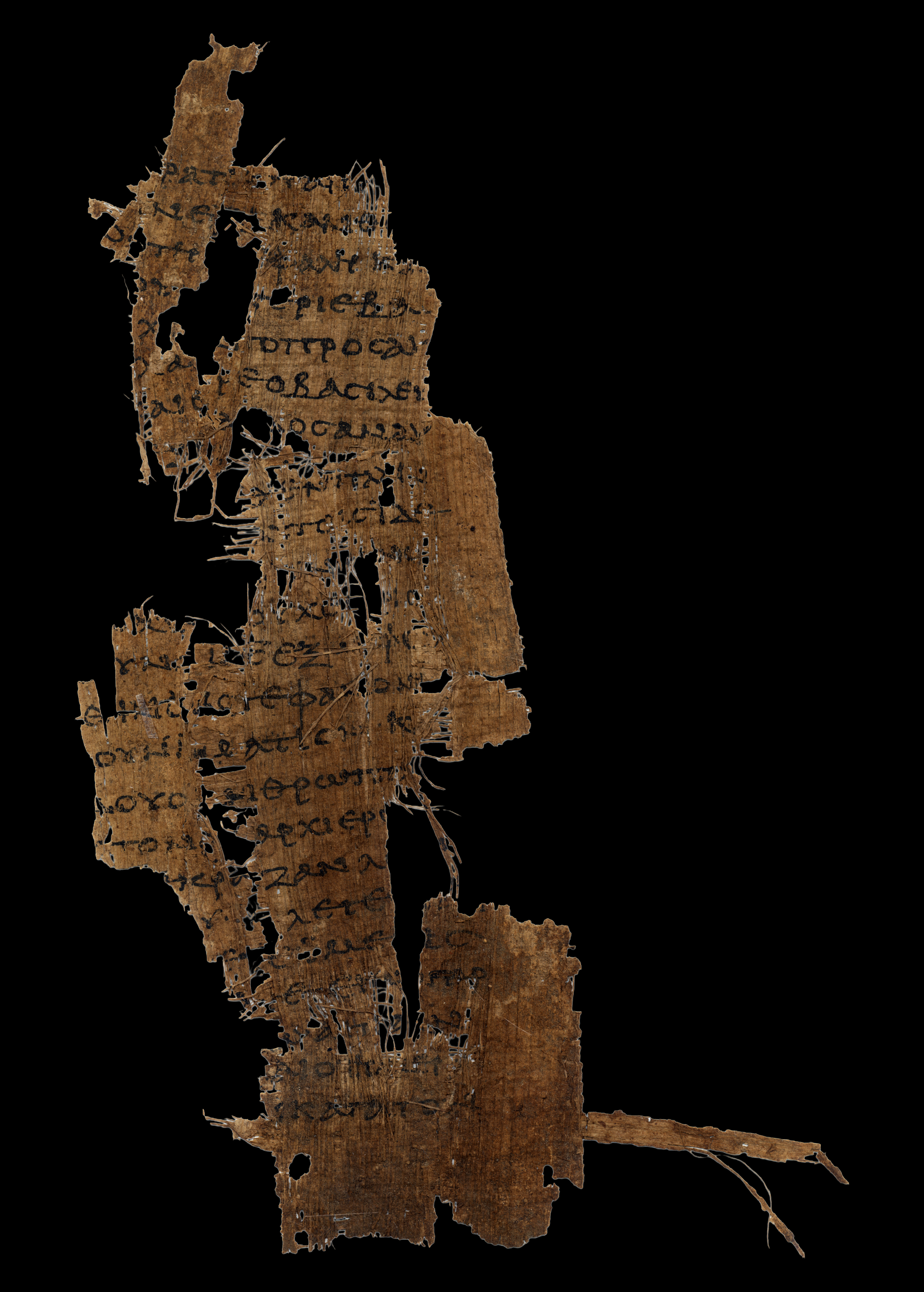
- John 19:1-7 on the verso side of Papyrus 90, written AD 150–175
- Book: Gospel of John
- Category: Gospel
- Christian Bible part: New Testament
- Order in the Christian part: 4

John 19 is the nineteenth chapter of the Gospel of John in the New Testament of the Christian Bible. The gospel identifies an unnamed "disciple whom Jesus loved" as its source and possible author. Early Christian tradition uniformly affirmed that John composed this Gospel. This chapter records the events on the day of the crucifixion of Jesus, until his burial.

== Text ==
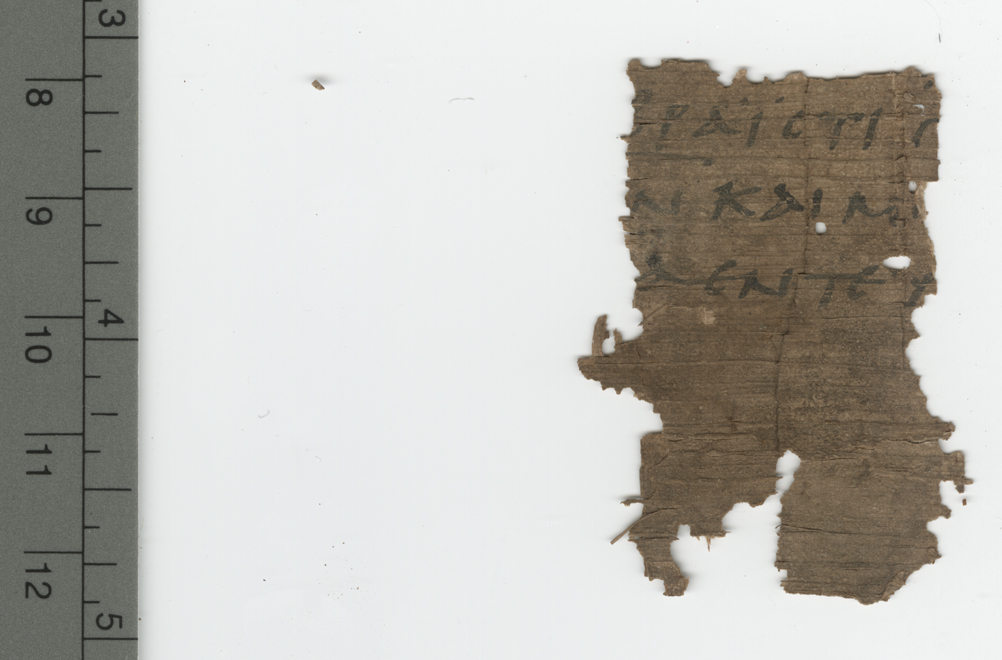
John 19:17-18,25-26 on Papyrus 121 (3rd century)

The original text was written in Koine Greek. This chapter is divided into 42 verses.

=== Textual witnesses ===
Some early manuscripts containing the text of this chapter are:

- Papyrus 90 (AD 150–175; extant verses 1–7)
- Papyrus 66 (c. 200; complete)
- Papyrus 121 (3rd century; extant verses 17–18,25-26)
- Codex Vaticanus (325–350)
- Codex Sinaiticus (330–360)
- Codex Bezae (c. 400)
- Codex Alexandrinus (400–440)
- Papyrus 60 (c. 700; extant verses 1–26)

=== Old Testament references ===
- John 19:24: Psalm 22:18
- John 19:28–29: Psalm 69:21–22
- John 19:36: Exodus 12:46; Numbers 9:12; Psalm 34:20;
- John 19:37: Zechariah 12:10

=== New Testament references ===
- John 18:28–19:16: Matthew 27:1–2,11–26; Mark 15:1–15; Luke 23:1–5,13–25
- John 19:2–3: Matthew 27:27–31; Mark 15:16–20
- John 19:17–24: Matthew 27:32–44; Mark 15:20–32; Luke 23:26,33–43
- John 19:28–30: Matthew 27:45–56; Mark 15:33–41; Luke 23:44–49
- John 19:38–42: Matthew 27:57–61; Mark 15:42–47; Luke 23:50–56

== Places ==
The events recorded in this chapter took place in Jerusalem.

== Structure ==
Swedish-based commentator René Kieffer divides this chapter into two sections:

- Verses 1-16a deal with Jesus' trial before Pilate, and are continuous with the events reported in the latter part of chapter 18
- Verses 16b-42 deal with his crucifixion, death and burial.

He further divides the first section into four parts: verses 1-3 (humiliation before Pilate), verses 4-7 (Pilate coming out of his headquarters with the mocked royal Jesus), verses 8-11 (Jesus' dialogue with Pilate) and verses 12-16a (the "decisive scene" determining Jesus' fate). Kieffer goes on to divide the second section into three parts: a narrative in verses 16b-30 leading to the death of Jesus, a theological commentary in verses 31-37, and a narrative concerning Jesus' burial in verses 38-42.

== Verses 1-3: Jesus' humiliation before Pilate ==
=== Verse 1 ===
So then Pilate took Jesus and scourged [Him].

Heinrich Meyer notes that Pilate "caused the scourging to be carried out", but this would have been done by his soldiers. The action was "inflicted without sentence [or] legality". According to Scottish Free Church minister William Nicoll, the scourging was meant as a compromise by Pilate, undertaken "in the ill-judged hope that this minor punishment might satisfy the Jews". Pilate stated three times (in John 18:39, 19:4 and 19:6) that he found no fault in Jesus.

=== Verse 2 ===
And the soldiers twisted a crown of thorns and put it on His head, and they put on Him a purple robe.

Henry Alford describes the soldiers' action as "mock-reverential", rendered "as to a crowned king: coming probably with obeisances and pretended homage". Meyer also notes that this "contumelious" action of the soldiers was undertaken under Pilate's watch.

=== Verse 3 ===
Then they said, "Hail, King of the Jews!" And they struck Him with their hands.

In the New Century Version, "they came to him many times and said ...". This additional wording reflects the insertion ἤρχοντο πρὸς αὐτὸν (ērchonto pros auton) in many early texts, but which was missing in the Textus Receptus. Karl Lachmann, Constantin von Tischendorf, Meyer and Westcott and Hort all adopt the additional wording.

Cross references: Matthew 27:29, Matthew 27:30; Mark 15:18; John 18:22.

== Verses 4-8: Jesus' delivery to the Jewish religious leaders ==
=== Verse 5 ===
Then Jesus came out, wearing the crown of thorns and the purple robe. And Pilate said to them, "Behold the Man!"

Meyer reflects that the words "Behold the Man" (Ecce homo in Vulgate Latin; in the original Greek: Ἴδε ὁ ἄνθρωπος, or Ide ho anthrōpos) are "short [but] significant". To Alford, these words reflect the "accurate and graphic delineation of an eye-witness".

=== Verse 6 ===
Therefore, when the chief priests and officers saw Him, they cried out, saying, "Crucify Him, crucify Him!" Pilate said to them, "You take Him and crucify Him, for I find no fault in Him".

- "Crucify Him, crucify Him!": The words of the chief priests and officers in the Received Text are Greek: σταύρωσον, σταύρωσον, staurōson, staurōson, meaning "crucify! crucify!", with the word "him" being implied or added in English texts. The Jews did not possess the right of execution, nor was crucifixion a Jewish form of capital punishment.
- "No fault": or no crime (Revised Standard Version).

=== Verse 7 ===
The Jews answered him, "We have a law, and according to our law He ought to die, because He made Himself the Son of God."

The reference to "the Jews" probably means "the Jewish religious leaders, and others under their influence".

Critical texts refer to "the law", κατὰ τὸν νόμον (kata ton nomon), but the Textus Receptus reads "according to our law". Alfred Plummer, in the Cambridge Bible for Schools and Colleges, argues that "our" is not original.

Leviticus 24:16 ("the law") states:

And whoever blasphemes the name of the Lord shall surely be put to death. All the congregation shall certainly stone him, the stranger as well as him who is born in the land. When he blasphemes the name of the Lord, he shall be put to death.

Pilate was bound by Roman precedent to pay respect to the law of subject nationalities.

== Verse 9 ==
[Pilate] went again into the Praetorium, and said to Jesus, "Where are You from?" But Jesus gave him no answer.

A second private examination by Pilate.

== Verse 11 ==
Jesus answered, "You could have no power at all against Me unless it had been given you from above. Therefore the one who delivered Me to you has the greater sin."

In this verse, Jesus tells Pilate that the priest who handed him over bears the greater sin. Historian Paula Fredriksen views it as part of a progressive shift, attested in the Passion narratives and Acts, that transfers responsibility for Jesus's crucifixion from Pilate to Jewish figures and, ultimately, to the entire population of Jerusalem.

== Verse 19 ==
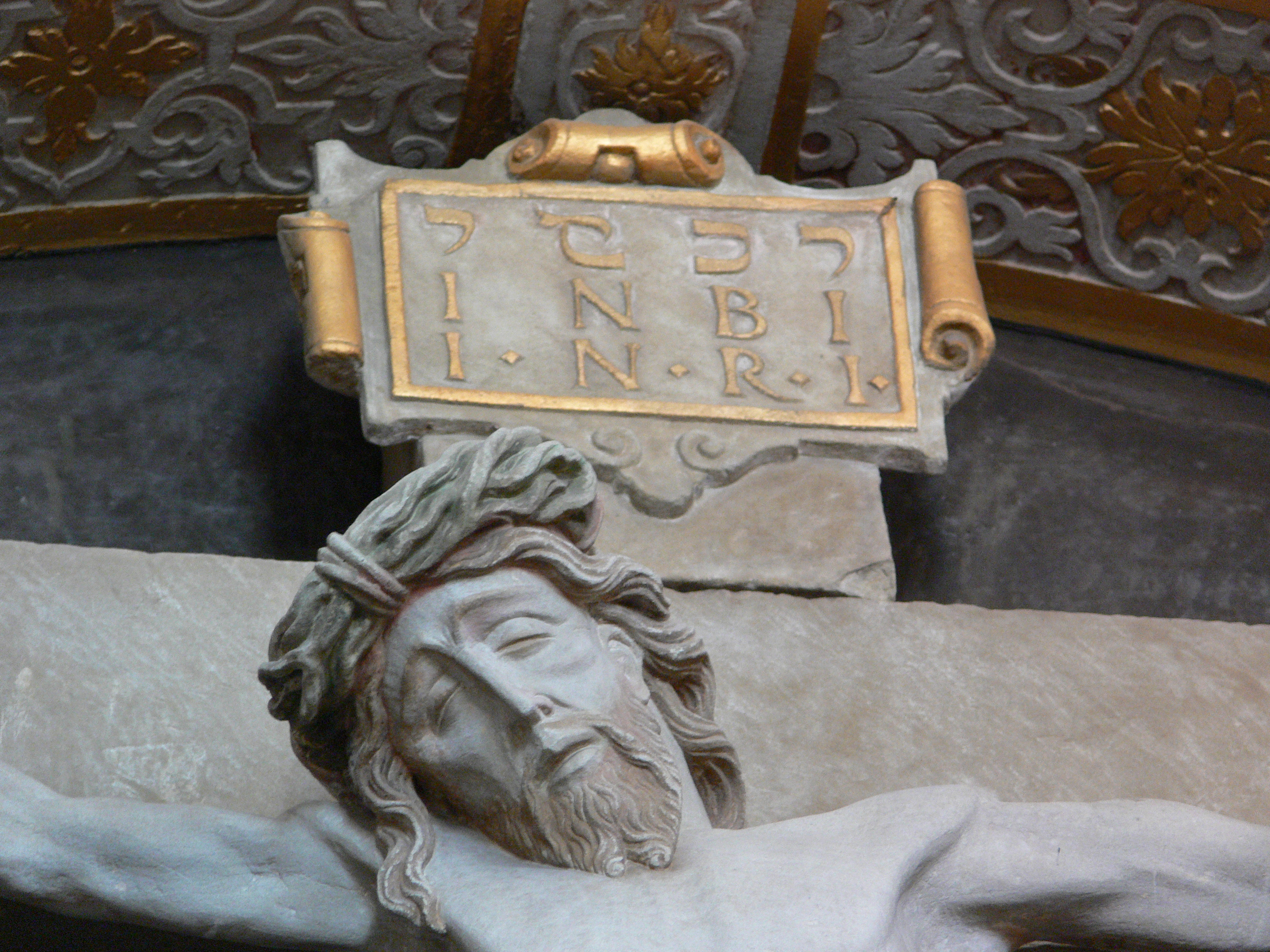
The acronym INRI ("Jesus of Nazareth, King of the Jews" in Latin) written in three languages (as in John 19:20) on the cross, Ellwangen Abbey, Germany.

Now Pilate wrote a title and put it on the cross. And the writing was:

JESUS OF NAZARETH, THE KING OF THE JEWS.

=== Verse 19 in Greek ===
Textus Receptus/Majority Text:

ἔγραψεν δὲ καὶ τίτλον ὁ Πιλάτος, καὶ ἔθηκεν ἐπὶ τοῦ σταυροῦ· ἦν δὲ γεγραμμένον,

Ἰησοῦς ὁ Ναζωραῖος ὁ βασιλεὺς τῶν Ἰουδαίων.

Transliteration:

egrapsen de kai titlon ho Pilatos, kai ethēken epi tou staurou; ēn de gegrammenon,

IĒSOUS O NAZŌRAIOS O BASILEUS TŌN IOUDAIŌN.

=== Verse 19 in Latin ===
Biblia Sacra Vulgata:

scripsit autem et titulum Pilatus et posuit super crucem erat autem scriptum

Iesus Nazarenus rex Iudaeorum

== Verse 20 ==
Then many of the Jews read this title, for the place where Jesus was crucified was near the city; and it was written in Hebrew, Greek, and Latin.

== Verse 21 ==
Therefore the chief priests of the Jews said to Pilate, "Do not write, 'The King of the Jews,' but, 'He said, "I am the King of the Jews."'"

== Verse 22 ==
Pilate answered, "What I have written, I have written."

=== Verse 22 in Greek ===
Textus Receptus/Majority Text:

ἀπεκρίθη ὁ Πιλάτος, Ὃ γέγραφα, γέγραφα

Transliteration:

apekrithē o Pilatos o gegrapha gegrapha

=== Verse 22 in Latin ===
Biblia Sacra Vulgata:

respondit Pilatus quod scripsi scripsi

== Verse 23 ==
Then the soldiers, when they had crucified Jesus, took His garments and made four parts, to each soldier a part, and also the tunic.
Now the tunic was without seam, woven from the top in one piece.

== Verse 24 ==
They said therefore among themselves, "Let us not tear it, but cast lots for it, whose it shall be,"
that the Scripture might be fulfilled which says:

"They divided My garments among them,
And for My clothing they cast lots."

Therefore the soldiers did these things.

The Greek λαγχάνειν (lagchanein) is properly translated not as "to cast lots", but "to obtain by lot". In this action, John sees a fulfilment of Psalm 22:18, the Septuagint version of which is quoted here.

== Verse 25 ==
Now there stood by the cross of Jesus

His mother,
and His mother’s sister, Mary the wife of Clopas, and
Mary Magdalene.

== Verse 26 ==
When Jesus therefore saw His mother, and the disciple whom He loved standing by,
He said to His mother,

"Woman, behold your son!"

== Verse 27 ==
Then He said to the disciple,

"Behold your mother!"

And from that hour that disciple took her to his own home.

"That hour" may indicate that "they did not wait at the cross to see the end and the disciple took her to his own home"; εἰς τὰ ἴδια, see John 1:11, John 16:32. Mary would live with John and his natural mother, Salome, who is also Mary's sister.

== Verse 28 ==
After this, Jesus, knowing that all things were now accomplished, that the Scripture might be fulfilled, said, "I thirst!"

Referring to Psalm 69:21: They also gave me gall for my food, and for my thirst they gave me vinegar to drink.

== Verse 29 ==
Now a vessel full of sour wine was sitting there; and they filled a sponge with sour wine,
put it on hyssop, and put it to His mouth.

- Referring to: Psalm 69:21
- Cross reference: Matthew 27:34; Mark 15:23; Luke 23:36

== Verse 30 ==
So when Jesus had received the sour wine, He said,

"It is finished!"

And bowing His head, He gave up His spirit.

=== Verse 30 in Greek ===
Textus Receptus/Majority Text:

ὅτε οὖν ἔλαβε τὸ ὄξος ὁ Ἰησοῦς, εἶπε,

Τετέλεσται·

καὶ κλίνας τὴν κεφαλήν, παρέδωκε τὸ πνεῦμα.

Transliteration:

ote oun elaben to oxos o Iēsous eipen

tetelestai

kai klinas tēn kephalēn paredōken to pneuma

=== Verse 30 in Latin ===
Biblia Sacra Vulgata:

cum ergo accepisset Iesus acetum dixit

consummatum est

et inclinato capite tradidit spiritum

== Verse 31 ==
Therefore, because it was the Preparation Day, that the bodies should not remain on the cross on the Sabbath (for that Sabbath was a high day), the Jews asked Pilate that their legs might be broken, and that they might be taken away.

Preparation Day was the day before the Passover. Verse 42 refers to this day as "the Jews' Preparation Day". Plummer suggests that "the addition of 'the Jews' may point to the time when there was already a Christian ‘preparation-day'".

== Verse 34 ==
But one of the soldiers pierced His side with a spear, and immediately blood and water came out.

For discussion of the physiological aspects of how water and blood might apparently flow out together from Jesus' body, see Crucifixion of Jesus#Medical aspects. Pope Francis draws together several themes which he says the early Christians would have recognised in this single observation: "one who is pierced" (see Verse 37), an open or flowing fountain, "the outpouring of a spirit of compassion and supplication", and "the water of the Spirit" pouring forth.

== Verse 37 ==
And again another Scripture says, "They shall look on Him whom they pierced".

This is the last of a series of texts, commencing from John 13:18: "that the Scripture may be fulfilled, 'He who eats bread with Me has lifted up his heel against Me', in which the evangelist confirms that the events of the passion fulfill the Old Testament scriptures. The quoted passage is Zechariah 12:10b, "then they will look on Me whom they pierced", with the word "me" changed to "him". Lutheran commentator Johann Bengel argues that John quotes this passage "for the sake of its allusion to the piercing [not for that to the looking]".

== Verse 39 ==
And Nicodemus, who at first came to Jesus by night, also came, bringing a mixture of myrrh and aloes, about a hundred pounds.

Bengel notes that Nicodemus, who had shown his faith in dialogue with Jesus in chapter 3, here "manifested [it] by an altogether distinguished work of love".

== Verse 40 ==
Then took they the body of Jesus, and wound it in linen clothes with the spices, as the manner of the Jews is to bury.

== See also ==
- Burial of Jesus
- Crucifixion of Jesus
- Jerusalem
- Jesus Christ
- "Jesus, King of the Jews"
- Joseph of Arimathea
- Longinus
- Nazareth
- Nicodemus
- Pontius Pilate
- Sabbath
- Stephaton
- Related Bible parts: Exodus 12, Numbers 9, Psalm 22, Psalm 34, Psalm 69, Zechariah 12, Matthew 2, Matthew 27, Mark 15, Luke 23, John 3, John 18

== Bibliography ==
- Kirkpatrick, A. F. (1901). The Book of Psalms: with Introduction and Notes. The Cambridge Bible for Schools and Colleges. Vol. Book IV and V: Psalms XC-CL. Cambridge: At the University Press.

Preceded by John 18	Chapters of the Bible; Gospel of John	Succeeded by John 20
