= Juwon Young =

American football player (born 1998)

Profile
- Position: Linebacker

Personal information
- Born: June 4, 1995 (age 31); Albany, Georgia, U.S.
- Listed height: 6 ft 2 in (1.88 m)
- Listed weight: 243 lb (110 kg)

Career information
- High school: Albany
- College: Marshall
- NFL draft: 2019: undrafted

Career history
- Detroit Lions (2019)*; Seattle Seahawks (2019)*
- * Offseason or practice squad member only

Juwon Quantavious Young (born June 4, 1995) is an American former professional football linebacker. He played college football at Miami and Marshall.

== Professional career ==
Pre-draft measurables
| Height | Weight | Arm length | Hand span | 40-yard dash | 10-yard split | 20-yard split | 20-yard shuttle | Three-cone drill | Vertical jump | Broad jump | Bench press |
|---|---|---|---|---|---|---|---|---|---|---|---|
| 6 ft 2 in (1.88 m) | 243 lb (110 kg) | 33 1/8 in (0.84 m) | 10 1/8 in (0.26 m) | 4.76 s | 1.70 s | 2.70 s | 4.40 s | 7.33 s | 30 1/2 in (0.77 m) | 9 ft 11 in (3.02 m) | 27 reps |
All values from Marshall University's Pro Day.

=== Detroit Lions ===
After going undrafted in the 2019 NFL draft, Young was signed by the Detroit Lions as an undrafted free agent on May 13, 2019. He was waived on June 3, 2019.

=== Seattle Seahawks ===
On August 10, 2019, Young was signed by the Seattle Seahawks. He was waived on August 31, 2019.
