= Jesus, King of the Jews =

Title of Jesus referred to in the New Testament

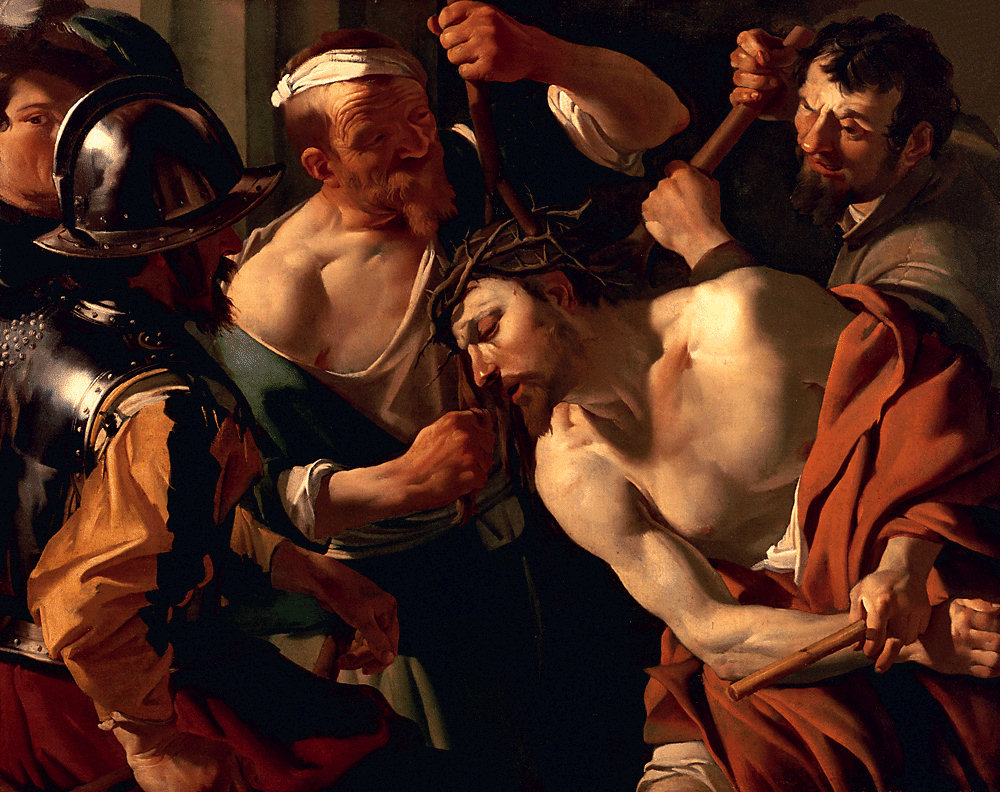
Jesus, crowned with thorns in a Tyrian purple robe as the King of the Jews, being mocked and beaten during his Passion, depicted by van Baburen, 1623

King of the Jews is a title used for Jesus in the New Testament, both at the beginning of his life and at the end. In the Koine Greek of the New Testament, e.g., in John 19:3, this is written as Basileus ton Ioudaion (βασιλεὺς τῶν Ἰουδαίων).

Both uses of the title lead to dramatic results in the New Testament accounts. In the account of the nativity of Jesus in the Gospel of Matthew, the Biblical Magi who come from the east call Jesus the "King of the Jews", implying that he was the Messiah. This caused Herod the Great to order the Massacre of the Innocents. Towards the end of the accounts of all four canonical Gospels, in the narrative of the Passion of Jesus, the title "King of the Jews" leads to charges against Jesus that result in his crucifixion.

The Latin inscription (in John 19:19 and Matthew 27:37) Iesus Nazarenus, Rex Iudaeorum (INRI) translates to "Jesus the Nazarene, King of the Jews", and John 19:20 states that this was written in three languages—Hebrew, (Note: Some translations render Ἑβραϊστί (Hebraisti), the Koine Hellenic word used in John 19:20, as "Aramaic" rather than "Hebrew". (Aramaic, which was closely related to Hebrew, had become a common vernacular of the Jews by this period. Hebrew was in decline, but would continue to be spoken in the region until the beginning of the 3rd century CE.) However, Ἑβραϊστί is consistently used in Koine Hellenic at this time to mean Hebrew and Συριστί (Syristi) is used to mean Aramaic. Other than the word itself, there is no direct evidence in the verse as to whether Hebrew or Aramaic is meant and translations of the verse which render Ἑβραϊστί as Aramaic are reliant on assumptions made outside of the text to justify it, rather than the text itself.) Latin, and Greek (ΙΝΒΙ = Ἰησοῦς Ναζωραῖος Βασιλεὺς Ἰουδαίων)—during the crucifixion of Jesus.

The title "King of the Jews" is only used in the New Testament by gentiles, namely by the Magi, Pontius Pilate, and the Roman soldiers. In contrast, the Jewish followers of Jesus use the title "King of Israel" or the Hebrew word Messiah, which can also imply kingship of the Jews.

Although the phrase "King of the Jews" is used in most English translations, (Note: See range of translations assembled at BibleGateway.com) it has also been translated "King of the Judeans" (see Ioudaioi).

== In the nativity ==
In the account of the nativity of Jesus in the Gospel of Matthew, the Biblical Magi go to King Herod in Jerusalem and (in Matthew 2:2) ask him: "Where is he that is born King of the Jews?" Herod asks the "chief priests and teachers of the law", who tell him in Bethlehem of Judea.

The question troubles Herod who considers the title his own, and in Matthew 2:7–8 he questions the Magi about the exact time of the Star of Bethlehem's appearance. Herod sends the Magi to Bethlehem, telling them to notify him when they find the child. After the Magi find Jesus and present their gifts, having been warned in a dream not to return to Herod, they returned to their country by a different way.

An angel appears to Joseph in a dream and warns him to take Jesus and Mary into Egypt (Matthew 2:13). When Herod realizes he has been outwitted by the Magi he gives orders to kill all the boys in Bethlehem and its vicinity who are two years old and under. (Matthew 2:16)

== In the Passion narratives ==
In the accounts of the Passion of Jesus, the title King of the Jews is used on three occasions. In the first such episode, all four Gospels state that the title was used for Jesus when he was interviewed by Pilate and that his crucifixion was based on that charge, as in Matthew 27:11, Mark 15:2, Luke 23:3 and John 18:33.

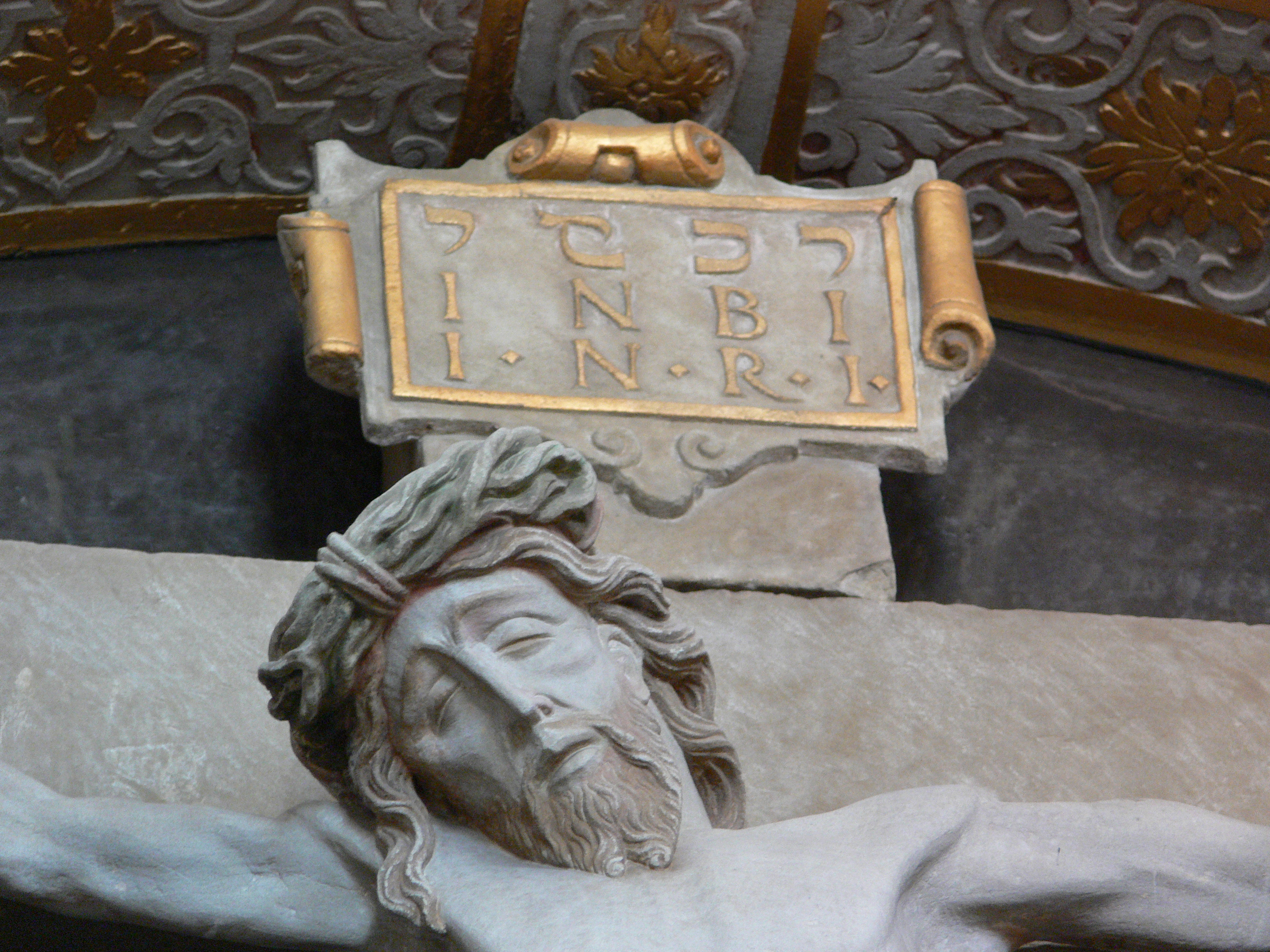
Acronyms for "Jesus of Nazareth, King of the Jews" written in three languages (as in John 19:20) on the cross, Ellwangen Abbey, Germany

The use of the terms king and kingdom and the role of the Jews in using the term king to accuse Jesus are central to the discussion between Jesus and Pilate. In Matthew 27:11, Mark 15:2, and Luke 23:3 Jesus responds to Pilate, "you have said so" when asked if Jesus is the King of the Jews and says nothing further. This answer is traditionally interpreted as an affirmative. Some scholars describe it as ambiguous and enigmatic. Other scholars say it was calculated not to anger Pilate while allowing the gospel reader to understand that the answer is affirmative. In John 18:34, he hints that the king accusation did not originate with Pilate but with "others" and, in John 18:36, he states: "My kingdom is not of this world". However, Jesus does not directly deny being the King of the Jews.

In the New Testament, Pilate writes "Jesus the Nazarene, King of the Jews" as a sign to be affixed to the cross of Jesus. John 19:21 states that the Jews told Pilate: "Do not write King of the Jews" but instead write that Jesus had merely claimed that title, but Pilate wrote it anyway. Pilate's response to the protest is recorded by John: "What I have written, I have written."

After the trial by Pilate and after the flagellation of Christ episode, the soldiers mock Jesus as the King of Jews by putting a purple robe (that signifies royal status) on him, place a Crown of Thorns on his head, and beat and mistreat him in Matthew 27:29–30, Mark 15:17–19 and John 19:2–3.

The continued reliance on the use of the term king by the Judeans to press charges against Jesus is a key element of the final decision to crucify him. In John 19:12 Pilate seeks to release Jesus, but the Jews object, saying: "If thou release this man, thou art not Caesar's friend: every one that maketh himself a king speaketh against Caesar", bringing the power of Caesar to the forefront of the discussion. In John 19:12, the Jews then cry out: "Crucify him! ... We have no king but Caesar."

The use of the term "King of the Jews" by the early Church after the death of Jesus was thus not without risk, for this term could have opened them to prosecution as followers of Jesus, who was accused of possible rebellion against Rome.

The final use of the title only appears in Luke 23:36–37. Here, after Jesus has carried the cross to Calvary and has been nailed to the cross, the soldiers look up on him on the cross, mock him, offer him vinegar and say: "If thou art the King of the Jews, save thyself." In the parallel account in Matthew 27:42, the Jewish priests mock Jesus as "King of Israel", saying: "He is the King of Israel; let him now come down from the cross, and we will believe in him."

== King of the Jews vs King of Israel ==
In the New Testament, the "King of the Jews" title is used only by the gentiles, by the Magi, Pontius Pilate, and Roman soldiers. In contrast, the Jews in the New Testament prefer the designation "King of Israel" as used reverentially by Jesus' Jewish followers in John 1:49 and John 12:13, and mockingly by the Jewish leaders in Matthew 27:42 and Mark 15:32. From Pilate's perspective, it is the term "King" (regardless of Jews or Israel) that is sensitive, for it implies possible rebellion against the Roman Empire.

In the Gospel of Mark the distinction between King of the Jews and King of Israel is made consciously, setting apart the two uses of the term by the Jews and the gentiles.

== INRI and ΙΝΒΙ ==
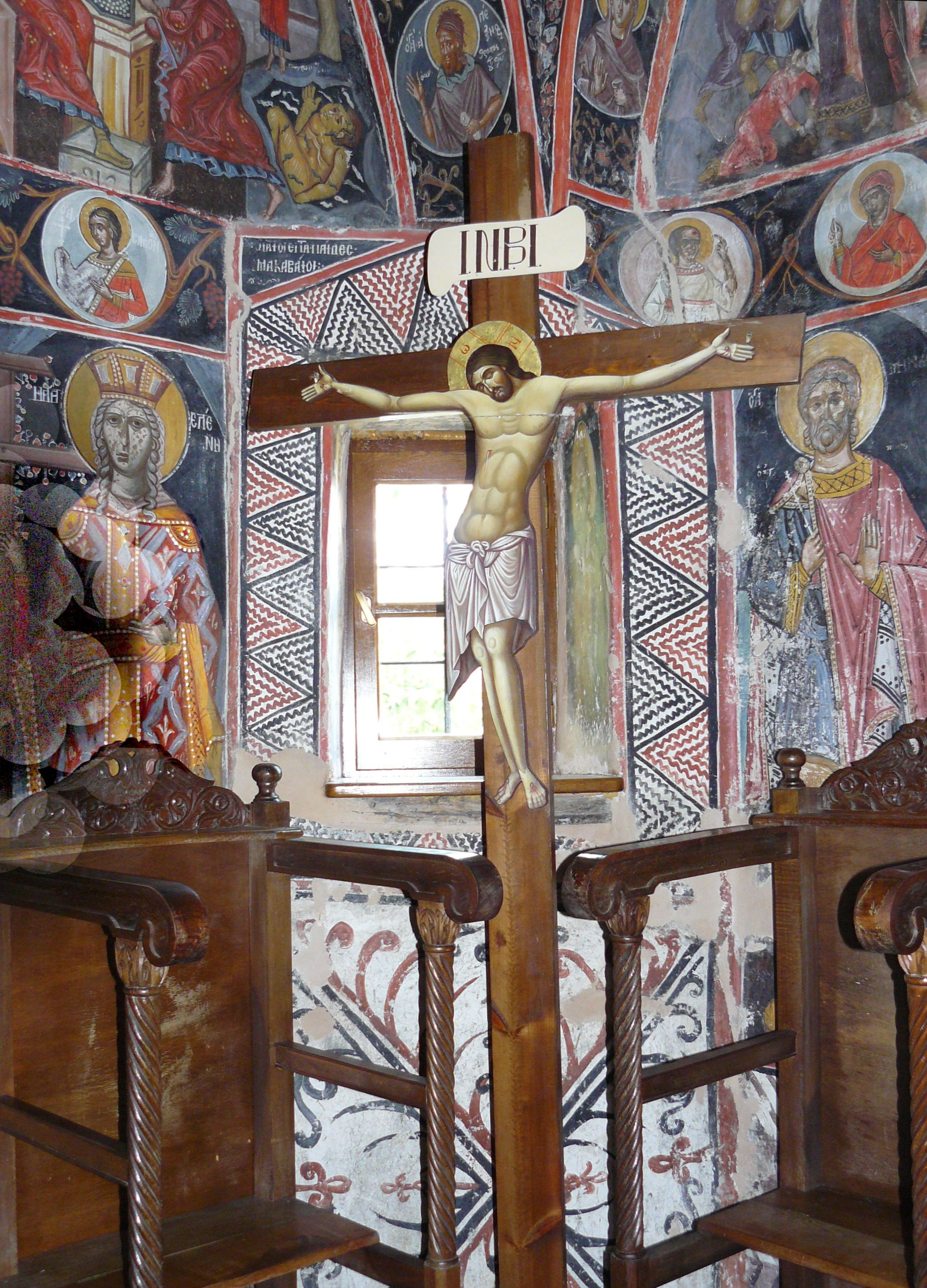
Eastern Orthodox crucifix, displays the lettering in Greek: ΙΝΒΙ (Trapeza of Holy Trinity Monastery, Meteora, Greece).

The initialism INRI represents the Latin inscription Iesvs Nazarenvs Rex Ivdæorvm (Iesus Nazarenus, Rex Iudaeorum), which in English translates to "Jesus the Nazarene, King of the Jews" (John 19:19). John 19:20 states that this was written in three languages – Hebrew, Latin, and Greek – and was put on the cross of Jesus. The Greek version of the initialism reads ΙΝΒΙ, representing Ἰησοῦς ὁ Ναζωραῖος ὁ βασιλεύς τῶν Ἰουδαίων (Iēsoûs ho Nazōraîos ho basileús tôn Ioudaíōn).

Devotional enthusiasm greeted the discovery by Pedro González de Mendoza in 1492 of what was acclaimed as the actual tablet, said to have been brought to Rome by Saint Helena, mother of Emperor Constantine.

=== Western Christianity ===
In Western Christianity, most crucifixes and many depictions of the crucifixion of Jesus include a plaque or parchment placed above his head, called a titulus, or title, bearing only the Latin letters INRI, occasionally carved directly into the cross and usually just above the head of Jesus. The initialism INRI (as opposed to the full inscription) was in use by the 10th century (Gero Cross, Cologne, ca. 970).

=== Eastern Christianity ===
In Eastern Christianity, both the Eastern Orthodox Church and the Eastern Catholic particular churches sui iuris use the Greek letters ΙΝΒΙ, based on the Greek version of the inscription Ἰησοῦς ὁ Ναζωραῖος ὁ βασιλεύς τῶν Ἰουδαίων. Some representations change the title to "ΙΝΒΚ," ὁ βασιλεύς τοῦ κόσμου (ho Basileùs toû kósmou, "The King of the World"), or to ὁ βασιλεύς τῆς Δόξης (ho Basileùs tês Dóxēs, "The King of Glory"), not implying that this was really what was written but reflecting the tradition that icons depict the spiritual reality rather than the physical reality.

The Romanian Orthodox Church uses INRI, since abbreviation in Romanian is exactly the same as in Latin (Iisus Nazarineanul Regele Iudeilor).

Eastern Orthodox Churches that use Church Slavonic in their liturgy use ІНЦІ (INTsI, the equivalent of ΙΝΒΙ for Church Slavonic: І҆и҃съ назѡрѧни́нъ, цр҃ь і҆ꙋде́йскїй) or the abbreviation Царь Сла́вы (Tsar Slávy, "King of Glory").

=== Versions in the gospels ===
	Matthew	Mark	Luke	John
Verse	Matthew 27:37	Mark 15:26	Luke 23:38	John 19:19–20
Greek Inscription	οὗτός ἐστιν Ἰησοῦς ὁ βασιλεὺς τῶν Ἰουδαίων	ὁ βασιλεὺς τῶν Ἰουδαίων	ὁ βασιλεὺς τῶν Ἰουδαίων οὗτος	Ἰησοῦς ὁ Ναζωραῖος ὁ βασιλεὺς τῶν Ἰουδαίων
Transliteration	hûtós estin Iēsûs ho basileùs tôn Iudaéōn	ho basileùs tôn Iudaéōn	ho basileùs tôn Iudaéōn hûtos	Iēsûs ho Nazōraêos ho basileùs tôn Iudaéōn
Vulgata Xystina-Clementina (Latin)	Hic est Iesus rex Iudæorum	Rex Iudæorum	Hic est rex Iudæorum	Iesus Nazarenus, Rex Iudæorum
English translation	This is Jesus, the King of the Jews	The King of the Jews	This is the King of the Jews	Jesus of Nazareth, the King of the Jews
Languages	[none specified]	[none specified]	Hebrew, Latin, Greek (Note: Only some of the extant early Greek manuscripts of Luke’s Gospel include the reference to the languages in verse 23:38. This variance may be a result of later copyists adding to Luke to harmonize that Gospel with the text of John 19:20. The New International Version (NIV) translation and 43 of the 63 translations of Luke 23:38 assembled by BibleGateway.com omit any reference to the languages.)	Hebrew, Latin, Greek
Full verse in KJV	And set up over His head His accusation written, THIS IS JESUS THE KING OF THE JEWS	And the superscription of His accusation was written over, THE KING OF THE JEWS.	And a superscription also was written over Him in letters of Greek, and Latin, and Hebrew, THIS IS THE KING OF THE JEWS.	And Pilate wrote a title, and put it on the cross. And the writing was, JESUS OF NAZARETH THE KING OF THE JEWS. This title then read many of the Jews: for the place where Jesus was crucified was nigh to the city: and it was written in Hebrew, and Greek, and Latin.

=== Other uses of INRI ===
In Spanish, the word inri denotes any insulting or mocking word or phrase; it is usually found in the fixed expression para más/mayor inri (literally "for more/greater insult"), which idiomatically means "to add insult to injury" or "to make matters worse". Its origin is sometimes made clearer by capitalisation para más INRI.

The initials INRI have been reinterpreted with other expansions (backronyms). In an 1825 book on Freemasonry, Marcello Reghellini de Schio alleged that Rosicrucians gave "INRI" alchemical meanings:

- Latin Igne Natura Renovatur Integra ("by fire, nature renews itself"); other sources have Igne Natura Renovando Integrat
- Latin Igne Nitrum Roris Invenitur ("the nitre of dew is found by fire")
- Hebrew ימים, נור, רוח, יבשת (Yammīm, Nūr, Rūaḥ, Yabešet, "water, fire, wind, earth" — the four elements)

Later writers have attributed these to Freemasonry, Hermeticism, or neo-paganism. Aleister Crowley's The Temple of Solomon the King includes a discussion of Augoeides, supposedly written by "Frater P." of the A∴A∴:

For since Intra Nobis Regnum deI [footnote in original: I.N.R.I.], all things are in Ourself, and all Spiritual Experience is a more or less complete Revelation of Him [i.e. Augoeides].

Latin Intra Nobis Regnum deI literally means "Inside Us the Kingdom of god".

Leopold Bloom, the nominally Catholic, ethnically Jewish protagonist of James Joyce's Ulysses, remembers his wife Molly Bloom interpreting INRI as "Iron Nails Ran In". The same meaning is given by a character in Ed McBain's 1975 novel Doors. Most Ulysses translations preserve "INRI" and make a new misinterpretation, such as the French Il Nous Refait Innocents "he makes us innocent again".

=== Isopsephy ===
In isopsephy, the Greek term (βασιλεὺς τῶν Ἰουδαίων) receives a value of 3343 whose digits seem to correspond to a suggested date for the crucifixion of Jesus, (33, April, 3rd day).

== Gallery ==
=== Biblical scenes ===
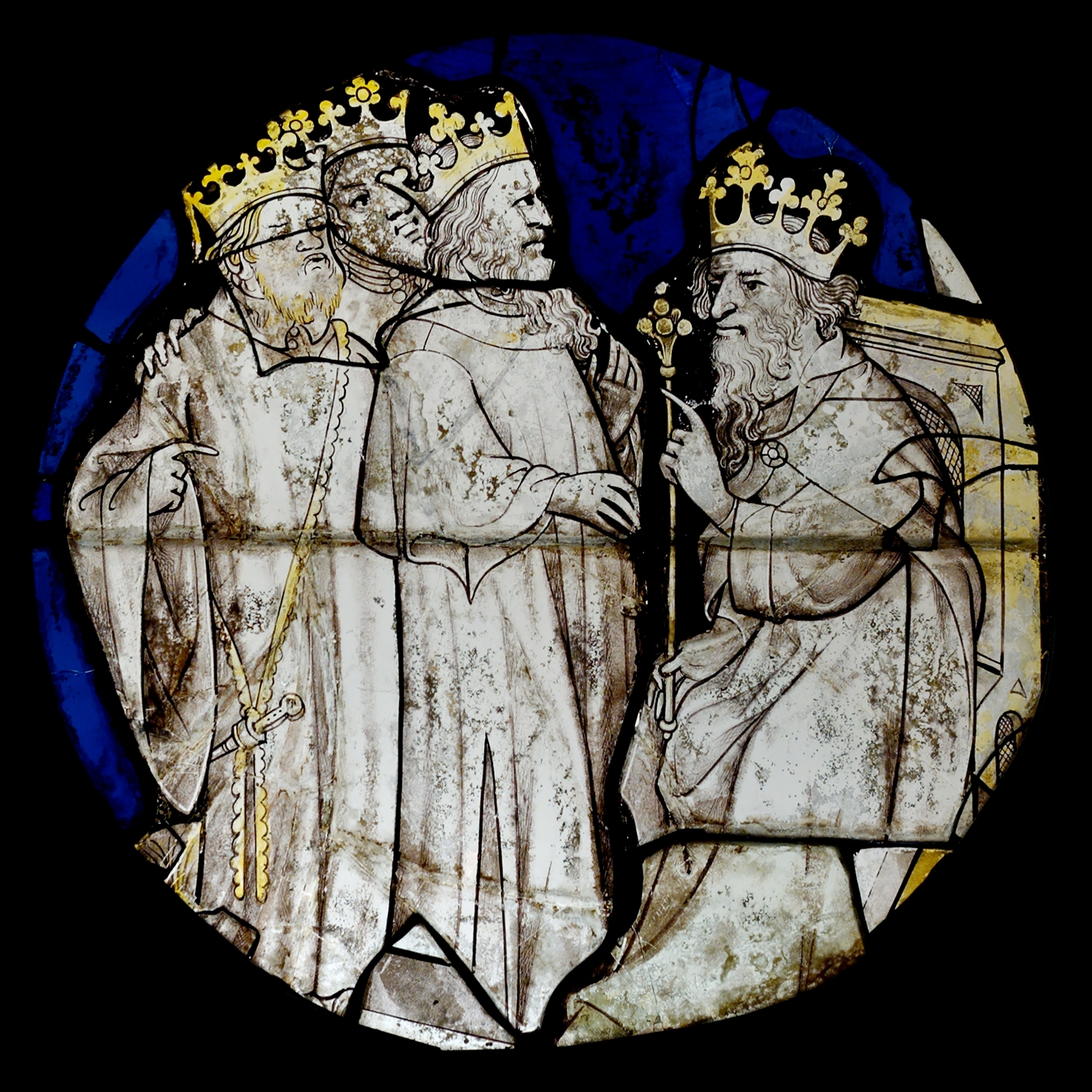
The Magi visit Herod to ask about the newborn King of the Jews, Matthew 2:2.

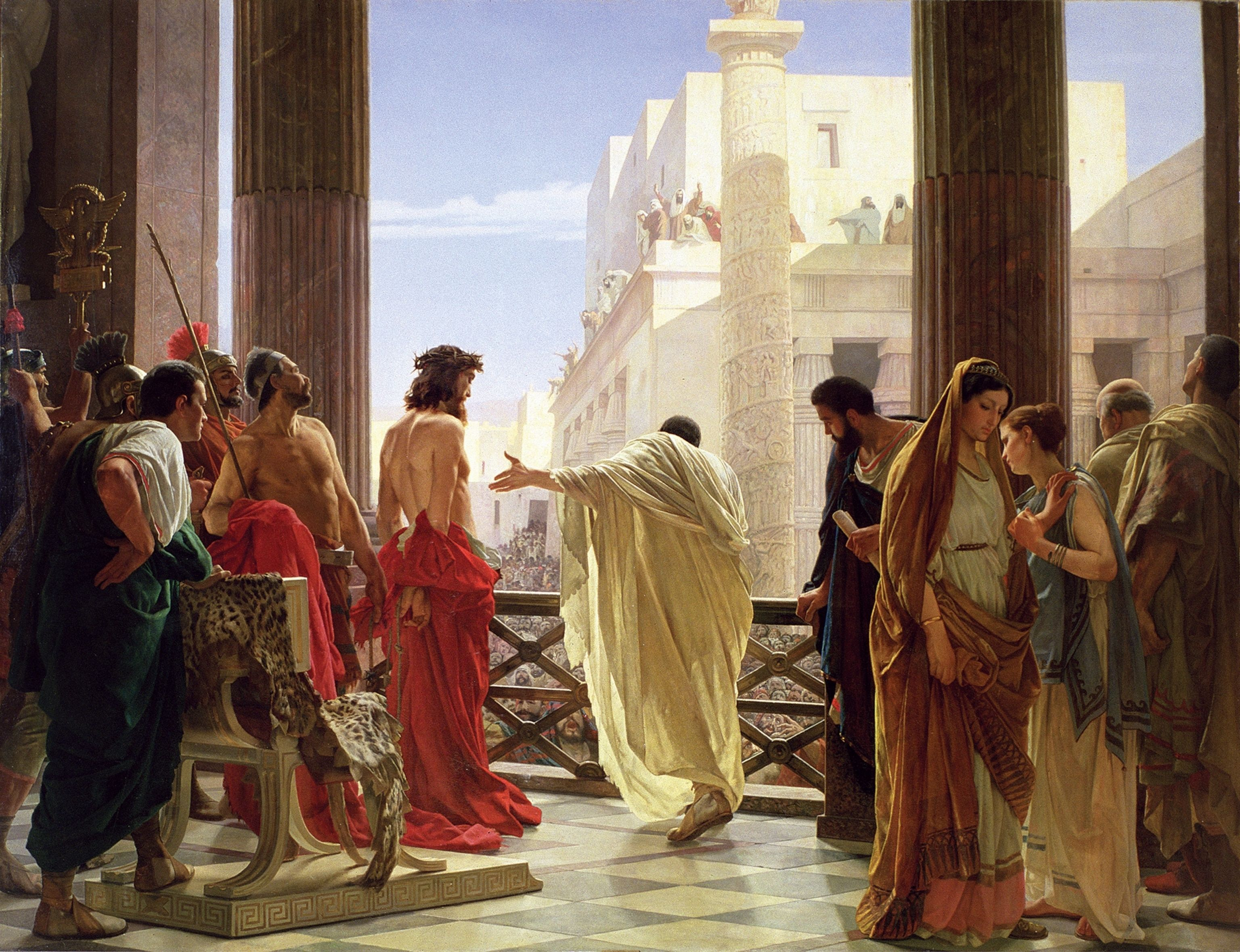
Pilate, trying and handing over Jesus, the King of the Jews, Mark 15:2

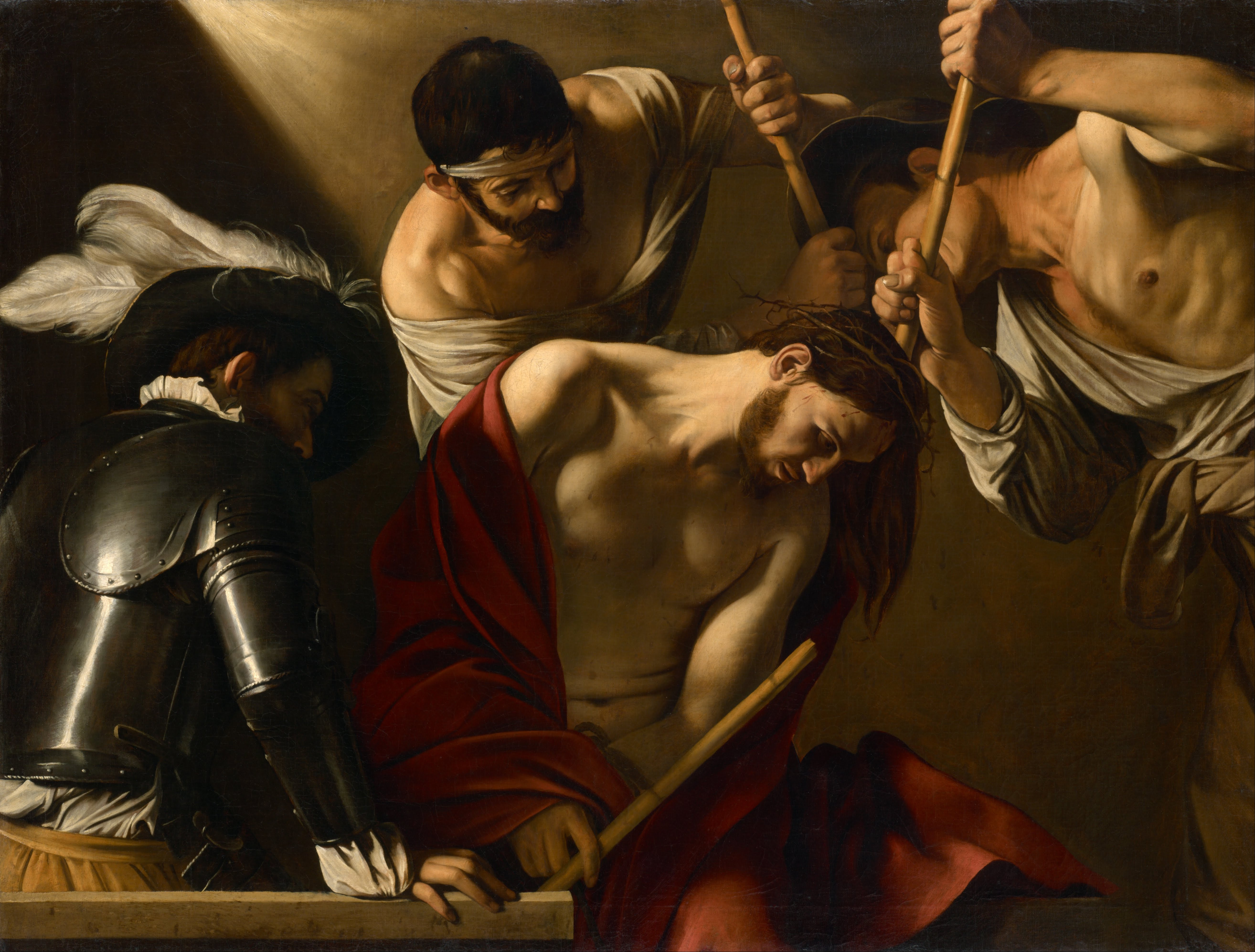
Jesus with a royal purple robe mocked and beaten as the King of the Jews, John 19:2–3

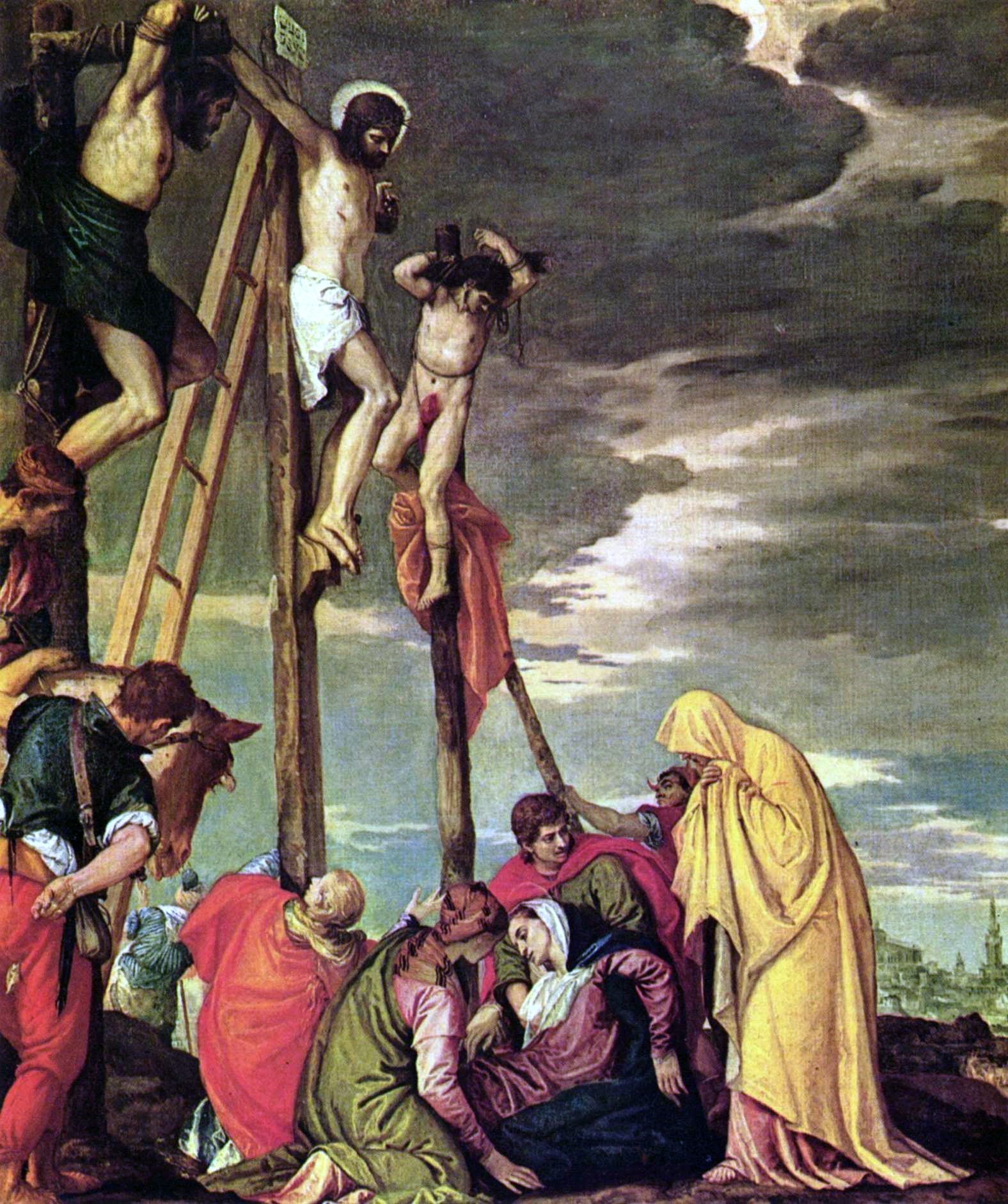
Jesus, on the cross, is mocked in Calvary as the King of the Jews, Luke 23:36–37.

=== INRI examples ===
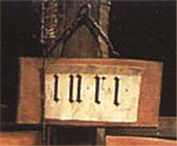
INRI from the Isenheim Altarpiece

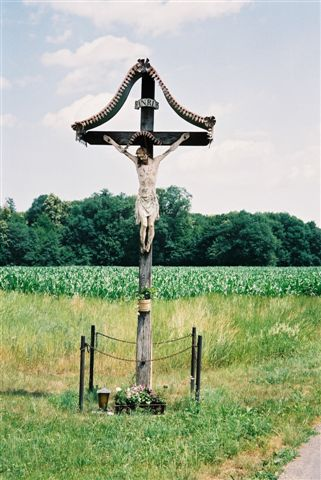
A Latin crucifix with a stylized INRI plaque attached, in cornfields near Mureck, Styria, Austria

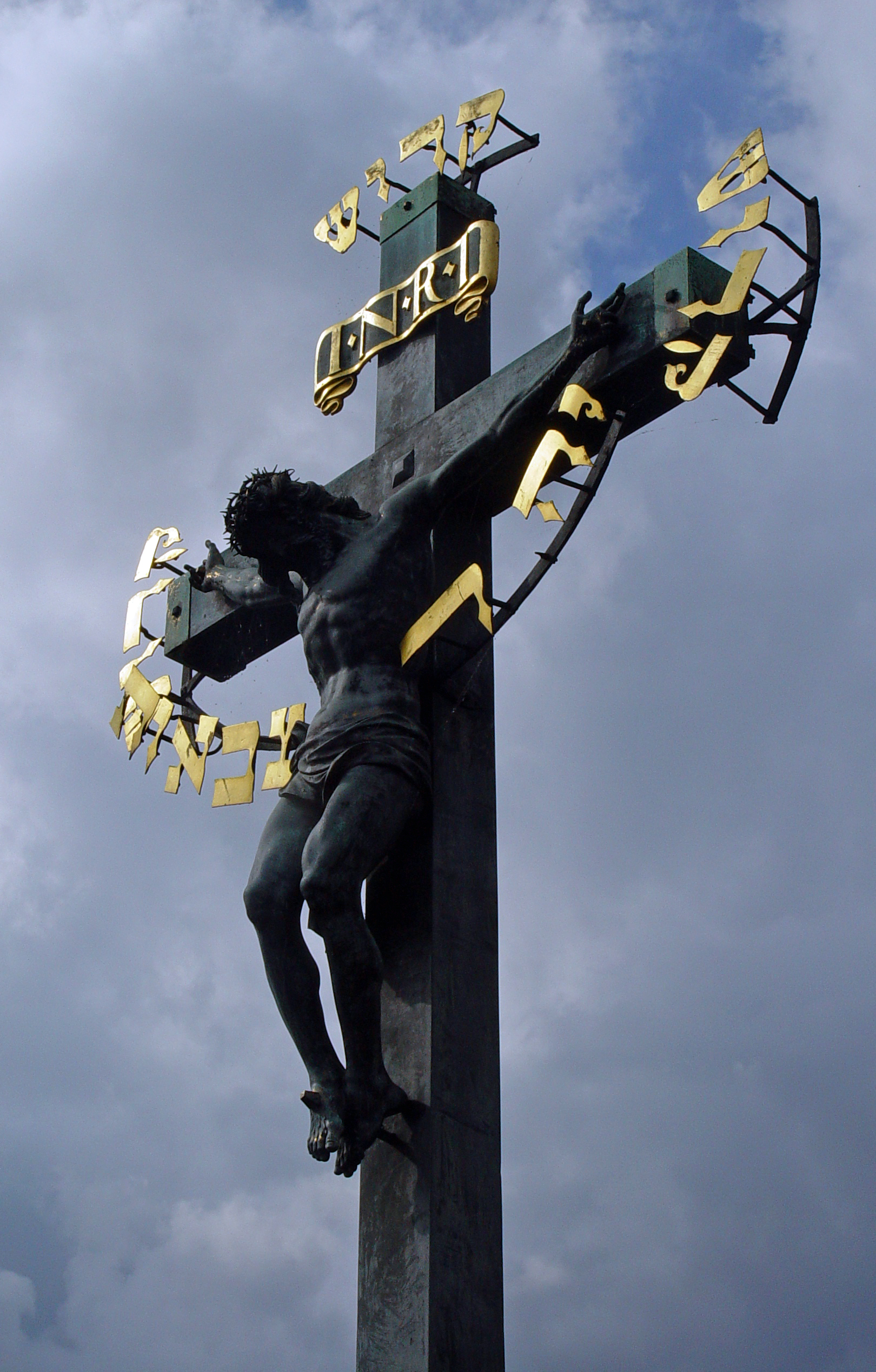
INRI plaque attached to Crucifix and Calvary statue on the north side of Charles Bridge, Prague

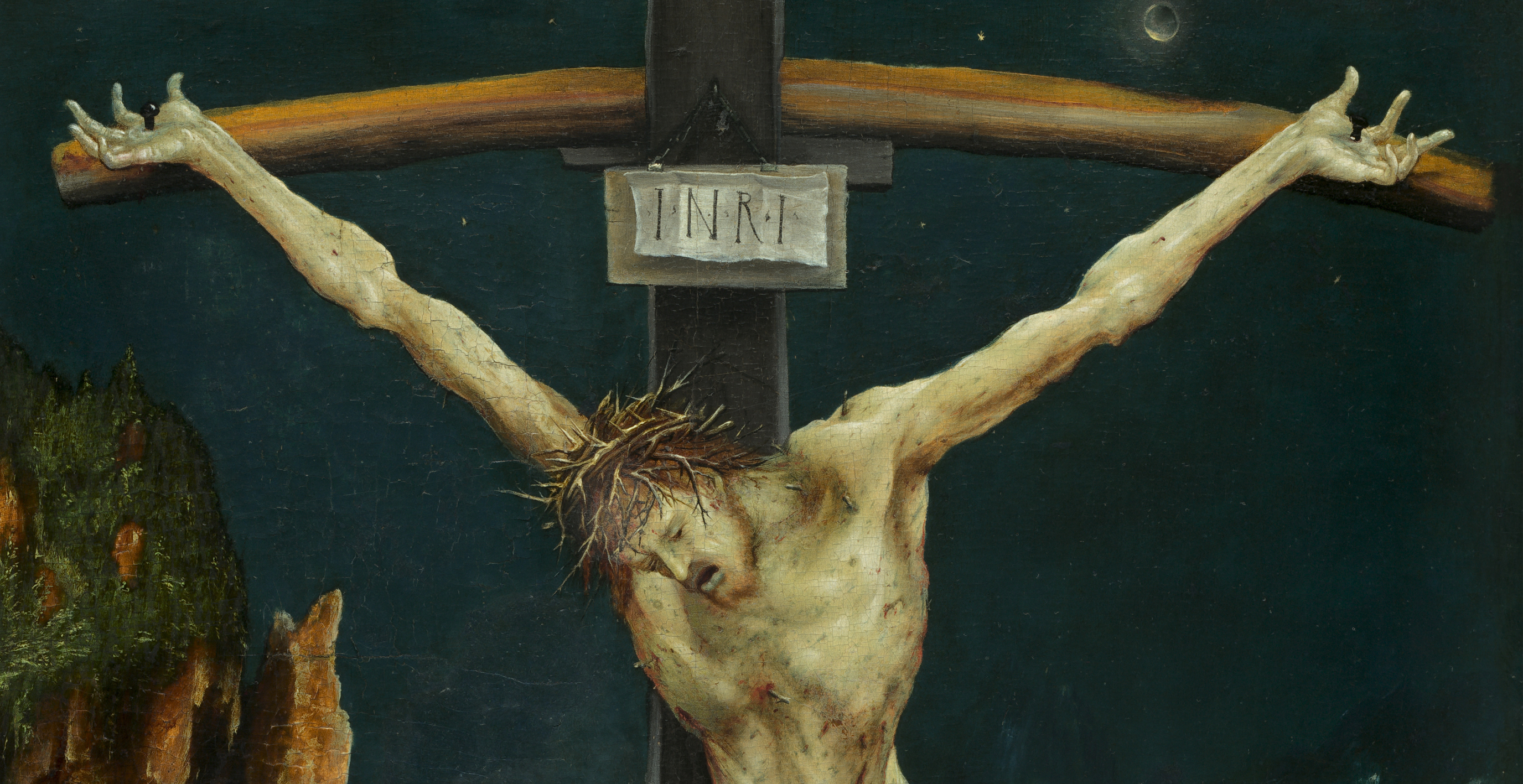
Detail of The Small Crucifixion, painting by Matthias Grünewald, c. 1510, National Gallery of Art, Washington

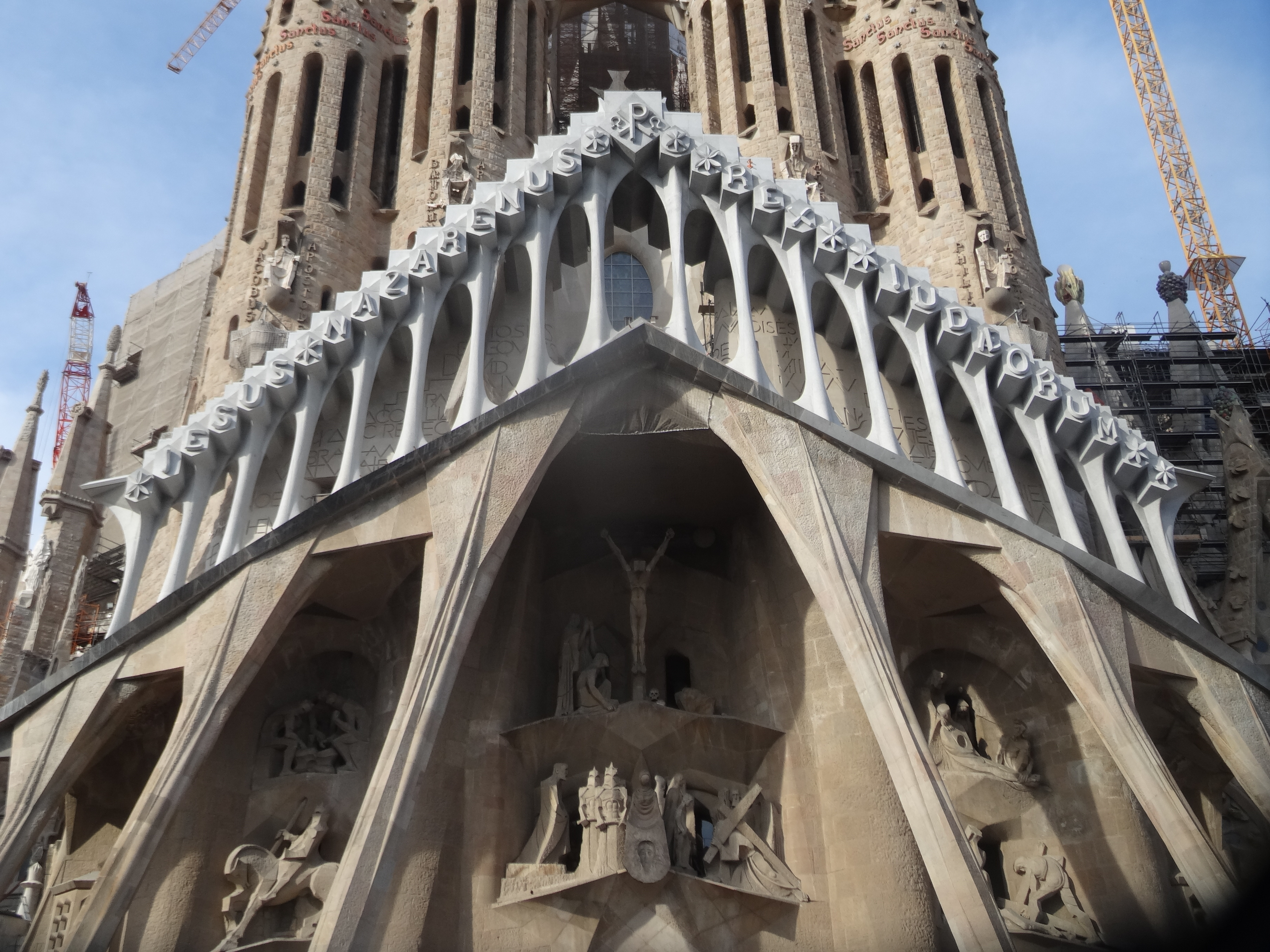
iesus nazarenus rex iudæorum on the side of the Sagrada Familia

== See also ==
- Christ the King
- Ichthys
- Names and titles of Jesus in the New Testament
- Titulus Crucis
