= Pansy, West Virginia =

- Unincorporated community
- Location within West Virginia Location within the United States
- Coordinates: 38°53′48″N 79°11′52″W
- Country: United States
- State: West Virginia
- County: Grant
- Elevation: 1,093 ft (333 m)
- Time zone: UTC-5 (Eastern (EST))
  - Summer (DST): UTC-4 (EDT)
- Area codes: 304 & 681
- GNIS feature ID: 1554906

Pansy is an unincorporated community in Grant County, West Virginia, USA. Located on U.S. Route 220 6.45 miles (10.38 km) south-southwest of Petersburg, the community most likely was named after the garden pansy.
