= Pansy, Missouri =

Unincorporated community in Missouri, U.S.

Coordinates: 36°56′17″N 92°50′45″W

Pansy, Missouri is a community and former post office in western Douglas County in the U.S. State of Missouri.

The community is located along the east side of the Little Beaver Creek valley (elevation approximately 1100 feet) at the west end of Missouri Route NN approximately 2.5 miles west of Red Bank. The old Breeden School was located just over one mile to the north-northwest along Breeden Creek. Keyger Mountain (peak elevation 1649 feet) lies 2.5 miles to the north at the head of Breeden Creek.

A Colonel Huffman started the post office and store for the community in 1899. He named it for his daughter. The Pansy post office would remain in operation until 1935.
