= Breeden Creek =

Stream in Ozarks

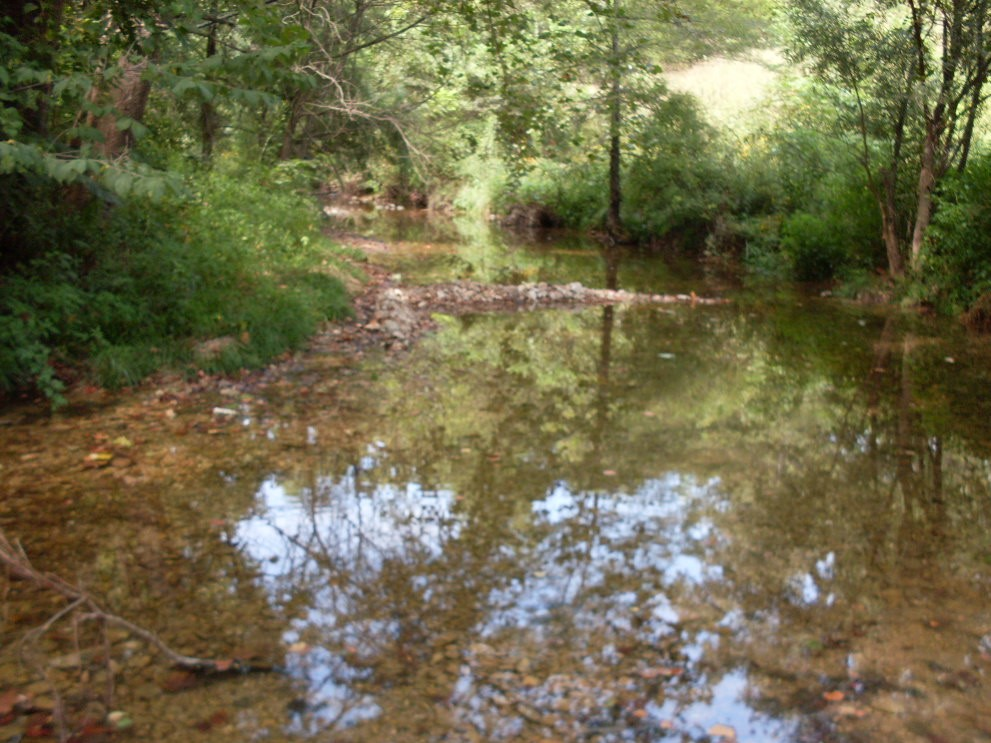
Looking upstream from a crossing of Breeden Creek

Breeden Creek is a stream in western Douglas County in the Ozarks of south central Missouri. The stream is a tributary to Little Beaver Creek.

The stream headwaters arise at 36°58′01″N 92°50′58″W at an elevation of approximately 1300 feet. The headwaters are on the south flank of Keyger Mountain which rises to a peak elevation of over 1660 feet just one-half mile from source. The stream flows generally south to its confluence with Little Beaver at 36°56′23″N 92°50′42″W at an elevation of 1099 feet. The stream confluence lies approximately one quarter mile northwest of the community of Pansy at the end of Missouri Route NN.

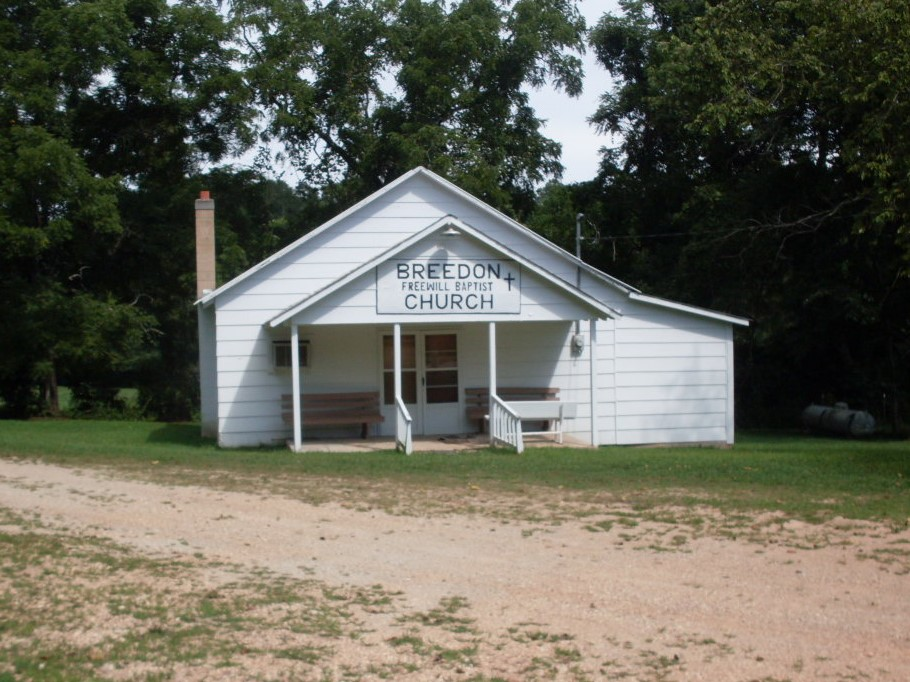
Church and cemetery adjacent to Breeden Creek

The stream along with the old Breeden School that was adjacent to it bears the name of a local family in the area.
