= Danny Breeden =

American baseball player (born 1942)

- Catcher
- Born: June 27, 1942 (age 82); Albany, Georgia, U.S.
- Batted: Right Threw: Right

MLB debut
- July 24, 1969, for the Cincinnati Reds

Last MLB appearance
- June 17, 1971, for the Chicago Cubs

MLB statistics
- Batting average: .151
- Home runs: 0
- Runs batted in: 5

Teams
- Cincinnati Reds (1969); Chicago Cubs (1971)

Danny Richard Breeden (born June 27, 1942) is an American former professional baseball player. He played in Major League Baseball as a catcher from 1969 to 1971 for the Cincinnati Reds and the Chicago Cubs.

== Baseball career ==
Breeden was born in Albany, Georgia where he graduated from Albany High School. He attended Troy State University before being signed by the St. Louis Cardinals in 1963 as an amateur free agent.

Even before making the majors, Breeden had been part of several player transactions. In December 1963, he was drafted by the Chicago Cubs in the first-year draft but the following year he was purchased back by the Cardinals. In December 1968, he was part of a multi-player trade to the San Diego Padres, and on in June 1969 he was purchased by the Reds.

Less than a month after being purchased by the Reds, he made his big league debut at age 27 on July 24, 1969 against Gary Gentry and the New York Mets at Shea Stadium. Breeden, starting at catcher, notched his first career hit in his first at-bat with a second-inning single, going 1-for-4 in the game. The Reds defeated the Mets 4-3 in 12 innings on a Tony Pérez home run.

That one single would be his only big league hit that season. He played in only that series against the Mets as starting catcher Johnny Bench was not available, and he was 0-for-4 in his final two games of the season.

Breeden spent the 1970 season in the Reds' minor league system, and was traded to the Cubs for Willie Smith on November 30, 1970.

In 1971, Breeden played in 25 games for the Cubs, including catching the second of Ken Holtzman's two no-hitters on June 3 in a 1-0 Cubs win over the Reds at Cincinnati's Riverfront Stadium.

The 1971 season was also his brother Hal's rookie season with the Cubs, and they played on the field together for five games. Danny batted .154 in 65 at-bats, hitting no home runs and driving in four runs. He hit the only extra-base hit of his career in his first game of the season, on May 1 against Rick Wise and the Philadelphia Phillies. His brother Hal hit .139 in 36 at-bats. The 1971 season was Danny Breeden's last one in the majors.

After 1971 Breeden played in the minors two more seasons for the Cubs, San Francisco Giants and San Diego Padres organizations. He was sent from the Padres to the Cardinals to complete a three-team deal from November 18, 1974 when Ed Brinkman went from San Diego to St. Louis for Sonny Siebert, Alan Foster and Rich Folkers after having been traded along with Bob Strampe and Dick Sharon from the Detroit Tigers for Nate Colbert.

His brother, Hal Breeden, also played in Major League Baseball. In 2005, he was inducted into the Albany High School Sports Hall of Fame, joining his brother, who was inducted in 1996.
