= Multiverse (Michael Moorcock) =

Parallel universes in Michael Moorcock's fiction

The multiverse is a series of parallel universes in many of the science fiction and fantasy novels and short stories written by Michael Moorcock (many other fictional settings also have the concept of a multiverse). Central to these works is the concept of an Eternal Champion who has potentially multiple identities across multiple dimensions. The multiverse contains a legion of different versions of Earth in various times, histories, and occasionally, sizes. One example is the world in which his Elric Saga takes place. The multiplicity of places in this collection of universes include London, Melniboné, Tanelorn, the Young Kingdoms, and the Realm of Dreams.
