= C. David Breeden =

American sculptor (1938–2006)

- Born: May 29, 1938; Fairfax, Virginia
- Died: September 12, 2006 (aged 68); Charlottesville, Virginia
- Known for: Sculpture

Conway David Breeden (May 29, 1938 – September 12, 2006) was an American sculptor.

His early works were created in his hometown of Manassas, Virginia, where he participated in the family trade of land development. He attended Greenbrier Military School in Lewisburg, West Virginia and Carnegie-Mellon Institute in Pittsburgh. He lived in Brazil and Botswana before coming to Charlottesville in 1974, where he became a well-known figure in the local arts scene. He created the majority of his artwork at Biscuit Run, his studio and house, south of town. His media ranged from native Virginia soapstone, alabaster, stained glass, bronze, ceramic, fabric, metal, and concrete to esoteric media collected at auctions and in scrapyards.

The monumental works of David Breeden stand before courthouses in Roanoke and Charlottesville, Virginia, as well as in front of and inside churches and at Universities such as Penn State at York and the University of Virginia. They adorn cityscapes in Pittsburgh, Charlottesville, Negril, (Jamaica) and St. John's (Antigua). They are made of soapstone, dalle de verre glass and fiberglass mortar. Breeden’s legacy is still on display at Biscuit Run’s gallery and in private collections around the world.
