= Senator Breeden =

Senator Breeden may refer to:

- Brick Breeden (1904–1977), Montana State Senate
- Edward L. Breeden Jr. (1905–1990), Virginia State Senate
- Shirley Breeden (born 1955), Nevada State Senate
