= Carl Breeden =

English industrialist and cricketer

Carl Louis "Charles" Breeden (10 February 1891 – 2 November 1951) was an English automotive industry engineer, entrepreneur and a first-class cricketer. He was born in Moseley, Birmingham and died at Claverdon, Warwickshire.

Breeden was a Lucas employee who acquired an interest in the Wilmot company, a long-established Birmingham silversmiths, which accounts for the Wilmot Breeden company name. Wilmot stayed with the company until 1949 at least, and the title was hyphenated until the early fifties. By the time of Breeden's death in 1951 it employed more than 5,000 people. Breeden had brought back from the United States the concept of attached metal bumpers or fenders. Breeden was approached by William Morris, probably in 1928, and asked to supply bumpers for the new Morris Minor. With very little in the way of facilities he delivered the first batch within three months of commencement. He subsequently began supplying Austin, Wolseley, and eventually almost every UK vehicle maker. The Wilmot part of the business concentrated upon smaller parts, developing new techniques of pressure die casting and chromium plating which made them market leaders. By 1931 the company had issued a catalogue which contained many other types of automotive components including door locks. It is one of the direct antecedents of the current Inteva Products international components group. He was well-connected within the automotive industry in other ways too. In 1914, he married Hilda, the daughter of Harry Lucas, son of the founder of Lucas Industries and the head of that company; in 1951, just six months before he died, his younger son married a daughter of Leonard Lord, the head of the Austin Motor Company and the architect of the British Motor Corporation. Before the First World War, Breeden had worked with Oliver Lucas of the Lucas Industries group to develop the dynamo for use on motorcycles, which were a fast-growing industry in Birmingham.

Breeden was educated at King Edward's School, Birmingham where he was captain of the cricket team in 1909, and he played a few matches for Warwickshire County Cricket Club's second eleven in that year too. He was a middle-order right-handed batsman and a right-arm medium pace bowler. In 1910, he appeared in five first-class cricket matches for the Warwickshire first team in a three-week period in mid-summer. He was not a success, and his highest score was 27, which he made in the course of an innings defeat by Leicestershire. Though his bowling had proved occasionally useful in second eleven matches, he bowled only seven overs in first-class cricket and did not take a wicket. He did not play any more first-class cricket after this season, though he continued to appear in minor games up to 1930.

Breeden was a significantly wealthy man when he died, and death duties on his estate amounted to more than £500,000. The annual general meeting of the company the year after his death was told that he had arranged for his two sons to be joint managing directors of the Wilmot-Breeden group and for his elder son to be chairman as well.
