= Pansy Stockton =

American artist

Pansy C. Stockton
- Born: Pansy Cornelia Repass; March 31, 1895; El Dorado Springs, Missouri
- Died: February 20, 1972 (aged 76); Colorado Springs, Colorado
- Education: Cory School
- Known for: "sun paintings"
- Spouses: Roscoe K. Stockton; Howard W. Fatheree

Pansy Cornelia Stockton (née Pansy Cornelia Repass; March 31, 1895 – February 20, 1972) was an American visual artist.

== Life and career ==
Pansy Cornelia Stockton was born on March 31, 1895, in El Dorado Springs, Missouri. At age six, she traveled by late model covered wagon to Colorado, moving around with her family from La Junta to Durango to Silverton to Fruita and finally to Eldorado Springs, Colorado where her parents ran a resort hotel. Stockton was known for "sun paintings and landscapes using bark, moss, leaves and other flora" in her work. Over the course of her career "Stockton used fragments of hundreds of varieties of vegetations as mediums in her work. These elements included ferns, bark, weeds, leaves, and twigs, and some of her pictures had as many as 1,000 components, and during her career she worked with 250 kinds of vegetation from all over the world. On the backs of some of these assemblages, she listed the items and where she found them." She made her first sun painting in 1916 when she was living in Durango, Colorado. Pansy was one of the 52 original founding members of the Denver Artists Guild in 1928, later renamed the Colorado Artists Guild in 1990.

In 1936 Stockton was formally adopted by the Ogallala Sioux for interceding on their behalf to help preserve their land and rights. She had become known as "Poncita" and her father was Chief Dan Flies (also known as Buffalo Bill's compatriot). She settled in Santa Fe, New Mexico in 1942 and died in Colorado Springs, Colorado in 1972. During her lifetime she had numerous solo exhibitions, particularly at the New Mexico Museum of Art. She gained notoriety for appearing on the popular television show This Is Your Life in 1953 and was the subject of five Hollywood film shorts. Her work is in the collections of the New Mexico Museum of Art, Panhandle-Plains Historical Museum and the Stark Museum of Art, as well as her close family's homes.
