= Papyrus 121 =

- New Testament manuscript
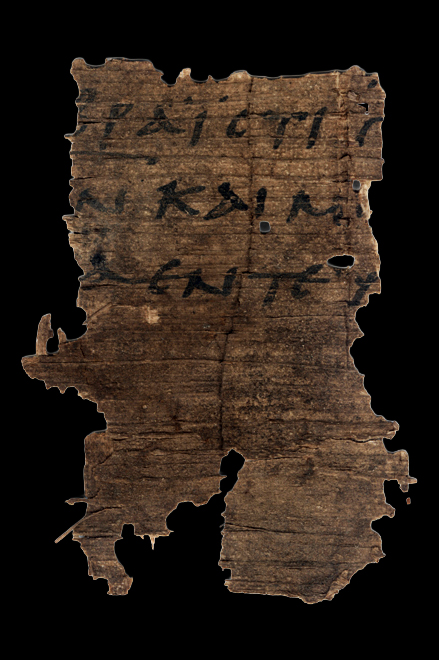
- Recto, John 19:17-18
- Name: P. Oxy. 4805
- Sign: 𝔓^{121}
- Text: Gospel of John 19:17-18,25-26
- Date: 3rd century
- Script: Greek
- Found: Oxyrhynchus, Egypt
- Now at: Sackler Library
- Cite: R. Hatzilambrou, P. J. Parsons, J. Chapa, OP LXXI (London: 2007), pp. 9-11.
- Size: [4.5] x [3.3] cm (28 x 12)
- Type: unknown
- Category: none
- Note: nomina sacra, diaeresis

Papyrus 121, also known as P. Oxy. LXXI 4805, is an early copy of the New Testament in Greek. It is a papyrus manuscript of the Gospel of John in a fragmentary condition. It is designated by the siglum 𝔓^{121} in the Gregory-Aland numbering of New Testament manuscripts. The surviving texts of John are only fragments of verses 19:17-18,25-26. Using the study of comparative writing styles (palaeography), it has been assigned to the 3rd century by the INTF.

The manuscript currently is housed at the Papyrology Rooms of the Sackler Library at Oxford with the shelf number P. Oxy. 4805.

== Description ==
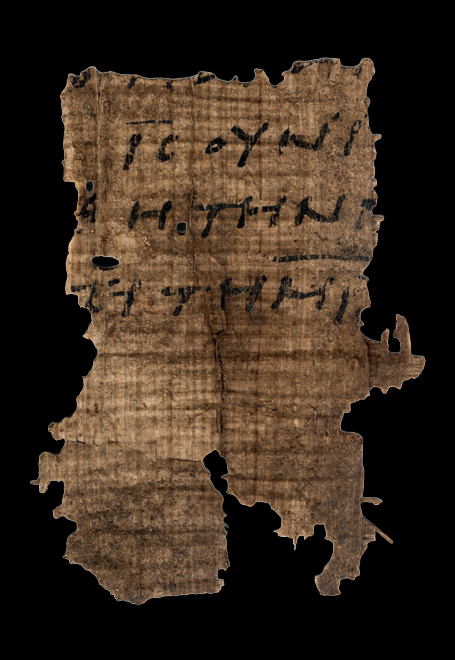
Verso, John 19:25-26

The manuscript is written irregular, spaces between letters are not equal. Though the text is very small, it contains two of the nomina sacra: Ι̅Σ̅ and Μ̅Η̅Ι̅ (dative case from Μ̅Η̅Ρ̅). Above letter iota two dots (diaeresis). On page recto, in lower line, from the left a scribe did not use letter iota in word και (and), though inserted diaeresis above letter alpha. Possibly it is a scribal error.

== Text ==
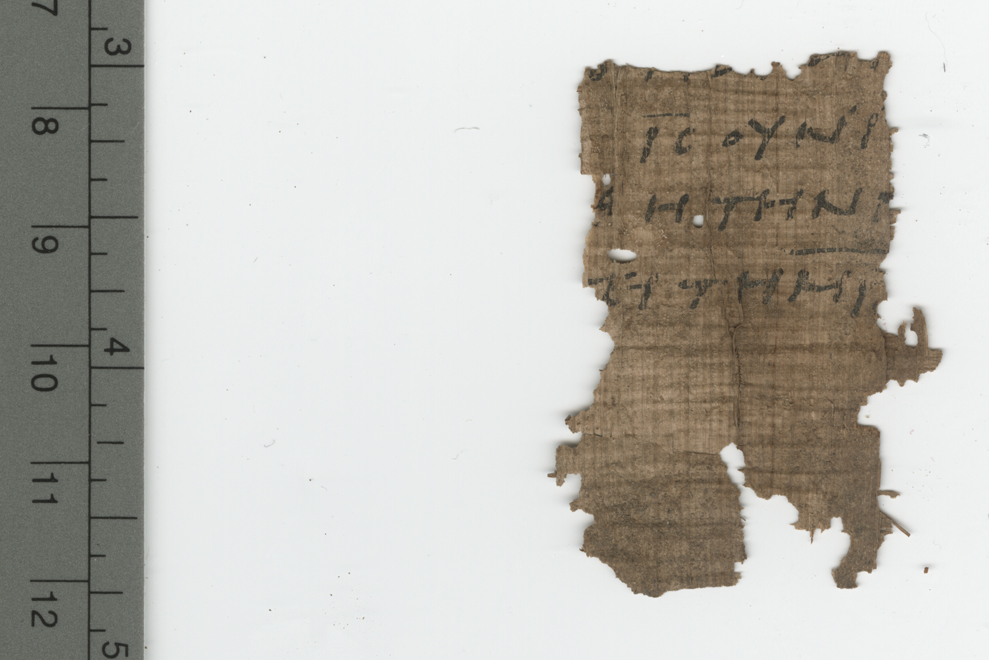
Papyrus 121 V

The Greek text of the codex is too brief to determine its textual character. It can not be placed to any of Categories of New Testament manuscripts. It contains only 20 letters on recto, and 18 letters on verso.

Transcription of Papyrus Manuscript

Page recto of 𝔓^{121}	Page verso of 𝔓^{121}
νιου Τοπον ο λεγεται Εβραιστι Γολγοθα οπου αυτον εσταρωσαν και μετ' αυτου αλλους δυο εντευθεν κα εντευθεν μεσον	η Ι̅Σ̅ ουν ιδων την μητερα και τον μαθητην παρεστωτα ον ηγαπα λεγει τη Μ̅Η̅Ι̅ Γυναι ιδε ο υιος
...place, which is called in Hebrew Golgotha. There they crucified him, and with him two others, one on either side, and Jesus between	When Jesus saw his mother, and the disciple whom he loved standing near, he said to his mother, "Woman, behold, your son!"

Missing letters are in red; extant letters in black.

== See also ==
- List of New Testament papyri
- Oxyrhynchus Papyri
