= Hal Breeden =

American baseball player (1944–2021)

- First baseman
- Born: June 28, 1944; Albany, Georgia, U.S.
- Died: May 3, 2021 (aged 76); Leesburg, Georgia, U.S.
- Batted: Right Threw: Left

Professional debut
- MLB: April 7, 1971, for the Chicago Cubs
- NPB: April 4, 1976, for the Hanshin Tigers

Last appearance
- MLB: September 11, 1975, for the Montreal Expos
- NPB: May 6, 1978, for the Hanshin Tigers

MLB statistics
- Batting average: .243
- Home runs: 21
- Runs batted in: 76
- Stats at Baseball Reference

Teams
- Chicago Cubs (1971); Montreal Expos (1972–1975); Hanshin Tigers (1976–1978)

Harold Noel Breeden (June 28, 1944 – May 3, 2021) was an American Major League Baseball player. Hal was a rarity in that he was a right-handed hitter who threw left-handed. He was also the brother of catcher Danny Breeden. After retirement from baseball, he served as Sheriff of Lee County, Georgia for twenty years until 2008.

== Career ==
Signed by the Milwaukee Braves as a free-agent in 1963, Breeden was a very solid minor league hitter. For example, he hit .330 in 116 games with the Waycross Braves in 1963. In 75 games with the Yakima Bears in 1964, Breeden hit .406. He played with two teams in 1967 — the West Palm Beach Braves and Kinston Eagles — and between the two of them he hit .310 in 139 games. Breeden also attained a power stroke in the minors, hitting 37 home runs in 136 games for the Richmond Braves in 1970.

He was developing himself into a notable prospect - or at least the Chicago Cubs thought so - because on November 30, 1970, he was traded straight up for future Hall of Fame pitcher Hoyt Wilhelm.

Not long after being traded to the Cubs, Breeden found himself in a big league uniform. He made his Major League debut on April 7, 1971 against Steve Carlton and the St. Louis Cardinals. Pinch hitting for Earl Stephenson in the bottom of the seventh inning, Hal grounded out in his only at-bat of the game. Overall, his first season in the Majors was fairly unsuccessful — in 23 games, he collected five hits in 36 at-bats for a .139 batting average. Hal played alongside his brother for a few games in 1971, as they were teammates for a while.

On April 7, 1972, Breeden was traded with Héctor Torres to the Montreal Expos for Dan McGinn.

With the Expos, Breeden was never a starter. His best season was 1973, when in 105 games he collected 71 hits in 258 at-bats for a .275 batting average. He also belted 15 home runs, 10 doubles and six triples for a .535 slugging percentage. Of all the players who appeared in 100 or more games for the Expos that year, Breeden had the highest slugging percentage. On 13 July 1973, Breeden tied Joe Cronin of the 1943 Boston Red Sox for the record for most pinch-hit home runs in a double header, at two.

Breeden played his final big league game on September 11, 1975. Afterwards, he played three seasons in Japan with the Hanshin Tigers. Overall in his career, he played in 273 games, collecting 148 hits in 608 at-bats for a .243 batting average. He scored 61 runs, drove 76 runs in, hit 28 doubles, six triples and 21 home runs. He did not steal a single base in his career, although he tried twice. He walked 69 times and he had 107 strikeouts. Tommy John called Breeden "a good pull hitter."
