= The Dormition of the Virgin (Victor) =

Painting by Victor (iconographer)

- Η Κοίμηση της Θεοτόκου (Greek), Dormizione di Maria (Italian)
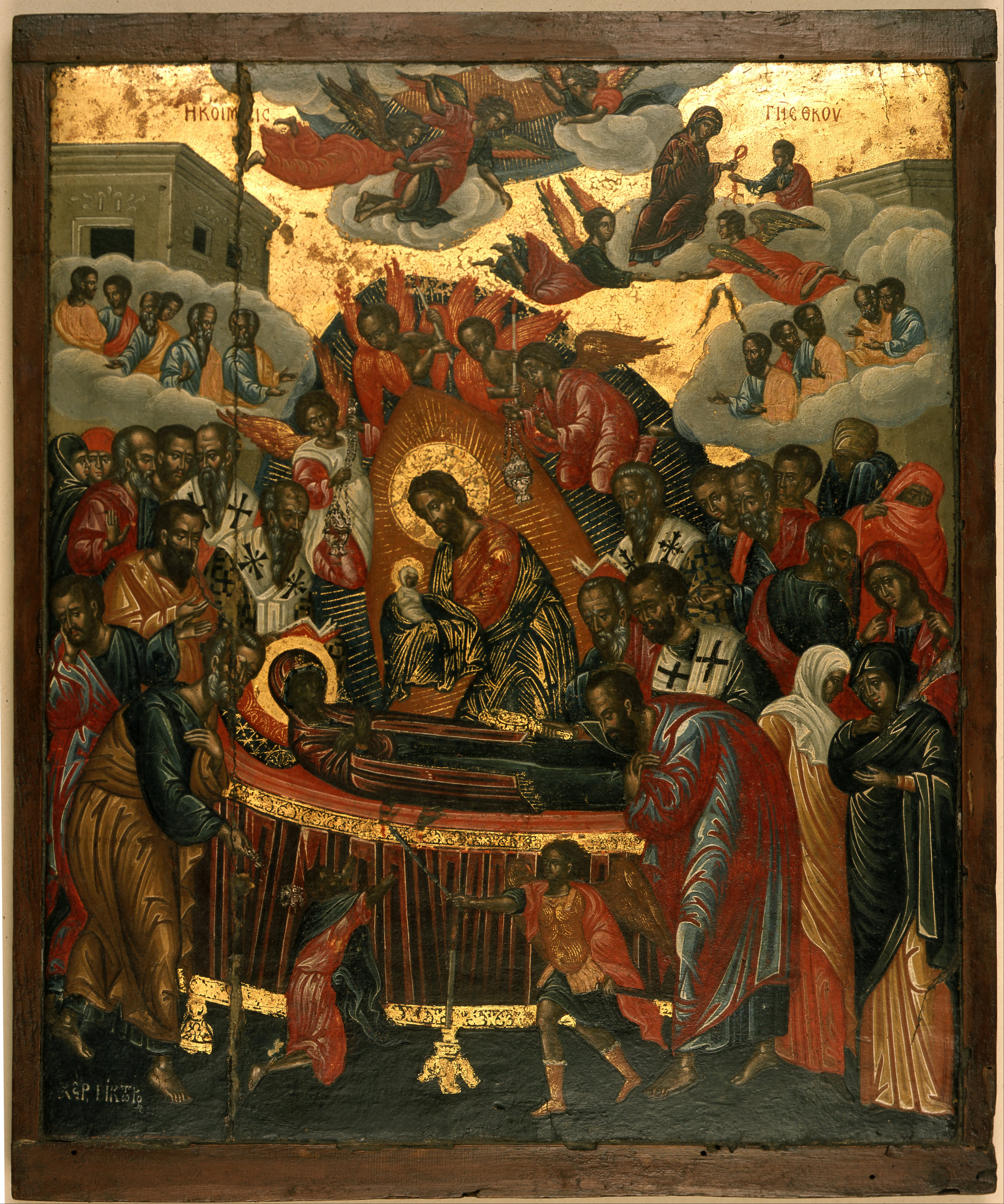
- Artist: Victor
- Year: 1650 - 1699
- Medium: tempera on wood
- Movement: Late Cretan School
- Subject: The Dormition of the Virgin
- Dimensions: 42 cm × 35.5 cm (16.5 in × 14 in)
- Location: Benaki Museum, Athens, Greece
- Owner: Benaki Museum
- Accession: ΓΕ 3004
- Website: Official

The Dormition of the Virgin is an egg tempera painting created by Greek priest and painter Victor. Victor of Crete is another name frequently used by the painter who was active from 1645 to 1696. Victor was a member of the Late Cretan School. Victor was born in the city of Chandaka, which is now modern-day Heraklion, Crete. He was employed as a priest at the Church of Agios Ioannis. The painter traveled all over the Venetian empire, eventually settling on the island of Zakinthos. Victor was a very important Greek painter because his catalog of existing works exceeds ninety-five paintings. Two of his notable works include Christ the Vine and The Nativity.

An important event in Christianity is the Dormition of the Mother of God, which is typically celebrated on August 15. The event celebrates the "falling asleep" (death) of the Virgin Mary. Mary lived 11 years after the death of Jesus, dying in AD 41 according to Hippolytus of Thebes. According to the Hermeneia, three bishops are represented in the scene of the Dormition, they are: Dionysius the Areopagite, Hierotheos the Thesmothete, and Saint Timothy. When there is a fourth, it is James, brother of Jesus. Saint Peter is usually at the Virgin's head, sensing her body while Saint Paul bows at her feet. Both figures are the pillars of the church and are frequently depicted in paintings of this nature. Another recurring figure is John the Apostle, who is usually in the middle ground close to the bier. Jesus instructed John to care for his mother when he was on the cross, and he is an important figure at the Dormition. Doubting Thomas, in paintings of this nature, is depicted receiving the holy girdle of the Virgin because he missed the event by three days.

The Dormition scene has been depicted in art since the dawn of the new religion. Countless artists have used the subject in their works. One example is an Ivory Dormition plaque completed in Constantinople around 1000 A.D. Another version of the scene is a 13th-century work housed at Saint Catherine's Monastery on Mount Sinai. In 1310, Giotto completed his version of the work called The Death of the Virgin Mary. Around the same period, Victor completed his version of the Dormation; two painters, named Moskos, painted similar works. The Dormition and Assumption of the Virgin by Elias Moskos and The Dormition of the Virgin by Ioannis Moskos. Both works represented the Late Cretan school. Victor's painting can be found at the Benaki Museum in Athens, Greece.

== Description ==
The height of the work was 16.5 in. (42 cm), and the width 14 in. (35.5 cm). The materials used were tempera and gold leaf on a wood panel. The work of art is similar to The Dormition and Assumption of the Virgin by Elias Moskos and The Dormition of the Virgin by Ioannis Moskos. All three works are examples of the style implemented during the late Cretan School. All three painters utilize the Venetian-influenced Cretan style of painting, creating a more refined maniera greca.

The traditional figures of Iefonia (Ιεφονία) and the angel with the sword appear in the foreground. The figures are small, similar to Ioannis Moskos' rendition. Iefonia was the Sanhedrin priest who tried to disturb the body of the Virgin Mary because the Sanhedrin feared the disappearance of her body and her resurrection. He is touching the funeral bier of the Virgin while the angel stops him.

A red decorative curtain-like cloth with clear lines and folds of fabric with gold trim covers the funeral bier. To our left, behind the miniature altercation, hovering over the Virgin's head using the thymiaterion to incense the body of the holy Virgin Mary is a priest-like figure. The figure is Saint Peter. At her legs, kneeling is Saint Paul. Saint Peter and Saint Paul are pillars of the Church and are commonly depicted in this manner in paintings of the Dormition of Mary.

To the left and right of Jesus are the four bishops dressed in episcopal vestments. Dionysius the Areopagite, Hierotheos the Thesmothete, Saint Timothy and James, brother of Jesus. Two are reading from a sacred book to the right and left of Jesus. Another important figure John the Apostle appears to our right of Jesus between the two bishops, parallel to Saint Paul's head. John the Apostle bows his head in reverence. During the Crucifixion, John the Apostle was instructed to watch over the Virgin Mary for Jesus, and he plays an important role in the works of the Dormition of Mary.

A large crowd is present with many men and women, and most of the apostles were present except Saint Thomas. Christ embraces a small infant within a mandorla surrounded by angels, some holding candles, others thymiaterion. Both the Virgin and Jesus' head are surrounded by a golden halo, along with the celestial infant. The swaddled figure resembling an infant represents the Virgin Mary. Infant Mary symbolizes the Virgin's soul, featuring the purity and rebirth of the soul while it enters heaven, as a newborn child begins new life. In the clouds, eleven apostles reappear six to our left and five to our right. Above the five apostles, Mary reappears on a cloud held up by two angels. Mary hands Doubting Thomas the holy girdle as a testimony to her resurrection and because he missed her dormition. The painter's signature is at the bottom of the work.

== Gallery ==
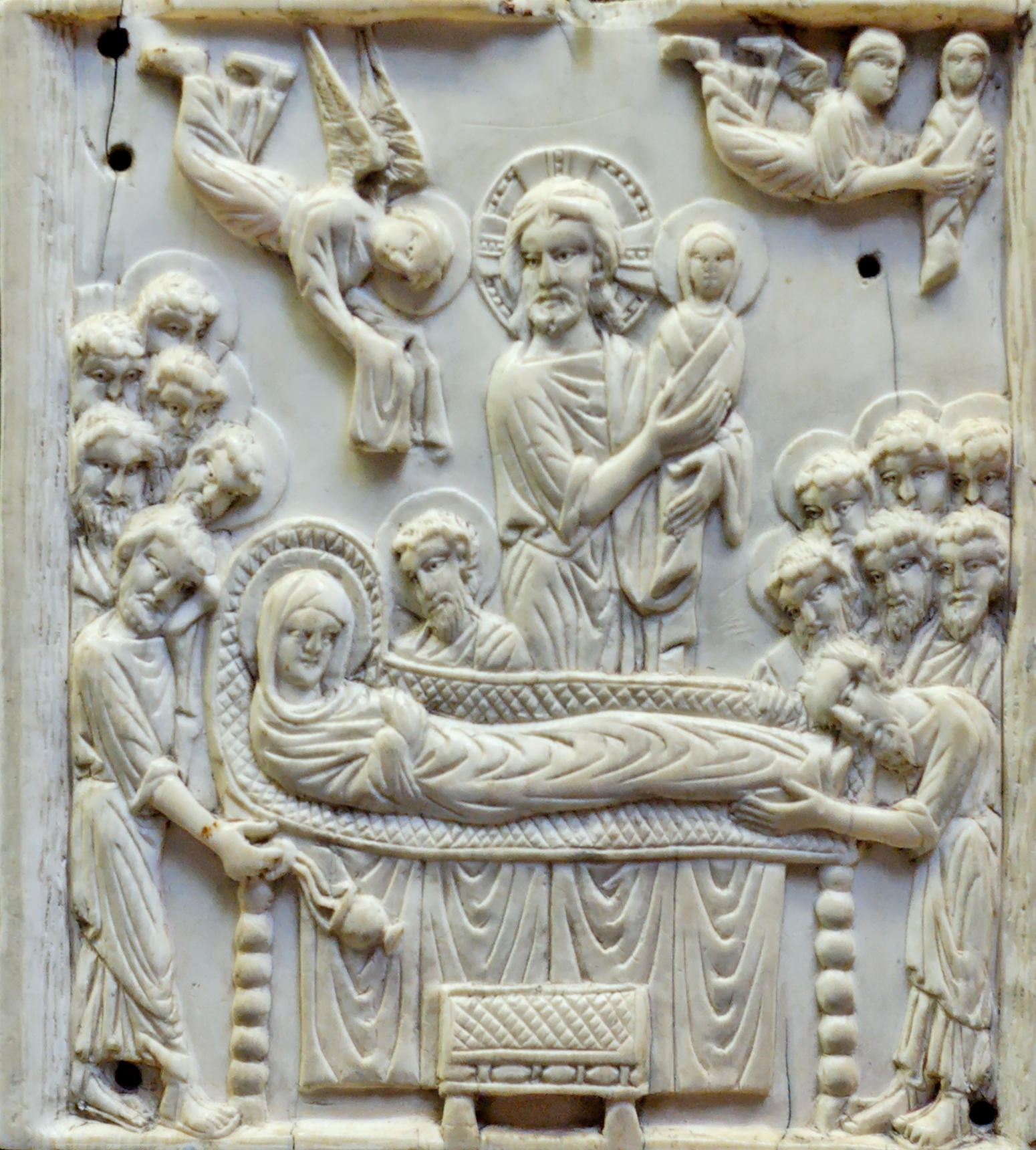
Dormitio Virginis of Constantinople, c. 1000

Dormition of the Theotokos, Mount Sinai, 13th century

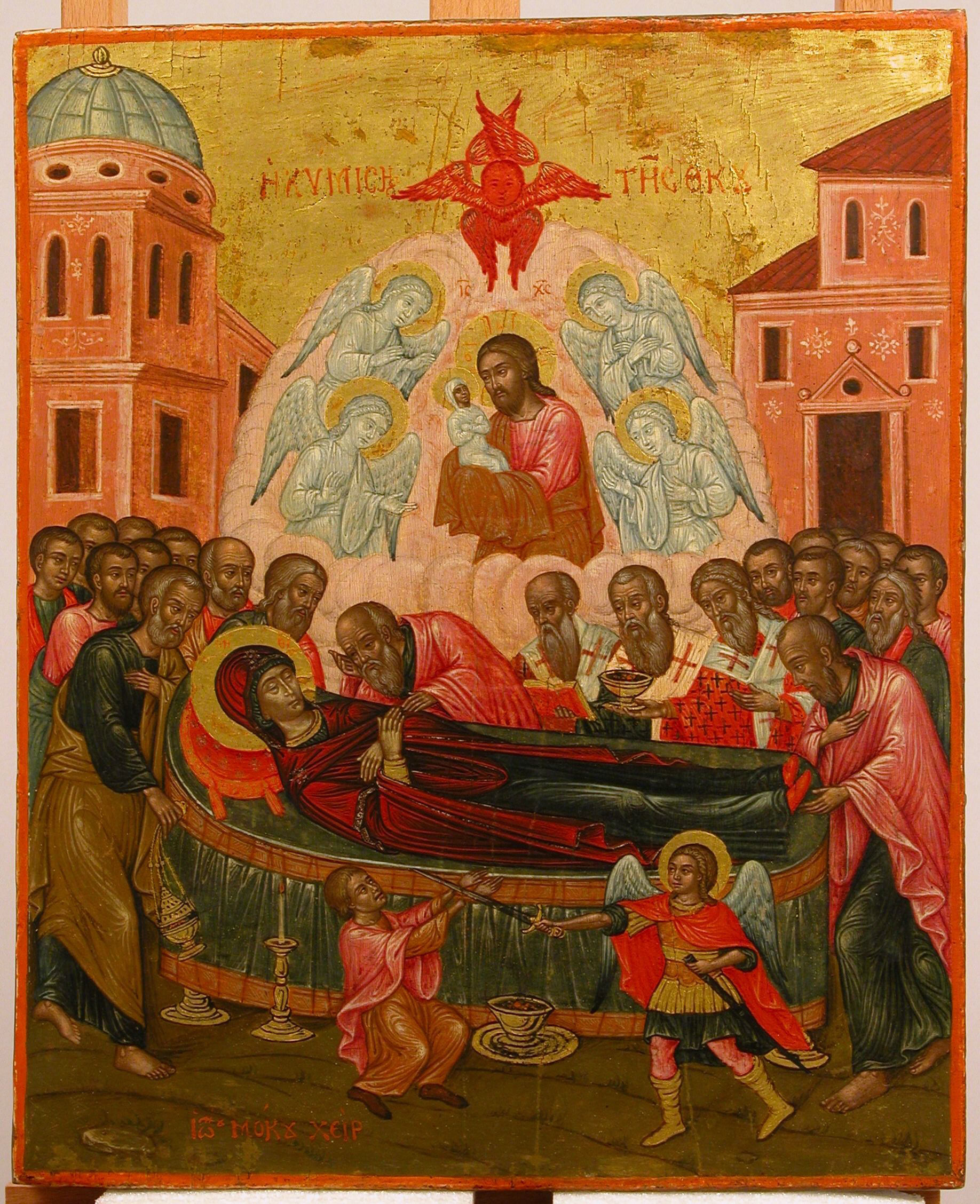
The Dormition of the Virgin by Ioannis Moskos, c. 1650-1721

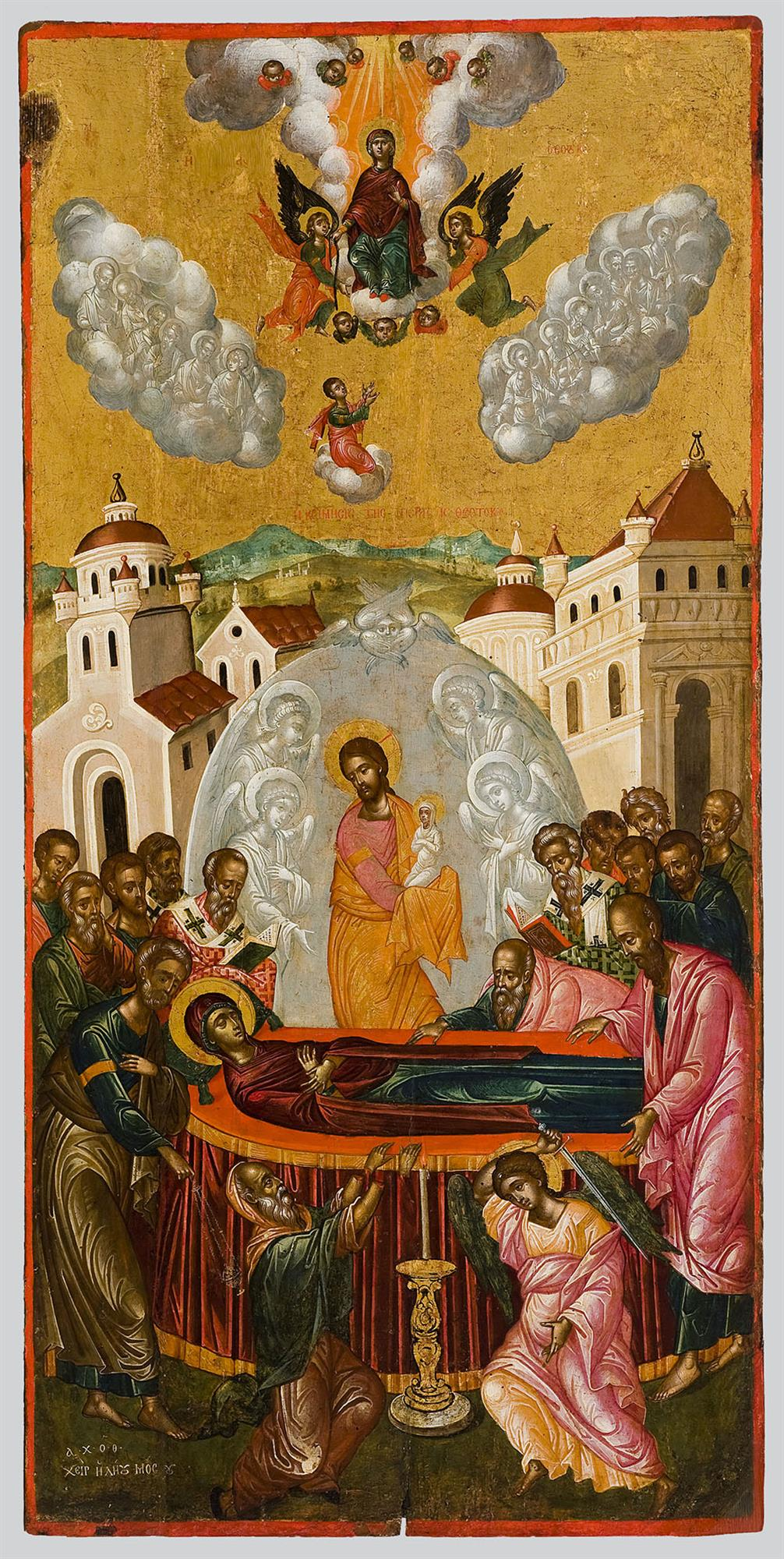
The Dormition and Assumption of the Virgin by Elias Moskos, c. 1679

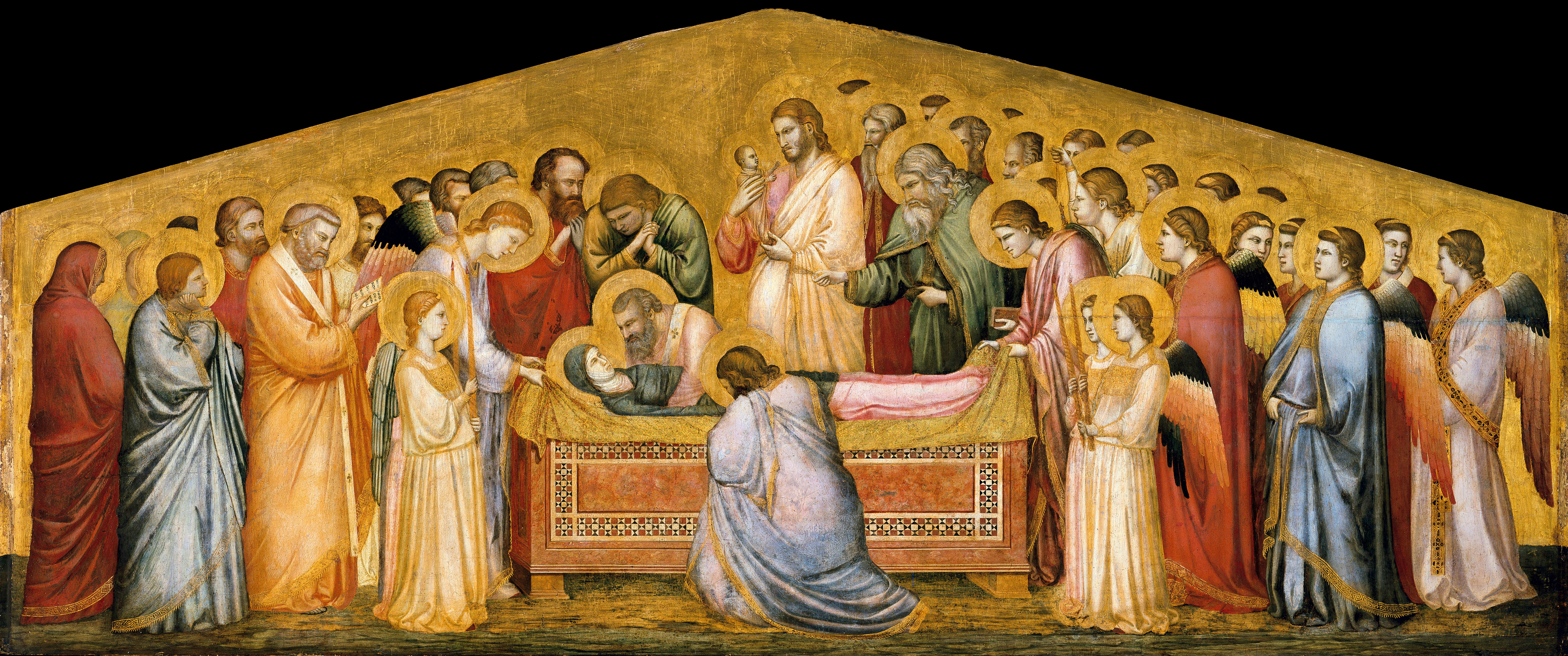
The Entombment of Mary by Giotto, c. 1310

== Bibliography ==
- Hatzidakis, Manolis (1987). Έλληνες Ζωγράφοι μετά την Άλωση (1450–1830). Τόμος 1: Αβέρκιος – Ιωσήφ [Greek Painters after the Fall of Constantinople (1450–1830). Volume 1: Averkios – Iosif]. Athens: Center for Modern Greek Studies, National Research Foundation. hdl:10442/14844. ISBN 960-7916-01-8.
- Achimastou-Potamianou, Myrtali (1988). "Η Κοίμηση της Θεοτόκου σε δύο Κρητικές Εικόνες της Κω" [Τhe Dormition of the Virgin in two Cretan Icons from Kos.]. Deltion of the Christian Archaeological Society. XAE 13 (Delta): 125–156. doi:10.12681/dchae.986.
- Kitzinger, Ernst (1990). The Mosaics of St. Marys of the Admiral in Palermo. Washington: Dumbarton Oaks. ISBN 9780884021797.
- Agrigoroaei, Vladimir (2022). The Culture of Latin Greece Seven Tales from the 13th and 14th Centuries. Leiden, NL: Brill. ISBN 9789004524224.
- Lacey, Joann (2021). History of Art and Architecture: Volume One. Bergland, MI: Sugar Creek.
- Crowe, Joseph Archer; Cavalcaselle, Giovanni Battista (1903). A History of Painting in Italy: Giotto and the Giottesques. New York, NY: Charles Scribner's Sons.
