= Christ the Vine =

Christ the Vine may refer to:

- Christ the Vine (Moskos), a tempera painting by Leos Moskos
- Christ the Vine (Victor), an egg tempera painting by Victor
