= Christ the Vine (Angelo) =

Painting by Angelos Akotantos

- Ο Χριστός η Άμπελος (Greek), Cristo Vera Vite (Italian)
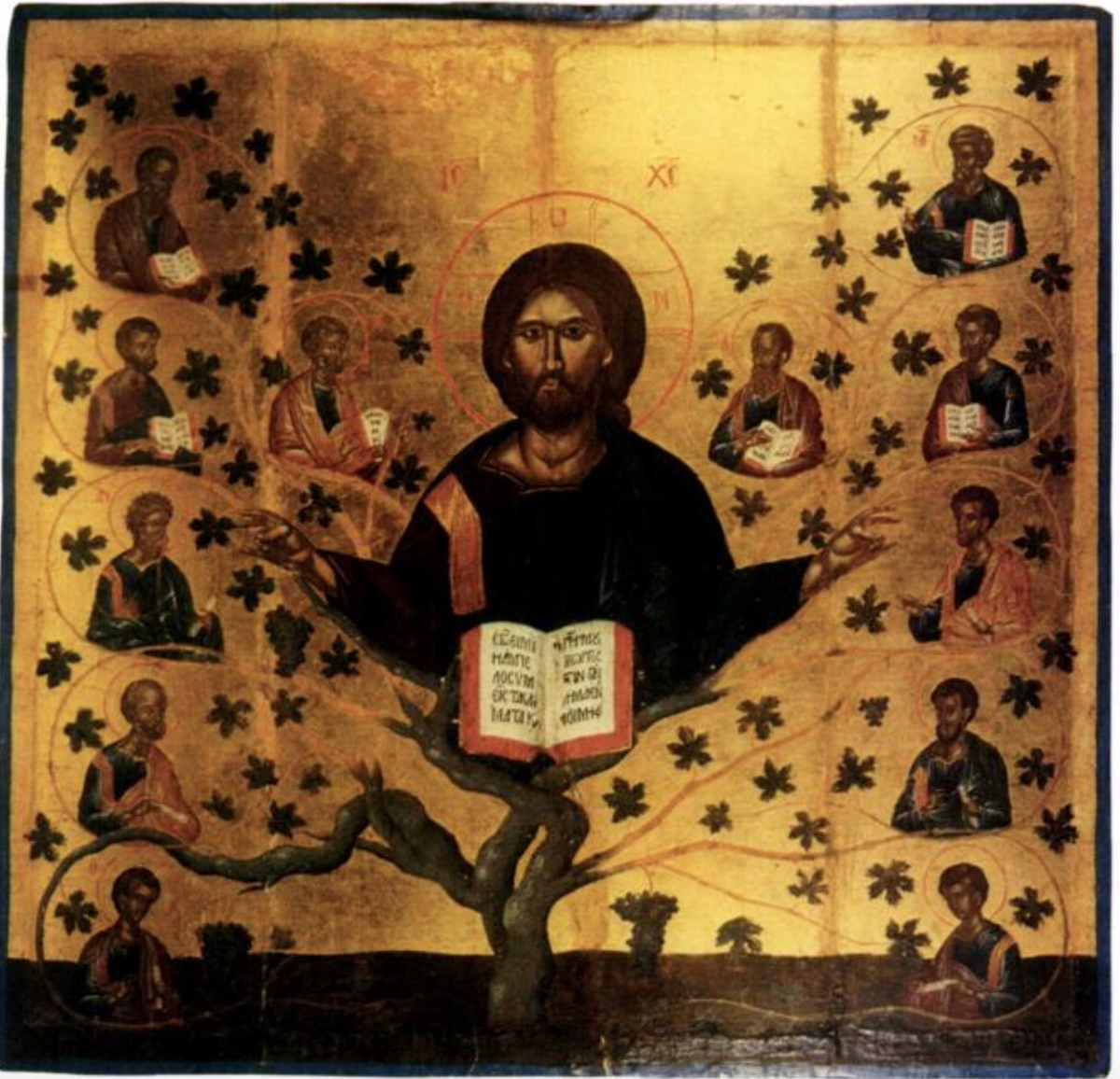
- Artist: Angelos Akotantos
- Year: c. 1425 - 1457
- Medium: tempera on wood
- Movement: Cretan School
- Subject: Jesus Christ, nine original apostles with Paul the Evangelist, Luke the Evangelist and Mark the Evangelist
- Dimensions: 77 cm × 79 cm (30.3 in × 31.1 in)
- Location: Monastery of the Virgin Hodegetria, Heraklion, Crete
- Owner: Monastery of the Virgin Hodegetria

Christ the Vine is a tempera painting created by Greek painter Angelos. Angelos was active from 1425 to 1457. He was a teacher and protopsaltis (first chanter). His students included some of the most famous painters of the early Cretan Renaissance. Andreas Pavias and Andreas Ritzos were his students and were heavily influenced by his style. Forty-nine of his works survived. Angelo’s Christ the Vine was one of his most important works.

Christ the Vine features twelve figures from the new testament. The work commemorates the evangelists and their important work. Paul the Evangelist, Luke the Evangelist, and Mark the Evangelist are the most important figures on the vine because they were not members of the twelve original apostles. The evangelists were equally important within ecclesiastical circles. This work reflects the significance of the historical figures. His followers during the Apostolic Age are often referred to as the evdomikonta (εβδομήκοντα). People often assume because there are twelve figures on the vine surrounding Christ that the original apostles were represented.

Christ the Vine is associated with the parable or allegory of the True Vine. It is referenced heavily in John 15:1–17. Jesus refers to his followers as branches of himself. The work is a pictorial representation of the parable of the True Vine. The theme was copied by countless painters. Angelo’s paintings were the earliest versions. They are the most important paintings of the early Cretan Renaissance. Three versions exist all three are in Heraklion one is at the Vrontisi Monastery in Heraklion. The second portable icon is located at Iera Moni Panagias Exakoustis, Ierapetra, Crete close to Malles. This version is signed by the artist. It is located at the Monastery of the Virgin Hodegetria, in Heraklion, Crete.

== Description ==
Christ the Vine is a painting made of egg tempera paint and gold leaf on a wood panel. The height is 77 cm (30.3 in) and the width is 79 cm (31.1 in). The work was completed sometime between 1425 and 1457 in Crete. Twelve figures exist but they are not the original twelve apostles. Peter sits with an open book to our left at the highest point in the tree. Across from Peter to our right Paul the Evangelist appears. Distinct red halos surrounded all the figures. The majestic angelic figures are weightless in a spaceless setting. Jesus appears in the center as part of the sacred tree. He is nearly half the height of the icon. Seven books are open. The divine figure of Christ Pantokrator is painted in the traditional Italian-Greek Byzantine style. The colors of his garment are the typical red and blue colors. The flesh tones feature a shading technique. The central figure exhibits the typical ecclesiastical hand gesture.

The group of two figures to the left and right of Jesus are from left to right: Mark the Evangelist, John the Evangelist, Matthew the Evangelist and Luke the Evangelist. Many Cretan artists depicted the four evangelists as symbols. Six original apostles appear below the group with open books. Thaddeus or Jude is to our left directly below Saint Mark and John the Evangelist. On the right, in the same row James is seated on a branch. The next row of apostles left to right are Simon and Bartholomew. The two figures face each other. The final two apostles at the lowest point in the tree from left to right are Thomas and Philip. The final two are closest to the ground.

The gilded background is still in good condition. Some of the branches have deteriorated but leaves and grapes are visible. The image clearly demonstrates the flattened space of the Italian-Greek Byzantine style. The painting is over five hundred years old. Angelo's work was copied by numerous artists both Greek and Italian. Notable versions were finished by Leos Moskos and Victor. Both artists added new symbols to the iconic painting. In Leos Moskos's version of Christ the Vine, Saint Peter holds the Keys of Heaven in his left hand. Victor added God himself, and the white dove to his version of Christ the Vine.

== Gallery ==
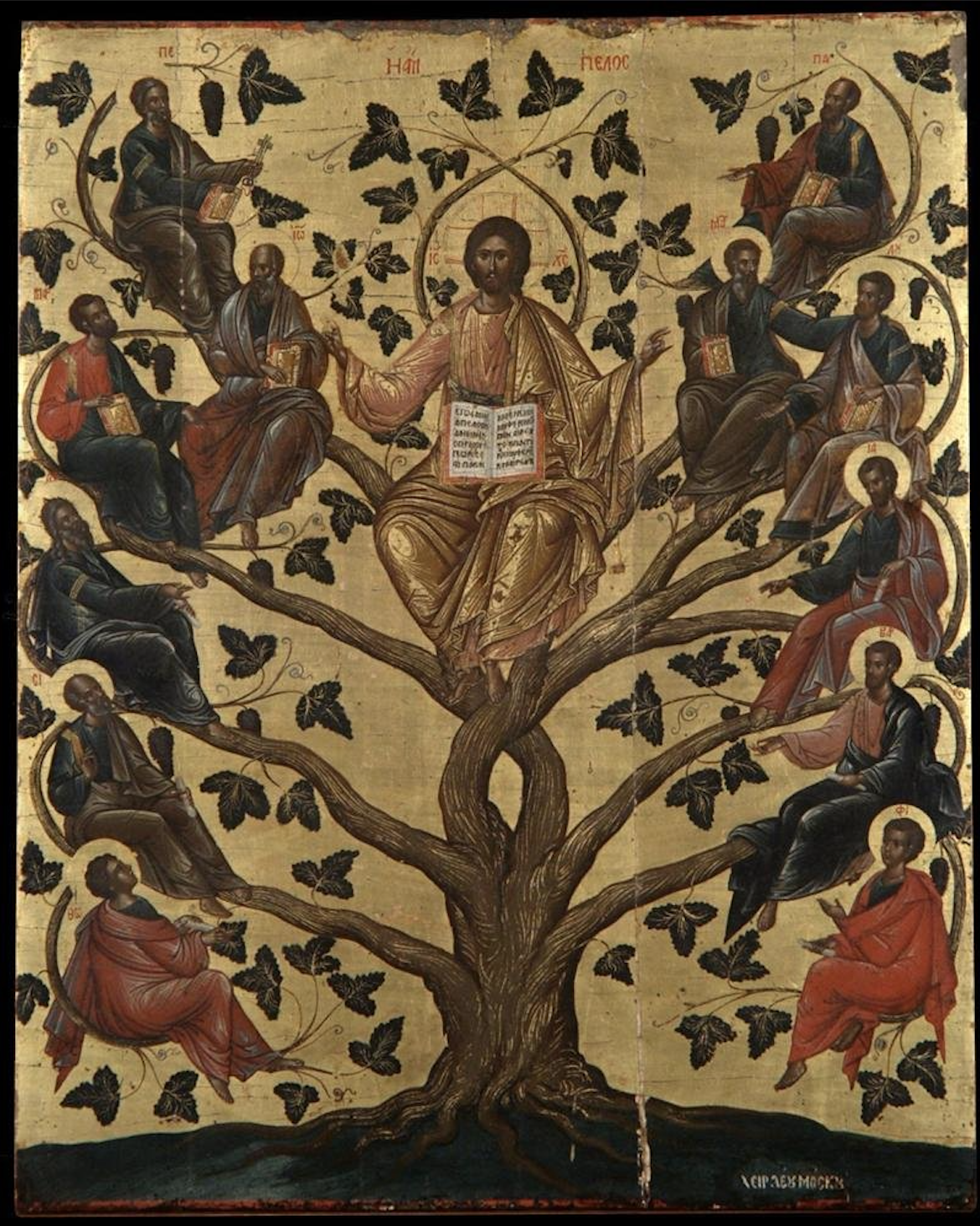
Christ the Vine Leos Moskos

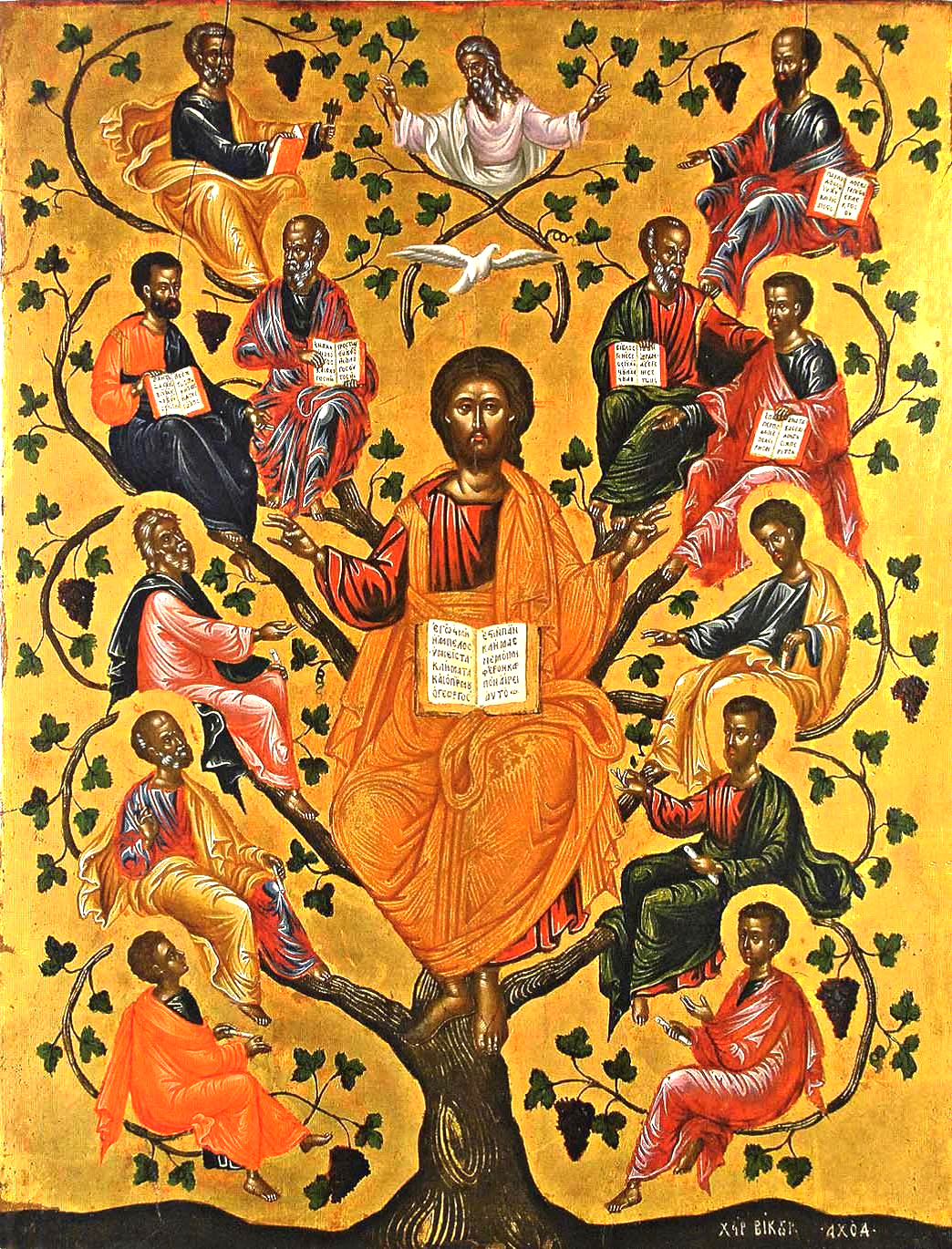
Christ the Vine (1674) Victor

== See also ==
- True Vine
