= True Vine =

Biblical term of Jesus

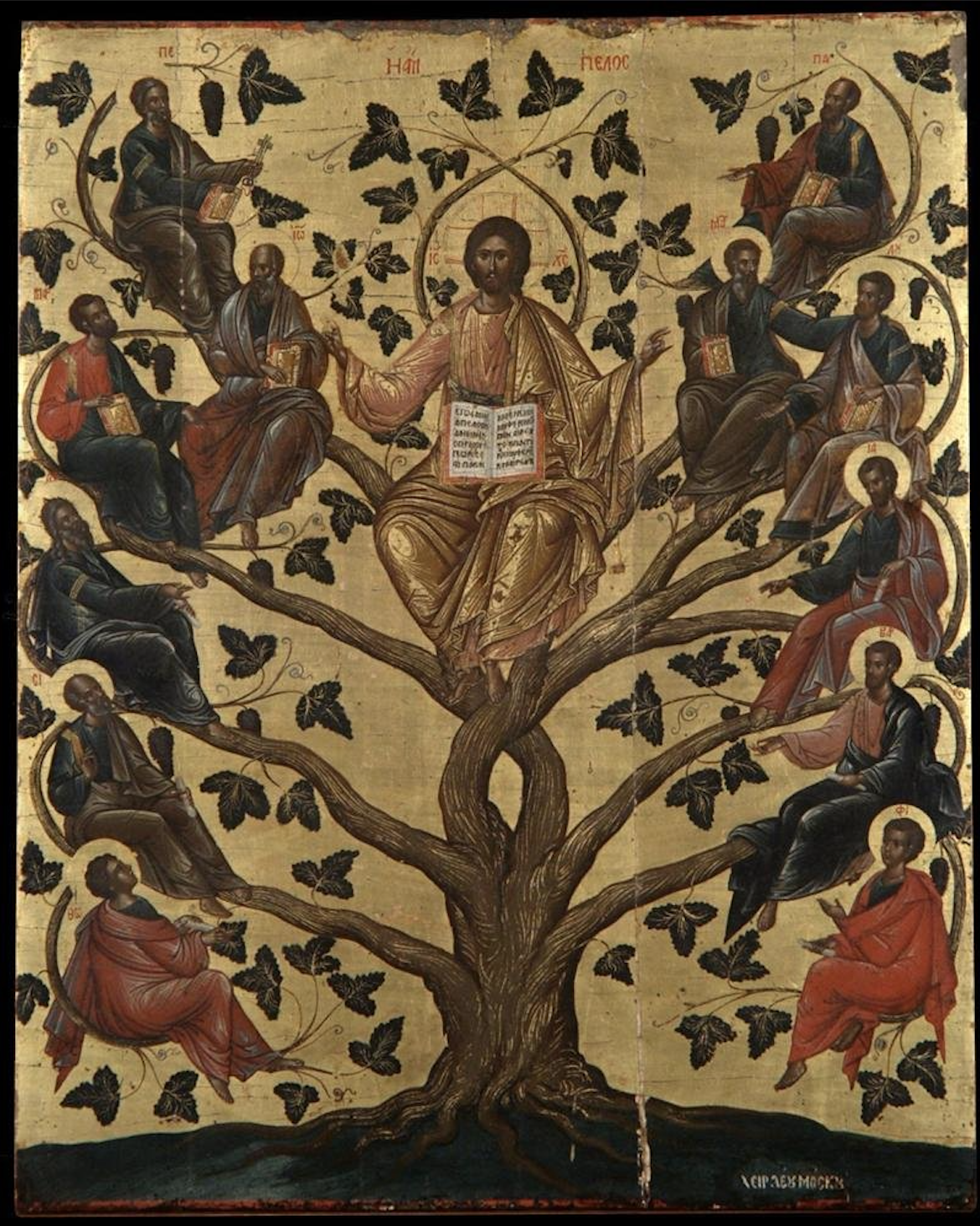
Christ the True Vine, 17th century Greek painting by Leos Moskos

The True Vine (Greek: ἡ ἄμπελος ἡ ἀληθινή hē ampelos hē alēthinē) is an allegory or parable given by Jesus in the New Testament. Found in John 15:1–17, it describes Jesus' disciples as branches of himself, who is described as the "true vine", and God the Father the "husbandman".

== Old Testament ==
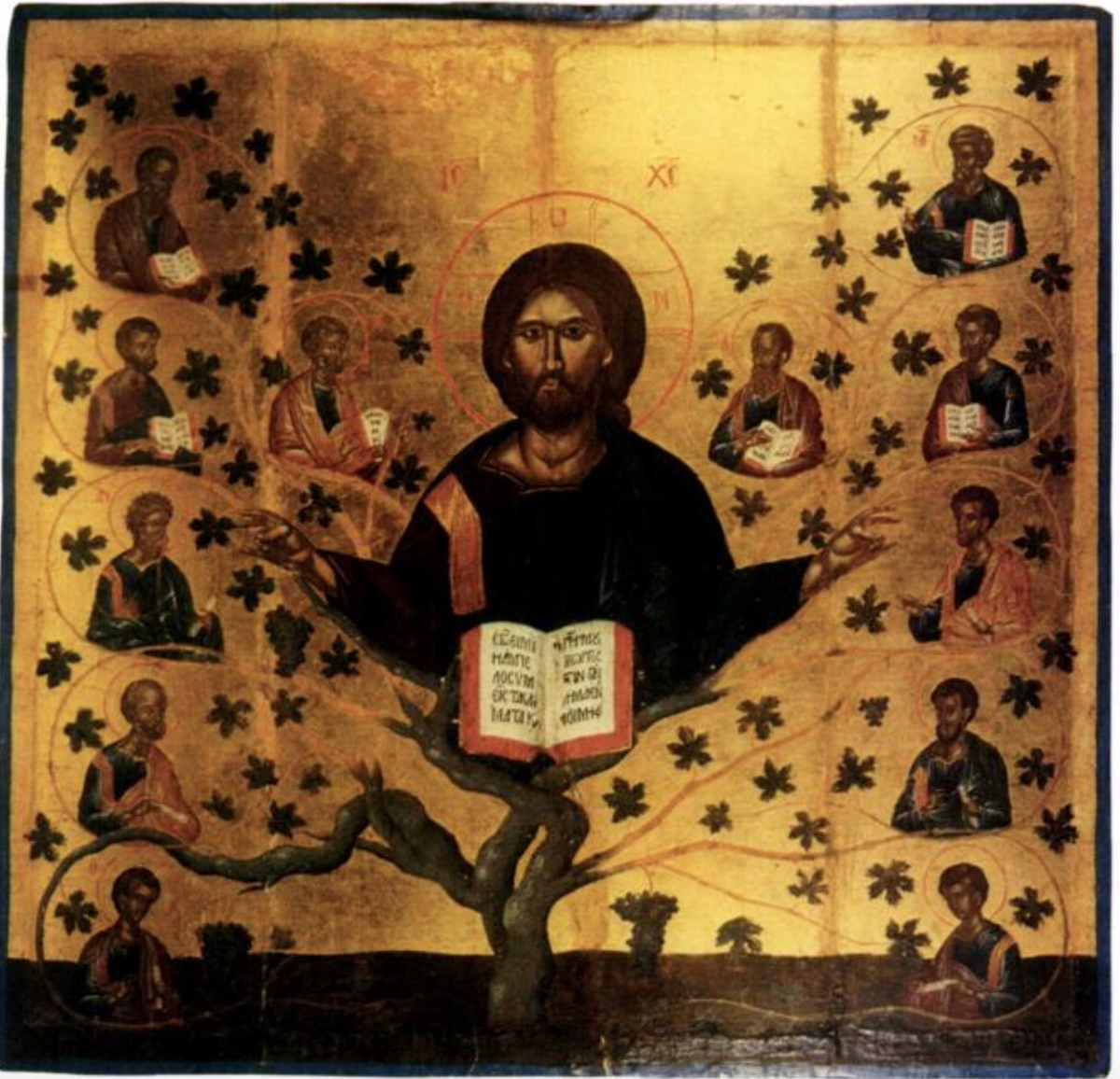
Christ the Vine by Angelos Akotantos completed between 1425 - 1457

There are numerous Old Testament passages which refer to the people of Israel as a vine (Hebrew: גָּ֫פֶן gephen): Psalm 80:8–16, Isaiah 5:1–7, Jeremiah 2:21, Ezekiel 15:1–8, 17:5–10, and 19:10–14, and Hosea 10:1. The Old Testament passages which use this symbolism appear to regard Israel as faithful to God and/or the object of severe punishment.

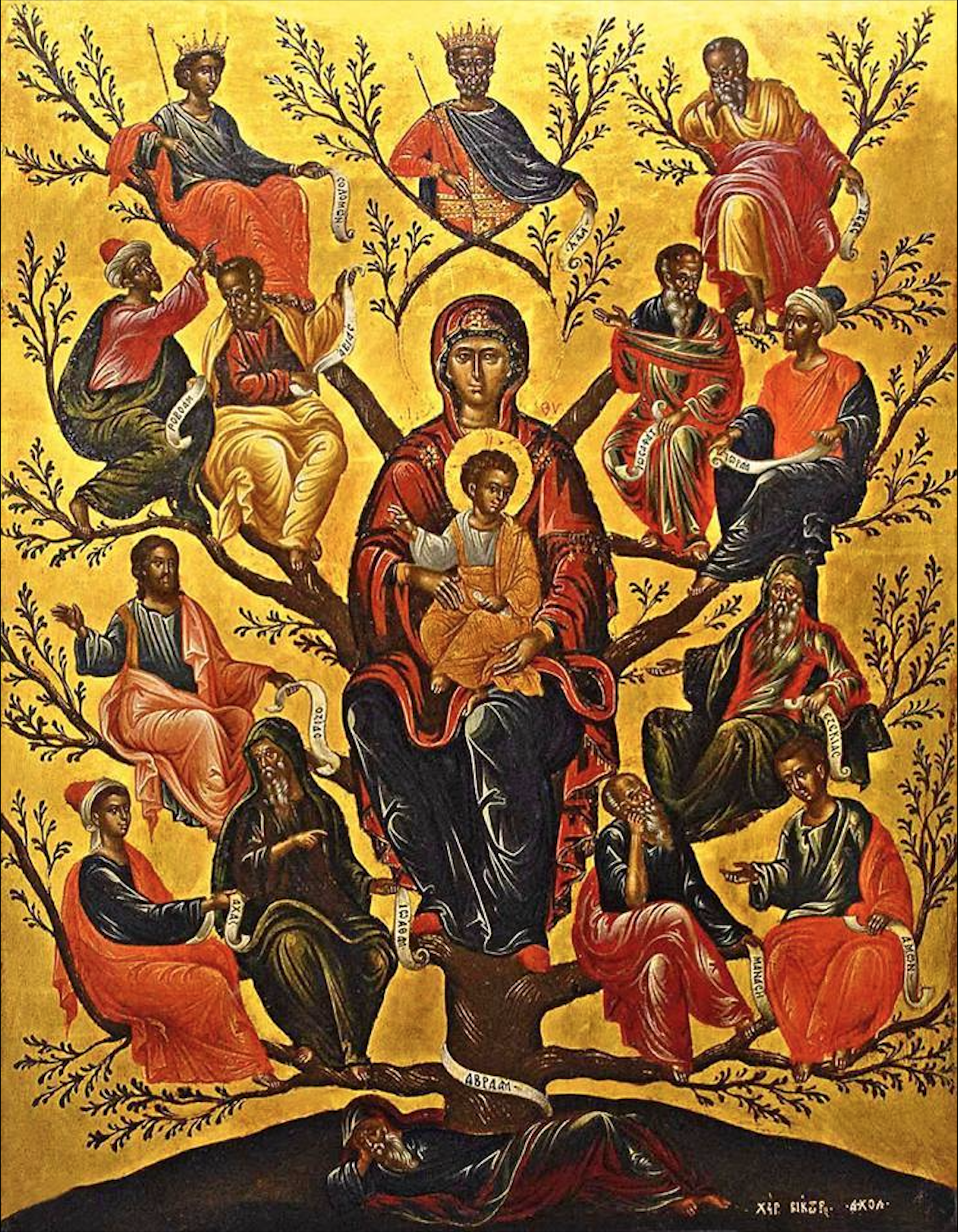
Tree of Jesse by Victor, 1674

Ezek 17:5–10 contains vine imagery which refers to a king of the house of David, Zedekiah, who was set up as king in Judah by Nebuchadnezzar. Christians link the theme to the Tree of life and the Tree of Jesse. The Tree of Jesse originates in a passage in the biblical Book of Isaiah. The book metaphorically describes the Tree of Jesse in a passage and references the descent of the Messiah and is accepted by Christians as referring to Jesus. The various figures depicted in the lineage of Jesus are drawn from those names listed in the Gospel of Matthew and the Gospel of Luke. Sometimes the Virgin Mary is also depicted in a vine.

== Cretan School ==
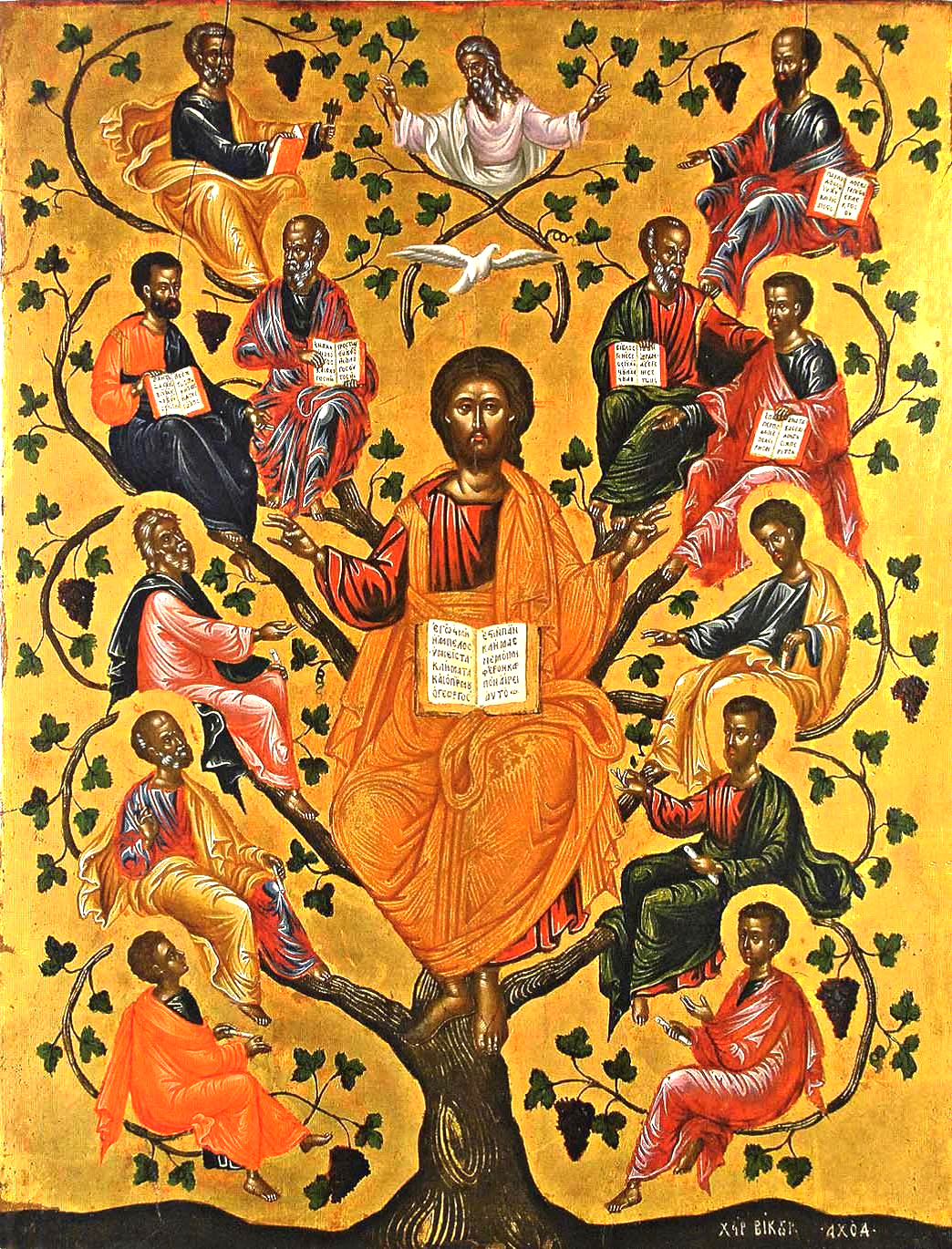
Christ the Vine by Victor, 1674

The True Vine was a popular theme painted by Cretan artists. One of the earliest painters of the theme was Angelos Akotantos. Angelos painted several versions of the work during the 15th century. One of Angelo's paintings of the True Vine entitled Christ the Vine is located at the Monastery of the Virgin Hodegetria, Heraklion, Crete. The theme was copied by many artists and Christ the Vine or Christos o Ambelos is a depiction of the nine original apostles with Paul the Evangelist sometimes referred to as the thirteenth Apostle, Luke the Evangelist and Mark the Evangelist on a tree. The theme is linked to the Tree of Jesse which is the original use of the family tree as a schematic representation of a genealogy. The theme originated in a passage from the biblical Book of Isaiah and describes the descent of the Messiah. The tree is the depiction in art of the ancestors of Jesus Christ and Christ is shown in a branching tree. The tree typically rises from Jesse of Bethlehem, Jesse was the father of King David. The Tree of Jesse (Ρίζα του Ιεσσαί) has appeared numerous times in Greek Italian Byzantine art and the True Vine theme is also part of the New Testament. It is a parable or allegory found in John 15:1–17. It describes Jesus's disciples as branches of himself. Leos Moskos completed his version of the work between 1650-1690 and it is entitled Christ the Vine. Victor completed his version of the Christ the Vine in 1674.

== Interpretation as parable ==
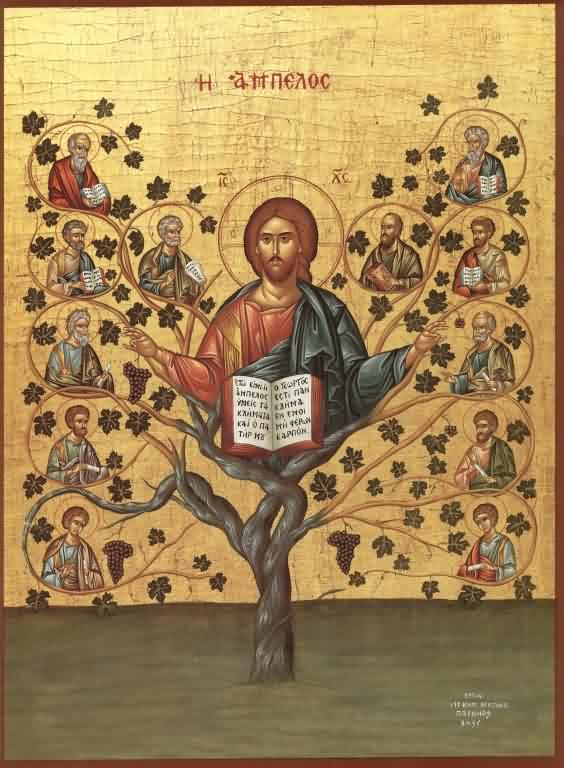
Icon of Christ as the true Vine

Several authors such as Barbara Reid, Arland Hultgren or Donald Griggs comment that "parables are noticeably absent from the Gospel of John". According to the Catholic Encyclopedia, "There are no parables in St. John's Gospel"; and according to the Encyclopædia Britannica, "Here Jesus' teaching contains no parables and but three allegories, the Synoptists present it as parabolic through and through." These sources all suggest that the passage is better described as a metaphor than a parable. Some writers, however, notably John Calvin, referred to the passage by a Latin term that is typically translated into English as a "parable".

== Text ==
John 15:1–17 in the Douay–Rheims Bible:

I am the true vine; and my Father is the husbandman. Every branch in me, that beareth not fruit, he will take away: and every one that beareth fruit, he will purge it, that it may bring forth more fruit. Now you are clean by reason of the word, which I have spoken to you. Abide in me, and I in you. As the branch cannot bear fruit of itself, unless it abide in the vine, so neither can you, unless you abide in me. I am the vine: you the branches: he that abideth in me, and I in him, the same beareth much fruit: for without me you can do nothing. If any one abide not in me, he shall be cast forth as a branch, and shall wither, and they shall gather him up, and cast him into the fire, and he burneth. If you abide in me, and my words abide in you, you shall ask whatever you will, and it shall be done unto you. In this is my Father glorified; that you bring forth very much fruit, and become my disciples. As the Father hath loved me, I also have loved you. Abide in my love. If you keep my commandments, you shall abide in my love; as I also have kept my Father's commandments, and do abide in his love. These things I have spoken to you, that my joy may be in you, and your joy may be filled. This is my commandment, that you love one another, as I have loved you. Greater love than this no man hath, that a man lay down his life for his friends. You are my friends, if you do the things that I command you. I will not now call you servants: for the servant knoweth not what his lord doth. But I have called you friends: because all things whatsoever I have heard of my Father, I have made known to you. You have not chosen me: but I have chosen you; and have appointed you, that you should go, and should bring forth fruit; and your fruit should remain: that whatsoever you shall ask of the Father in my name, he may give it you. These things I command you, that you love one another.

== See also ==
- Christifideles laici
- I am (biblical term)
- Fruit of the Holy Spirit
- The Tree and its Fruits
- Gufna, heavenly grapevine in Mandaeism

== Bibliography ==
- Bladen, Victoria (2021). The Tree of Life and Arboreal Aesthetics in Early Modern Literature. New York, NY: Taylor & Francis. ISBN 9781000454819.
