= The Nativity (Victor) =

Egg tempera painting by Victor, 1660–1676

- Γέννησις του Ιησού Χριστού (Greek), La Natività (Italian)
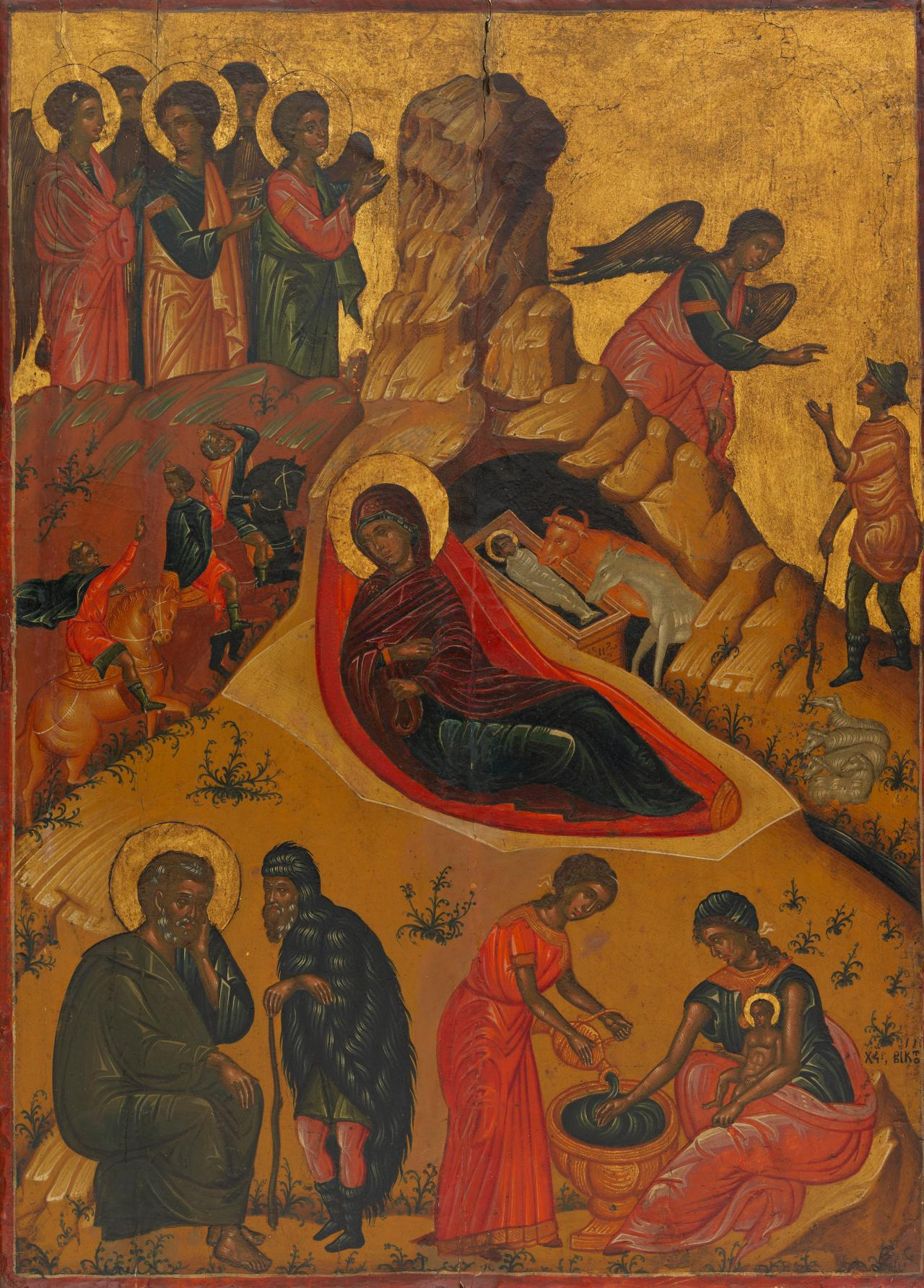
- Artist: Victor
- Year: 1660–1676
- Medium: tempera on wood
- Subject: Nativity of Jesus
- Dimensions: 56.6 cm × 40.8 cm (22.3 in × 16.1 in)
- Location: National Gallery of Victoria, Melbourne, Australia
- Owner: National Gallery of Victoria
- Accession: 1980-4
- Website: Official Website

The Nativity is an egg tempera painting by Victor. Victor is sometimes referred to as Victor of Crete. Victor was active from 1645 to 1696. He traveled all over the Venetian empire. He settled in Zakinthos. Some of his important works can be found in the church San Giorgio dei Greci in Venice. He is a very important Greek painter because of his existing catalog. His works of art exceed ninety-five paintings. One of his notable works was his version of Christ the Vine.

The Nativity is one of the most important symbols of Christianity. The subject has been depicted countless times by both Greek and Italian artists since the inception of the new religion. Proto-Renaissance paintings and Cretan art share common characteristics. Greek painters continued painting in the traditional Greek-Italian Byzantine style. The style became known as the maniera greca. The phrase was coined by art critic and painter Giorgio Vasari. He wrote the famous book the Lives of the Most Excellent Painters, Sculptors, and Architects. It was one of the first post-classical European terms for style in art.

By the 1500s both Greek and Italian patrons preferred the manner to the Italian Renaissance style because they desired traditional art. Greek painting workshops in Crete mass-produced different versions of icons in the style. Some artists signed their work and added their own unique characteristics. Victor's nativity is a mixture of the traditional style and Venetian painting. Duccio completed a similar work. Greek painter Konstantinos Tzanes also created a similar version in the same style. An unknown Cretan painter completed a mixed version of the work sometime in the 1500s. One of the most prolific painters of the Cretan School Michael Damaskinos also created a more modern complex version of the subject known as the Adoration of the Kings. The Nativity by Victor is part of the collection of the National Gallery of Victoria in Australia.

== History ==
The work of art consists of tempera and gold leaf. It follows the traditional Greek Italian Byzantine manner. The height is 22.3 in (56.6 cm) and the width is 16.1 in (40.8 cm). The work was completed sometime in the late 17th century possibly on the island of Zakynthos. The work is part of the Late Cretan School. Victor followed the traditional lines frequently used by Proto-Renaissance painters. Countless patrons preferred the style. The Madonna follows the traditional Greek Byzantine style it shares similar characteristics with Duccio's masterpiece. A shepherd visits Joseph in the lower left-hand corner of the work. He is troubled because his child was born in a barn. A maiden to the right of the Joseph figure is cleaning Jesus near a bucket full of water. In the center of the work, the Virgin Mary is painted following the lines of the Greek-Italian traditional Byzantine style. The painter employs complex lines and shading to visually portray her heavenly robe. The Virgin looks away from the viewers as if she is troubled. An ox and donkey greet the Christ Child. An angel instructs one of the shepherds in the background. To our left, a cavalry of wealthy Magi are approaching to give gifts to the worried holy couple. The painter attempts to create a multidimensional landscape. The work of art is filled with animals and vegetation and a superlative mountainous environment. An unknown Cretan painter sometime in the 16th century created a similar work and added a more complex landscape but preserved the heavenly figures. Victor's work is an excellent example of traditional Greek Italian Byzantine craftsmanship mixed with Venetian painting.

== Gallery ==
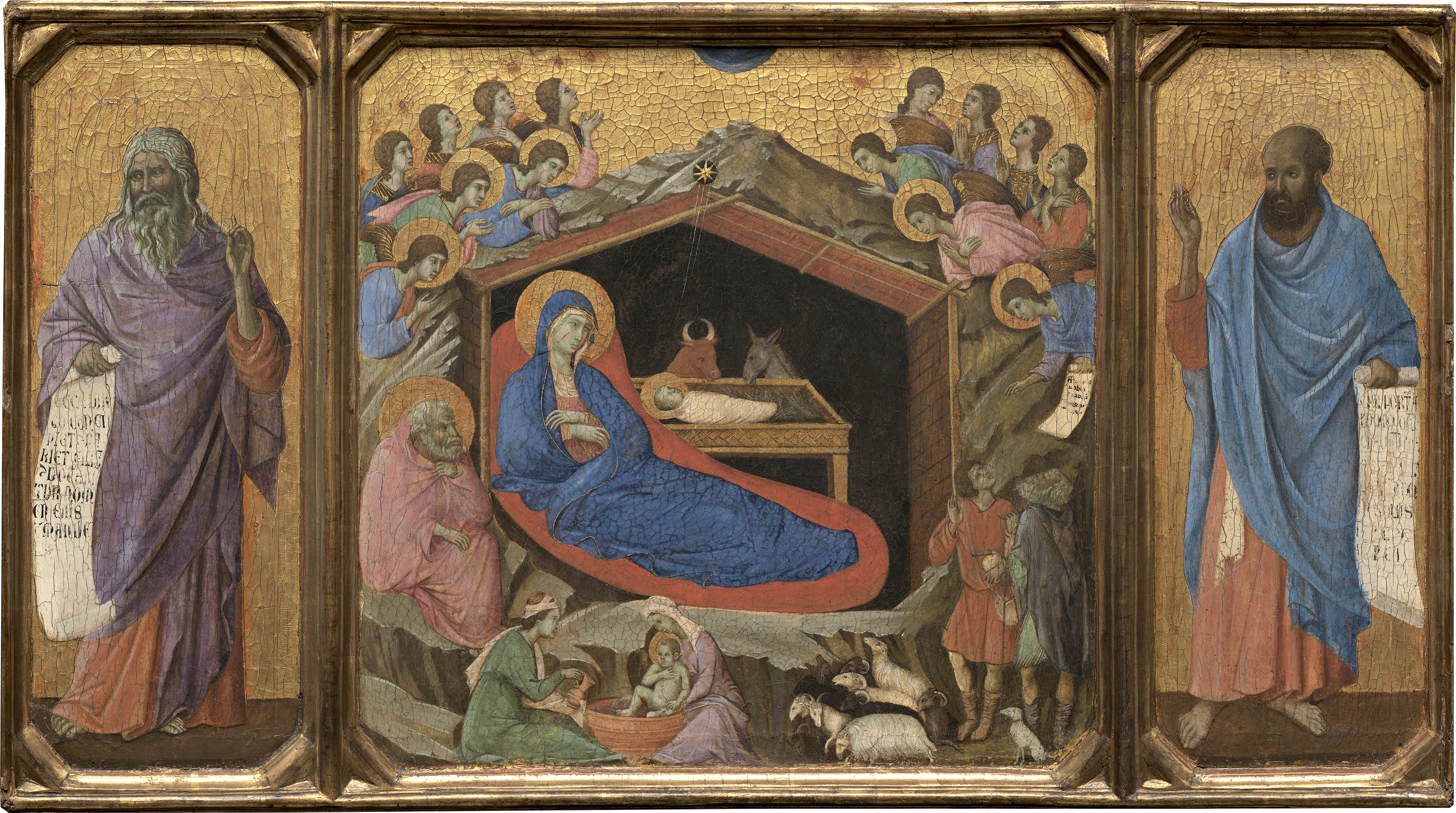
Duccio's Nativity

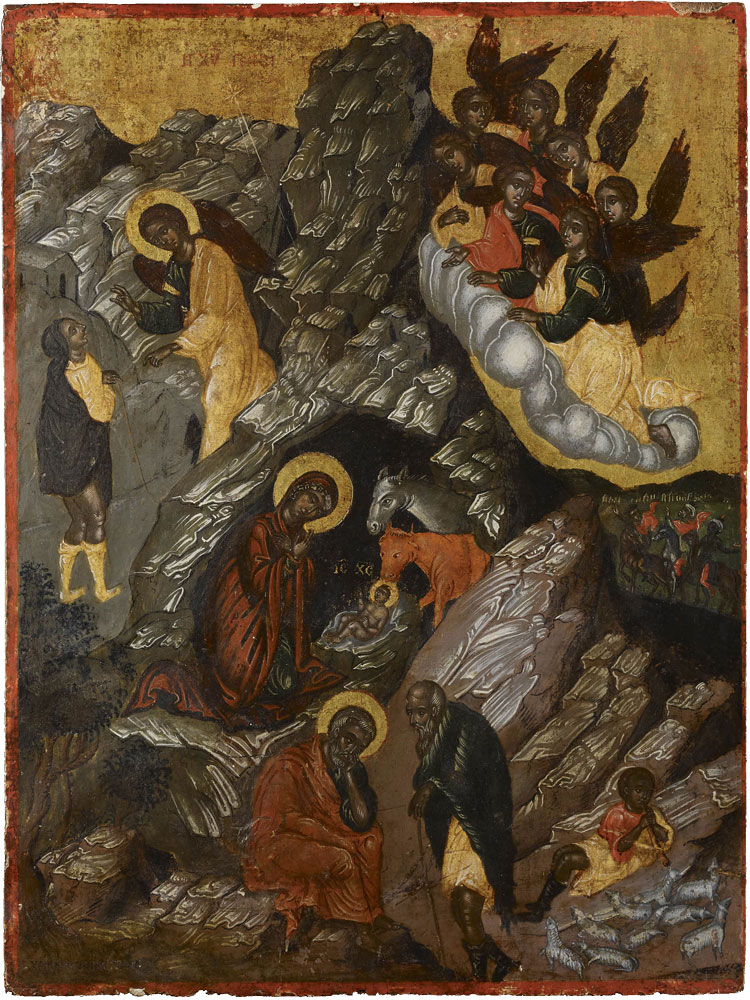
Konstantinos Tzanes's Nativity

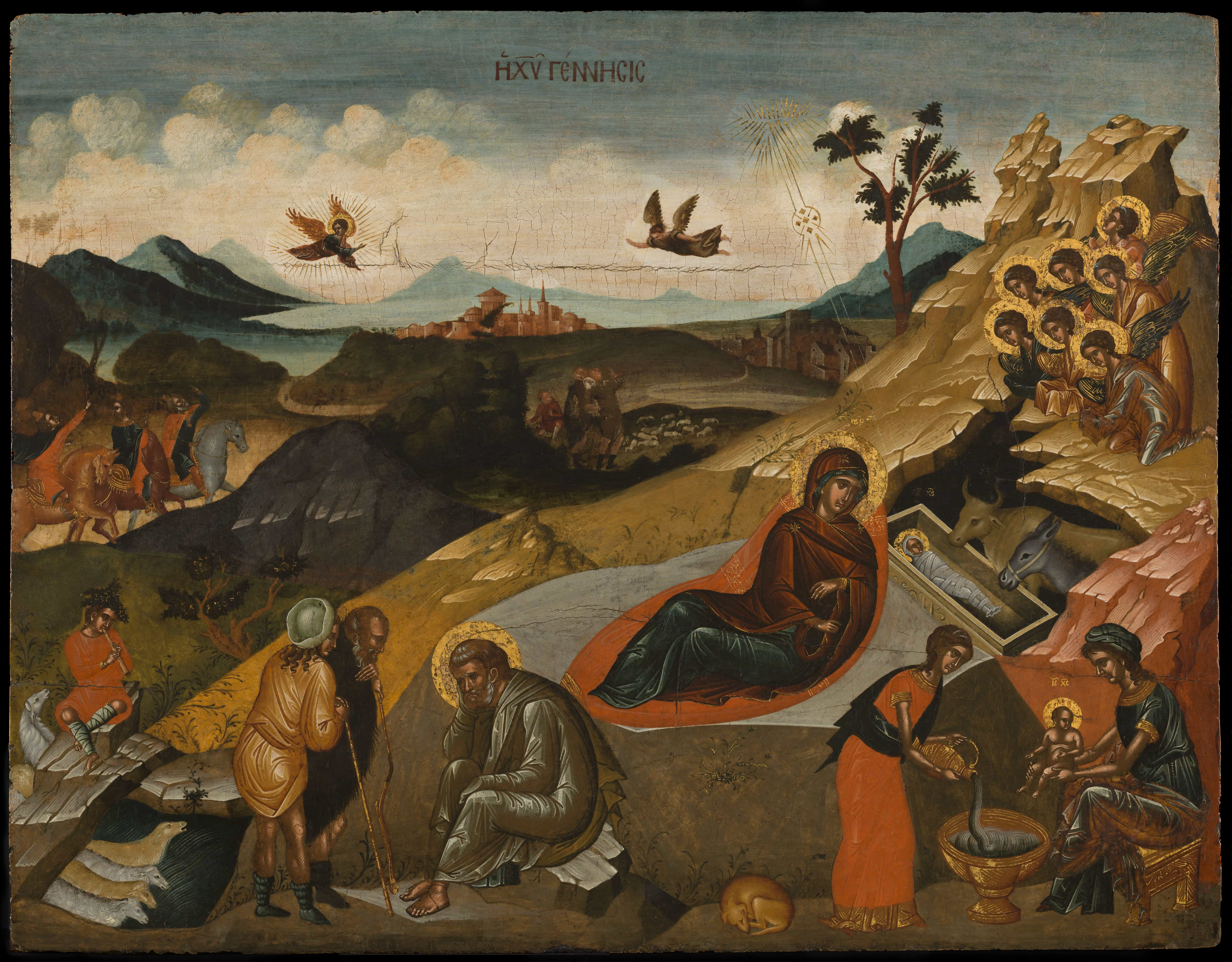
Unknown Painter Nativity (16th century)

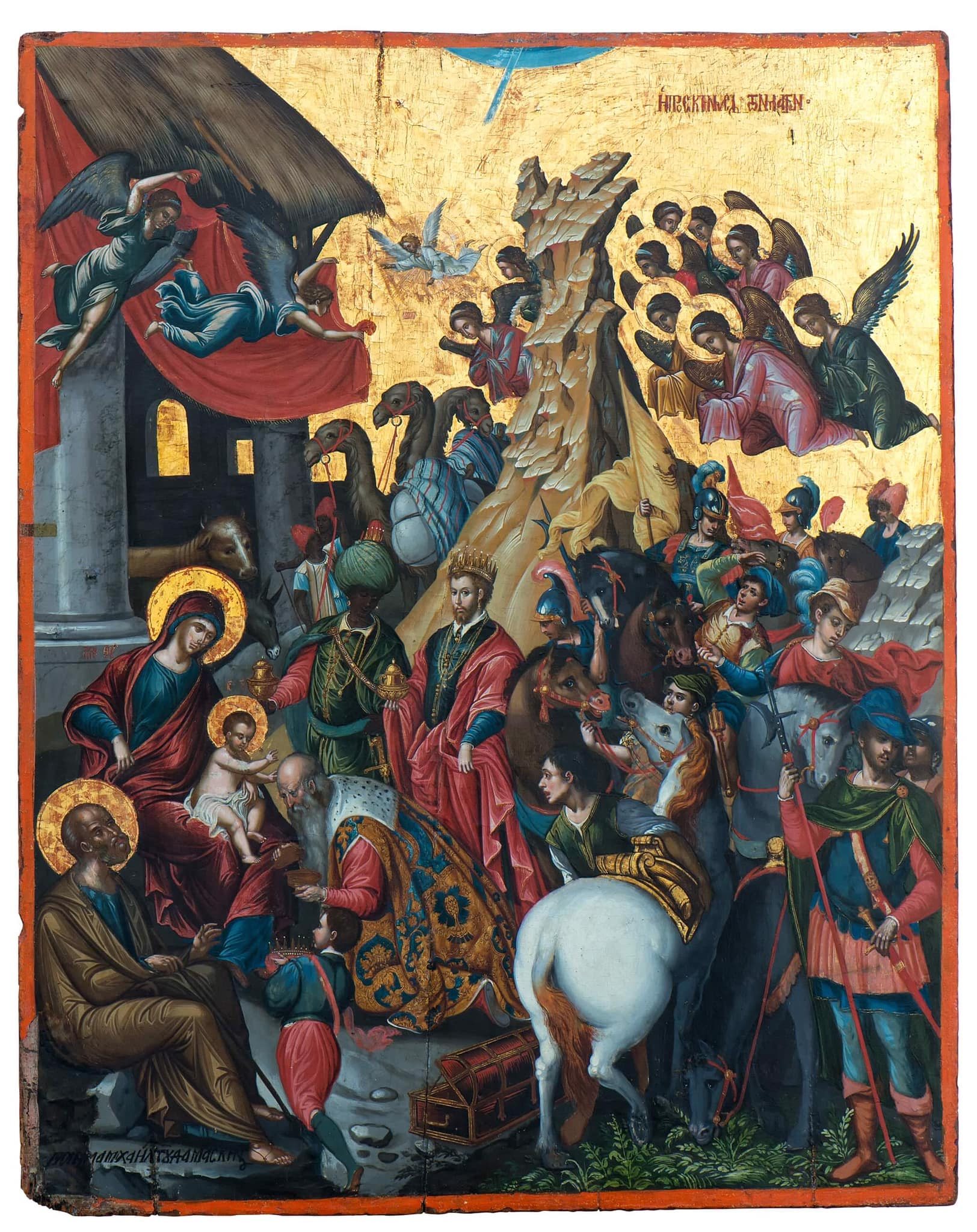
Adoration of the Kings (Damaskinos)

== Bibliography ==
- Hatzidakis, Manolis (1987). Έλληνες Ζωγράφοι μετά την Άλωση (1450–1830). Τόμος 1: Αβέρκιος – Ιωσήφ [Greek Painters after the Fall of Constantinople (1450–1830). Volume 1: Averkios – Iosif]. Athens: Center for Modern Greek Studies, National Research Foundation. hdl:10442/14844. ISBN 960-7916-01-8.
- Drandaki, Anastasia (2014). A Maniera Greca: Content, Context and Transformation of a Term" Studies in Iconography Volume 35. Princeton, New Jersey: Index of Christian Art, Princeton University.
- Tselenti-Papadopoulou, Niki G. (2002). Οι Εικονες της Ελληνικης Αδελφοτητας της Βενετιας απο το 16ο εως το Πρωτο Μισο του 20ου Αιωνα: Αρχειακη Τεκμηριωση [The Icons of the Greek Brotherhood of Venice from 1600 to First Half of the 20th Century]. Athens: Ministry of Culture Publication of the Archaeological Bulletin No. 81. ISBN 960-214-221-9.
