= Christ the Vine (Moskos) =

Painting by Leos Moskos

- Ο Χριστός η Άμπελος (Greek), Cristo Vera Vite (Italian)
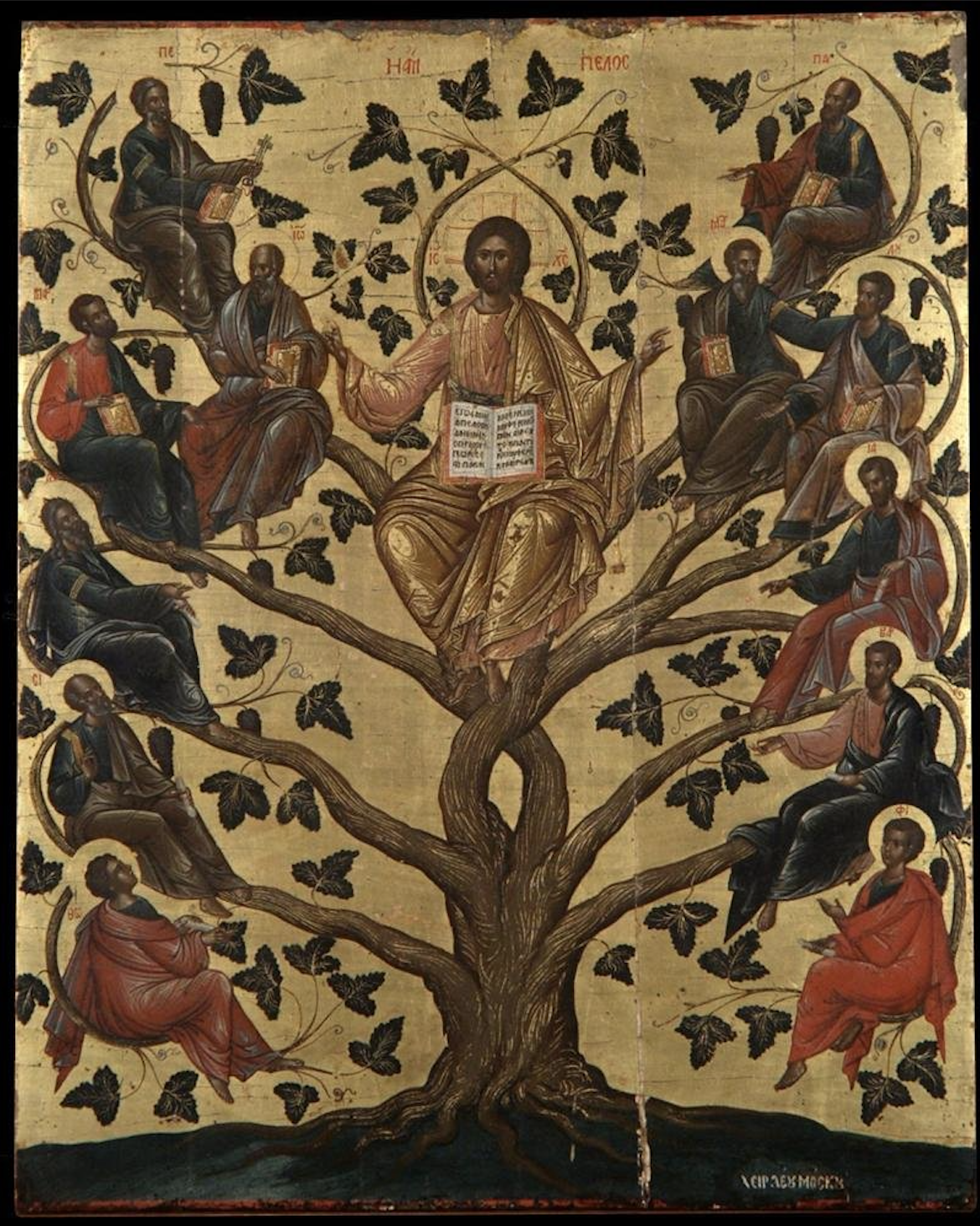
- Artist: Leos Moskos
- Year: c. 1650-1690
- Medium: tempera on wood
- Movement: Late Cretan School
- Subject: Jesus Christ, nine original apostles with Paul the Evangelist, Luke the Evangelist and Mark the Evangelist
- Dimensions: 36.7 cm × 29.3 cm (14.4 in × 11.5 in)
- Location: Benaki Museum, Athens, Greece
- Owner: Benaki Museum
- Website: Official Website

Christ the Vine, also known as the Tree of Christ, is a tempera painting by Leos Moskos. Moskos was active from 1620 to 1690. Twenty of his works have survived. He was originally from Rethimno, Crete. He traveled all over the Venetian empire. He worked on the Ionian islands of Cephalonia and Zakynthos. He also worked in Venice. Two other painters with the same last name were active during the same period. They were Elias Moskos and Ioannis Moskos. All three artists painted in the same style. Leos was in Venice around the same period as Ioannis. There is strong evidence that the three were related. Famous Greek painter and historian Panagiotis Doxaras was Leo’s student.

Christ the Vine was a very popular theme painted by Cretan artists. Angelos Akotantos created three versions of the work during the 15th century. Angelo's Christ the Vine is located at the Monastery of the Virgin Hodegetria, Heraklion, Crete. His theme was copied by many artists. Christ the Vine or Christos o Ambelos is a depiction of the nine original apostles with Paul the Evangelist, Luke the Evangelist and Mark the Evangelist on a tree. The theme can be linked to the Tree of Jesse. The Tree of Jesse is the original use of the family tree as a schematic representation of a genealogy. The theme originated in a passage from the biblical Book of Isaiah. The book describes the descent of the Messiah. The tree is the depiction in art of the ancestors of Jesus Christ. Christ is shown in a branching tree. The tree typically rises from Jesse of Bethlehem, the father of King David. The Tree of Jesse (Ρίζα του Ιεσσαί) has appeared numerous times in Greek Italian Byzantine art. The True Vine theme is also part of the New Testament. It is a parable or allegory found in John 15:1–17. It describes Jesus's disciples as branches of himself. The Moskos version Christ the Vine is an identical copy of a painting in the Byzantine and Christian Museum identified by historians as a mid-16th-century icon created by an unknown artist. The Moskos version is located at the Benaki Museum in Athens, Greece.

== Description ==
Christ the Vine is a tempera painting on gold leaf and wood panel. The height is 36.7 cm (14.4 in) and the width is 29.3 cm (11.5 in). Beginning from the top of the vine to our left, Peter is seated on a branch holding a book and the Keys of Heaven. Saint Peter is often depicted holding the two keys in his left hand. On the other side, across Peter, sits Paul the Evangelist, he also holds a unique book. The two figures are facing each other. Below the top two figures are a group of four figures. They appear to the left and right of Jesus. Jesus takes the stance of Pantocrator. He has a book open in his lap. The book is facing the viewers. The two figures to our left are Saint Mark and John. Three figures were not original apostles. The artist chose evangelists over the original apostles. Saint Mark replaces Judas, Paul the Evangelist replaces Andrew the Apostle and Luke the Evangelist replaces James, son of Alphaeus. Saint Mark was the patron saint of Venice. Across from Saint Mark and John are Matthew and Luke the Evangelist. Matthew is closest to Jesus. Matthew has his arm around Luke the Evangelist they both hold closed books. Below the group of the Four Evangelists, Jude or Thaddeus is to our left directly below Saint Mark and John the Evangelist. Across from Thaddeus below Matthew and Luke. James is seated to our right. He holds a scroll. The next group beginning from our left Simon looks upward while he holds a scroll. He is facing Bartholomew, he also holds a scroll. The final group at the lowest branches of the tree to our left, Thomas looks up at Jesus. Philip sits across from him to our right.

The icon Moskos copied was from an unknown artist created between 1600-1700. It was either wrongfully attributed to a different artist or Moskos created an almost identical version of his own work. The artwork relative to earlier versions of the theme created by Cretan painter Angelos Akotantos displays the same figures. The figures in the later works are more refined adapting to the Venetian influenced maniera greca. The style escaped the Byzantine style introducing a more refined artistic technique. The central figure of Christ is smaller the painter adds more details and lines to the work. The tree and the figures clearly exhibit edges and groves. The folds of fabric are also reminiscent of the refinement in the Cretan style of the period. The three figures to the left and right of Christ create the illusion of space. The different figures are symmetric. The poses of the figures are more complex.

== Gallery ==
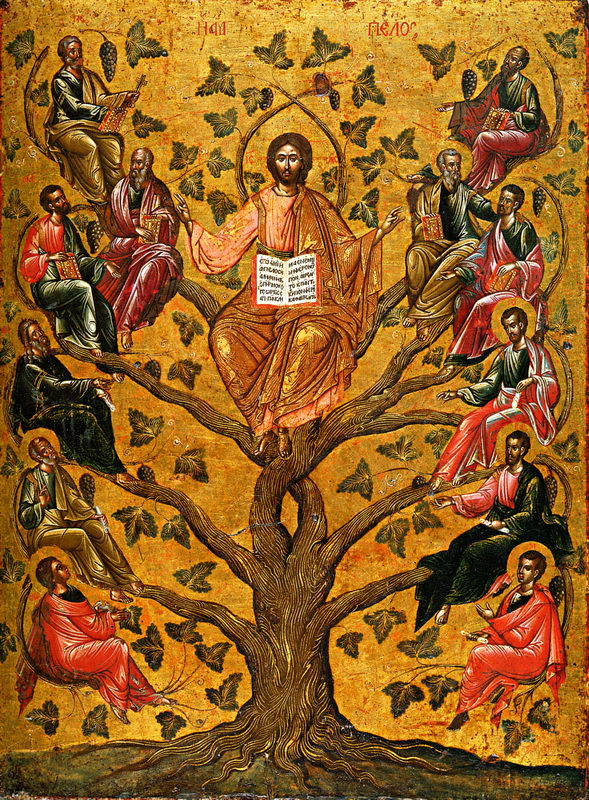
Tree of Christ (16th Century)

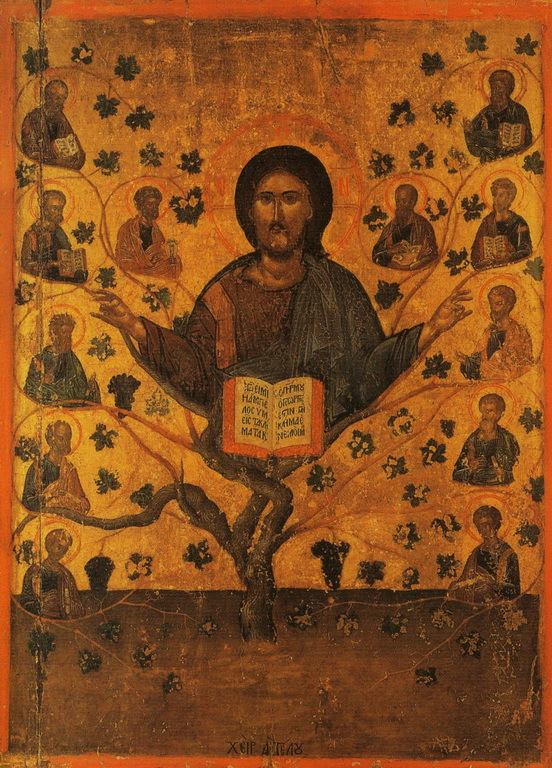
Christ the Vine Angelos

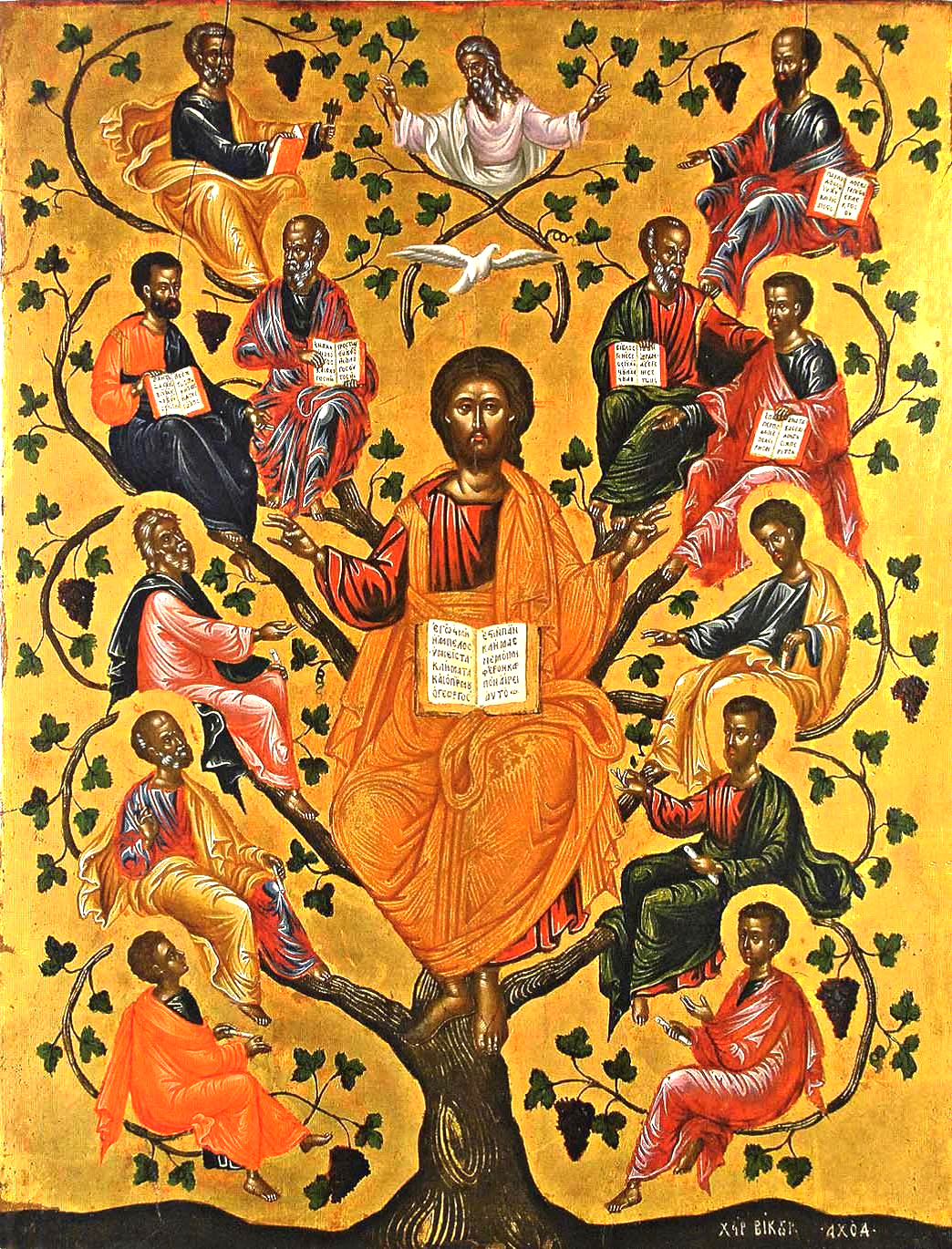
Christ the Vine (1674) Victor

== See also ==
- True Vine
