= Christ the Vine (Victor) =

Tempera painting by Victor, c. 1674

- Ο Χριστός η Άμπελος (Greek), Cristo Vera Vite (Italian)
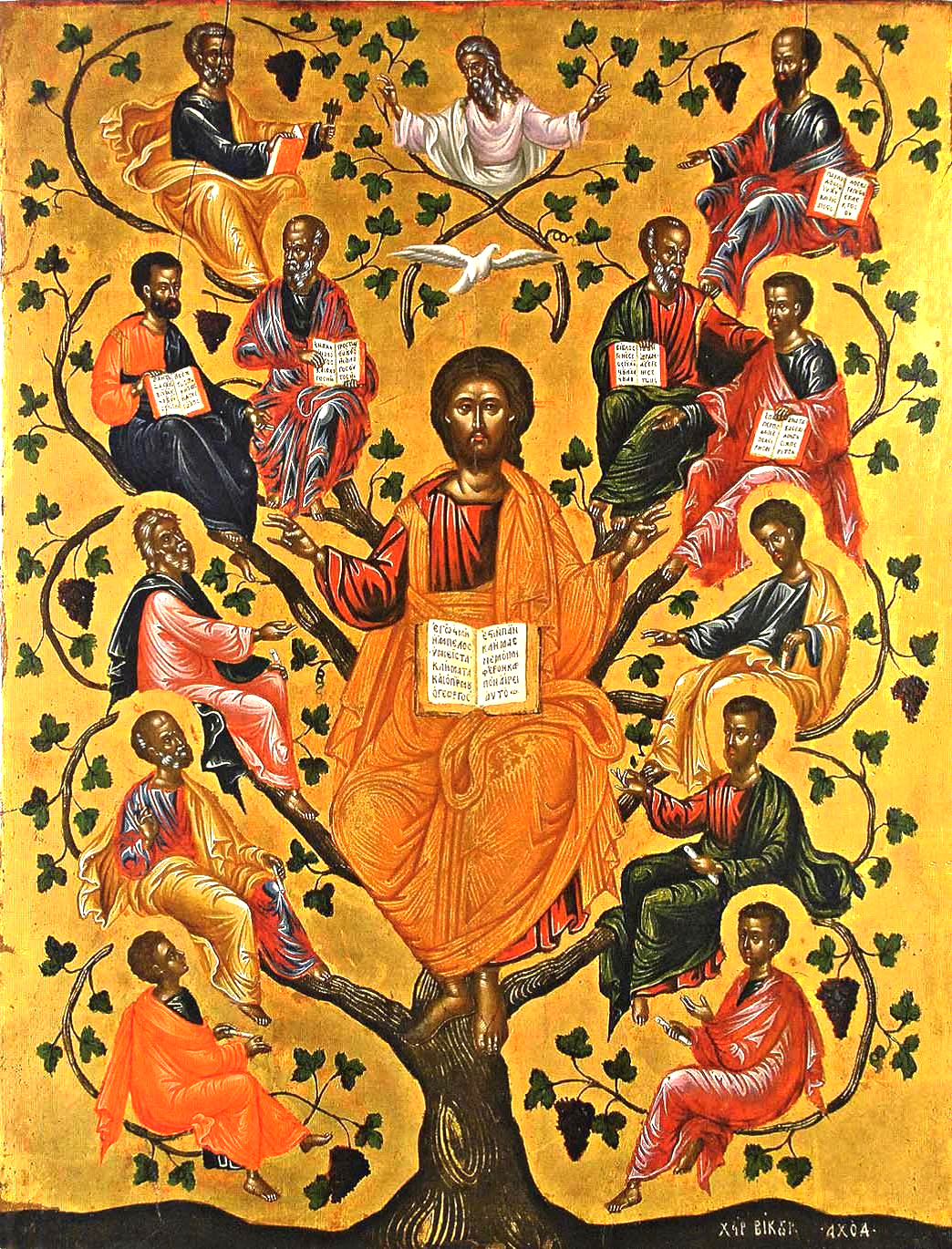
- Artist: Victor
- Year: c. 1674
- Medium: tempera on wood
- Movement: Late Cretan School
- Subject: Jesus Christ, nine original apostles with Paul the Evangelist, Luke the Evangelist and Mark the Evangelist
- Dimensions: 52 cm × 42 cm (20.4 in × 16.5 in)
- Location: Hellenic Institute of Venice, Venice, Italy
- Owner: Hellenic Institute of Venice

Christ the Vine is an egg tempera painting by Victor. Victor was a Cretan painter active during the 17th century. The painter traveled all over the Venetian empire. He eventually settled in Zakinthos. He is one of the most important painters of the 17th century due to the enormous amount of his existing works. His catalog of art exceeds over ninety-five paintings.

Christ the Vine was a popular theme among Cretan painters. Angelos Akatontos covered the theme during the early Cretan Renaissance in the 15th century. Angelo's Christ the Vine is located at the Monastery of the Virgin Hodegetria, Heraklion, Crete. Earlier versions of the theme during the Byzantine empire can be linked to the Tree of Jesse. Christ the Vine can also be associated with the parable or allegory of the True Vine from John 15:1–17. In the story, Jesus refers to his disciples as branches of himself. The gospel also consistently metaphorically references fruit. The nine original apostles with Paul the Evangelist, Luke the Evangelist and Mark the Evangelist are depicted on a tree. Leos Moskos painted a notable version also called Christ the Vine. Victor's version is part of the collection of the Hellenic Institute of Venice.

== Description ==
Christ the Vine is a tempera painting on gold leaf and wood panel. The height is 52 cm (20.4 in) and the width is 42 cm (16.5 in). The painting features nine original apostles, three evangelists, Jesus Christ, God, and the white dove. The white dove represents the holy spirit. In this rendition, the father, the son, and the holy spirit are present. Beginning from the bottom, from left to right, Thomas sits across from Philip. Traveling up the tree, the two figures in the next arrangement are Simon and Bartholomew. Simon is on the left and Bartholomew is across from him on the right. The next series of figures from left to right are Thaddeus and James. Above the central figure of Jesus, the four evangelists appear. Saint Mark and John the Evangelist are on the left. Matthew and Luke are on the right. They are listed in order from left to right. The four evangelists were very popular in Cretan Renaissance art. In this rendition, the artist preferred the four evangelists rather than the original apostles. The final two figures at the top of the image, from left to right are Saint Peter and Paul the Evangelist. Saint Peter presents the keys of heaven to God. Saint Peter is often depicted holding the keys of heaven in his left hand. The icon is significantly different than Leos Moskos and Angelos Akotantos's versions.

The Christ figure is significantly larger. The books of the five evangelists are open. The books in Christ the Vine by Leos Moskos are closed. The painting resembles Angelos Akotantos’s version because the books are open in his version. The wood panel is decorated with leaves and grapes. Just below the figure of God a wishbone symbol appears. The white dove is right above the Christ figure. Victor paints the majestic garment of Christ with the traditional orange and red common to the Cretan School. The True Vine symbolizes evangelism. The figure of God appears as the conductor of an orchestra. He is depicted as an elderly father figure. His attire is distinguishable from the other figures. The pink and white accentuate the figure's features.

The icon was first mentioned in a catalog in 1904. It was dated 1674 and signed by the artist Victor. It was part of the collection of San Giorgio dei Greci. In 1949, historians authenticated his signature and documents indicated the painting was in a school associated with the church in Venice.

== Gallery ==
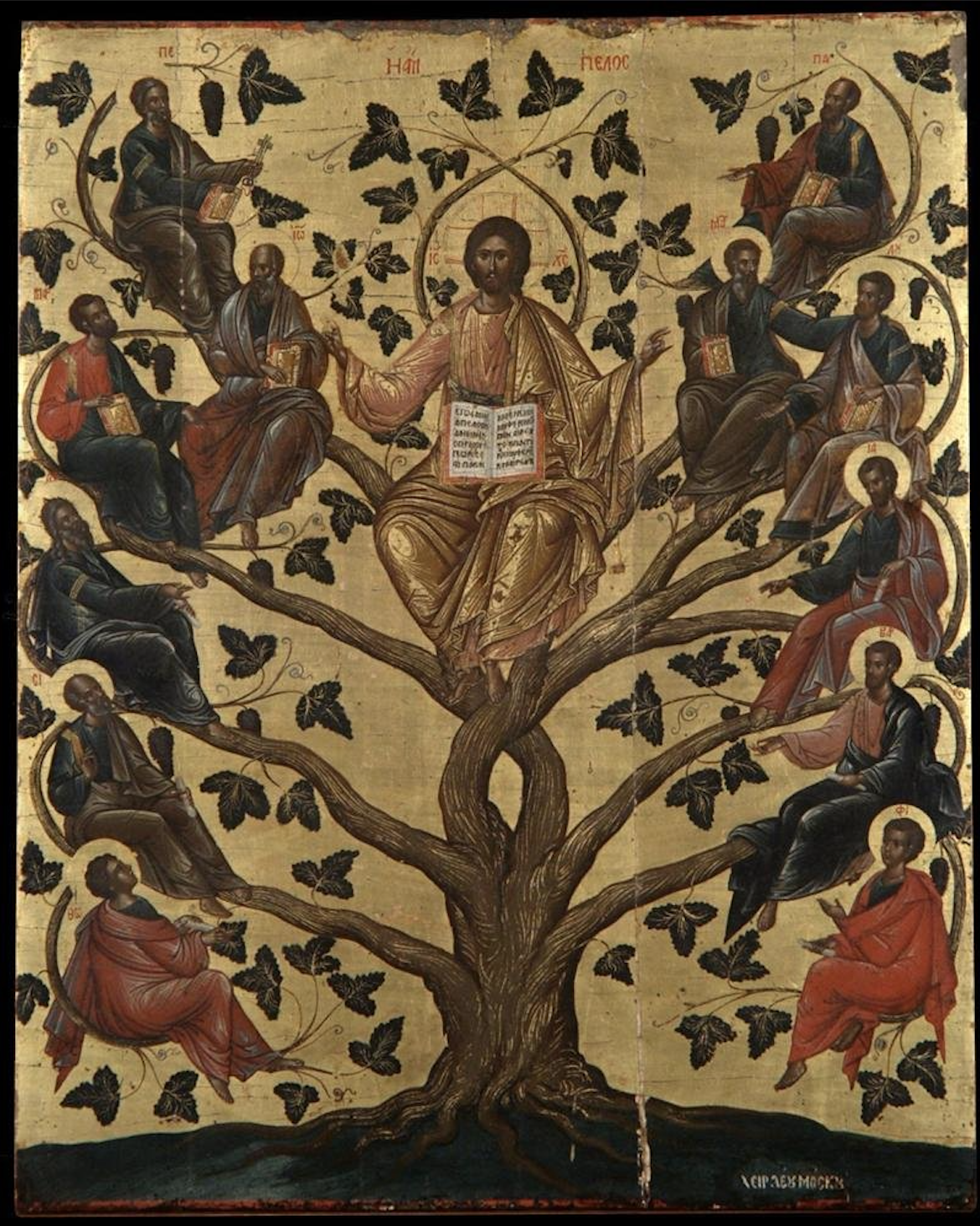
Christ the Vine Leos Moskos

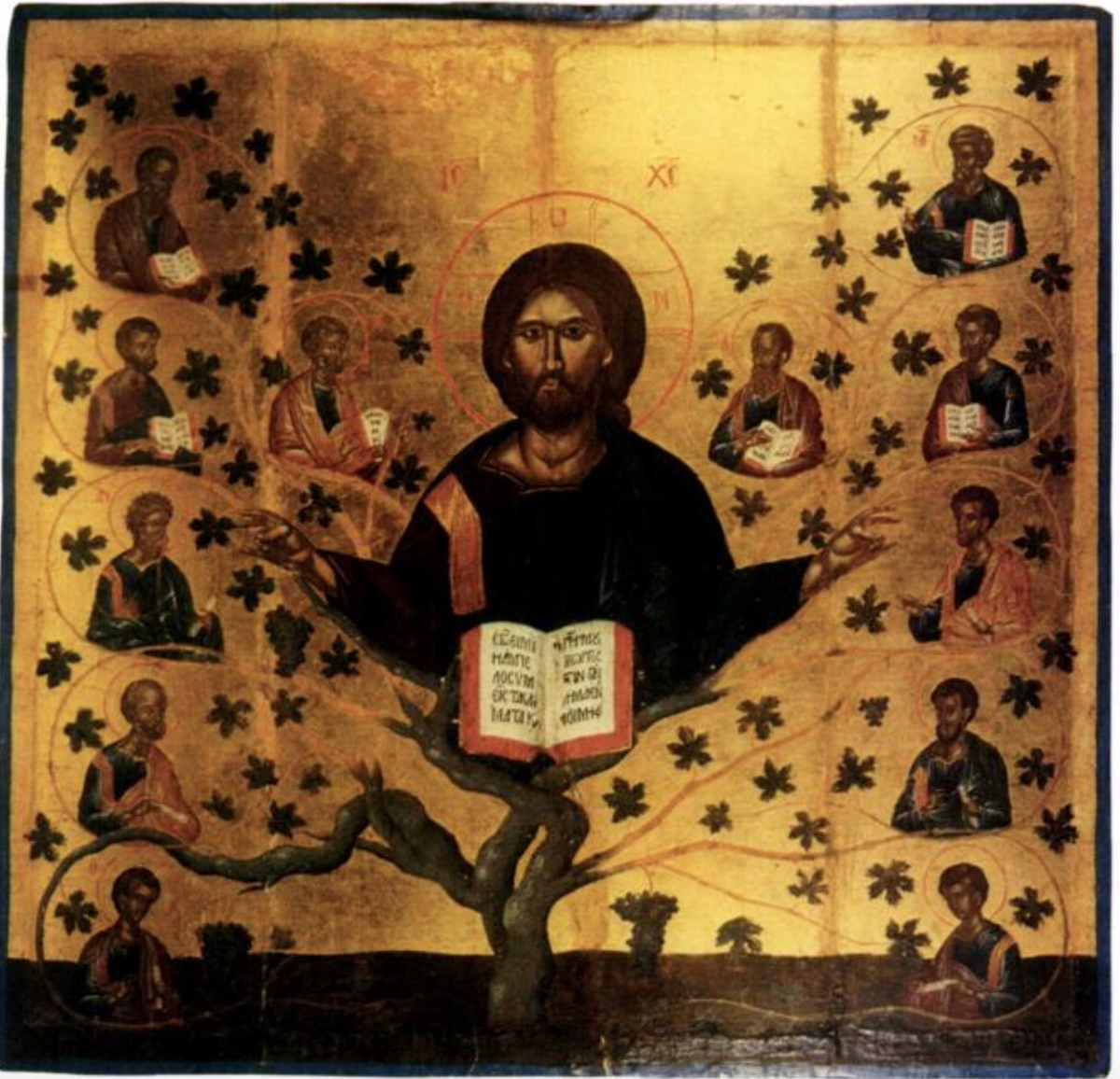
Christ the Vine Angelos

== See also ==
- True Vine
