= Victor (iconographer) =

Greek iconographer

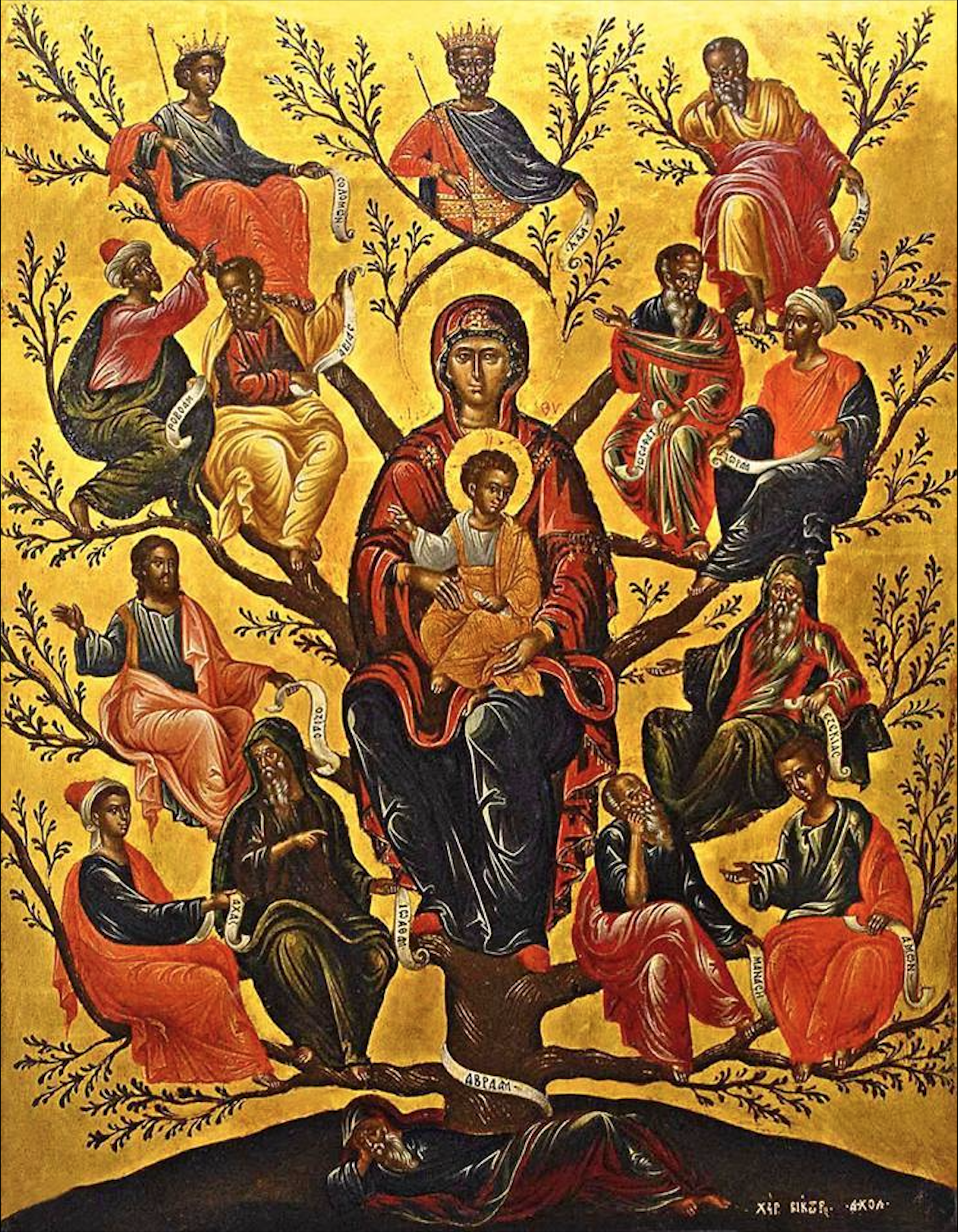
- Tree of the Virgin
- Born: 1630–1635; Heraklion, Greece
- Died: 1697; Zakynthos, Greece
- Movement: Cretan school

Victor (Greek: Βίκτωρ; 1630/1635 – 1697) was a painter active during the 17th century. He represented the late Cretan school. He was influenced by Michael Damaskinos. He kept his style simple and followed the lines of the improved maniera greca which was heavily influenced by the Venetian school. One of his main influences was Michael Damaskinos. He was active when four different artists used the name Victor. He has a huge catalog of work attributed to him. According to the Neo-Hellenic Institute, ninety-five of his paintings and one fresco survived. He was an extremely popular Greek icon painter.

== History ==
Victor was born in Chandaka which is now known as Heraklion. He was a monk working and living in the city of his birth. He was a priest at the Church of Agios Ioannis church of Mertzeroi Fraternity in Candia. He was active from 1651 to 1697. Not much is known about the artist aside from records and historical research dealing primarily with his signature. He signed his artwork in different ways either ΧΕΙΡ ΒΙΚΤΟΡΟΣ, ΧΕΙΡ ΒΙΚΤΩΡΟΣ and ΧΕΙΡ ΒΙΚΤΩΡΟΣ ΙΕΡΕΩΣ. He was extremely popular and many of his icons still exist.

Victor painted an icon for Antonio Boubouli around 1653–1654. He was the priest at San Giorgio dei Greci in Venice. He painted the Virgin and Child (Kardiotissa). It is unclear if Victor traveled to Venice. Although they did order two paintings of The Morosini Banner. Konstantinos Tzanes, Emmanuel Tzanes and Philotheos Skoufos. Were three Greek painters that migrated to Venice around the same period. Towards the end of his life, Victor traveled to the Peloponnese. The evidence is in the frescos at the Monastery of the Philosopher at Dimitsana. In the same church, they have a large assortment of portable icons with his signature. He had a special relationship with Saint Catherine's Monastery or the Sacred Monastery of the God-Trodden Mount Sinai Egypt.

There are a large number of icons attributed to this artist. His workshop was extremely popular. He specialized in portable icons. His work has a large degree of sophistication. His art does not fall in line with the traditional maniera greca which resembles Theophanes the Greek, Manuel Panselinos, and Ioannis Pagomenos. His work mostly resembles the Cretan school of the 16th century. The school by this time was heavily influenced by the Venetian school. Michael Damaskinos closely resembles some of Victor's work. Victor's Saint Catherine bears a resemblance to Philotheos Skoufos's Saint Catherine. Another similar painting between the two artists is The Stoning of Saint Steven. He was active in Zakynthos towards the end of his life.

== Gallery ==
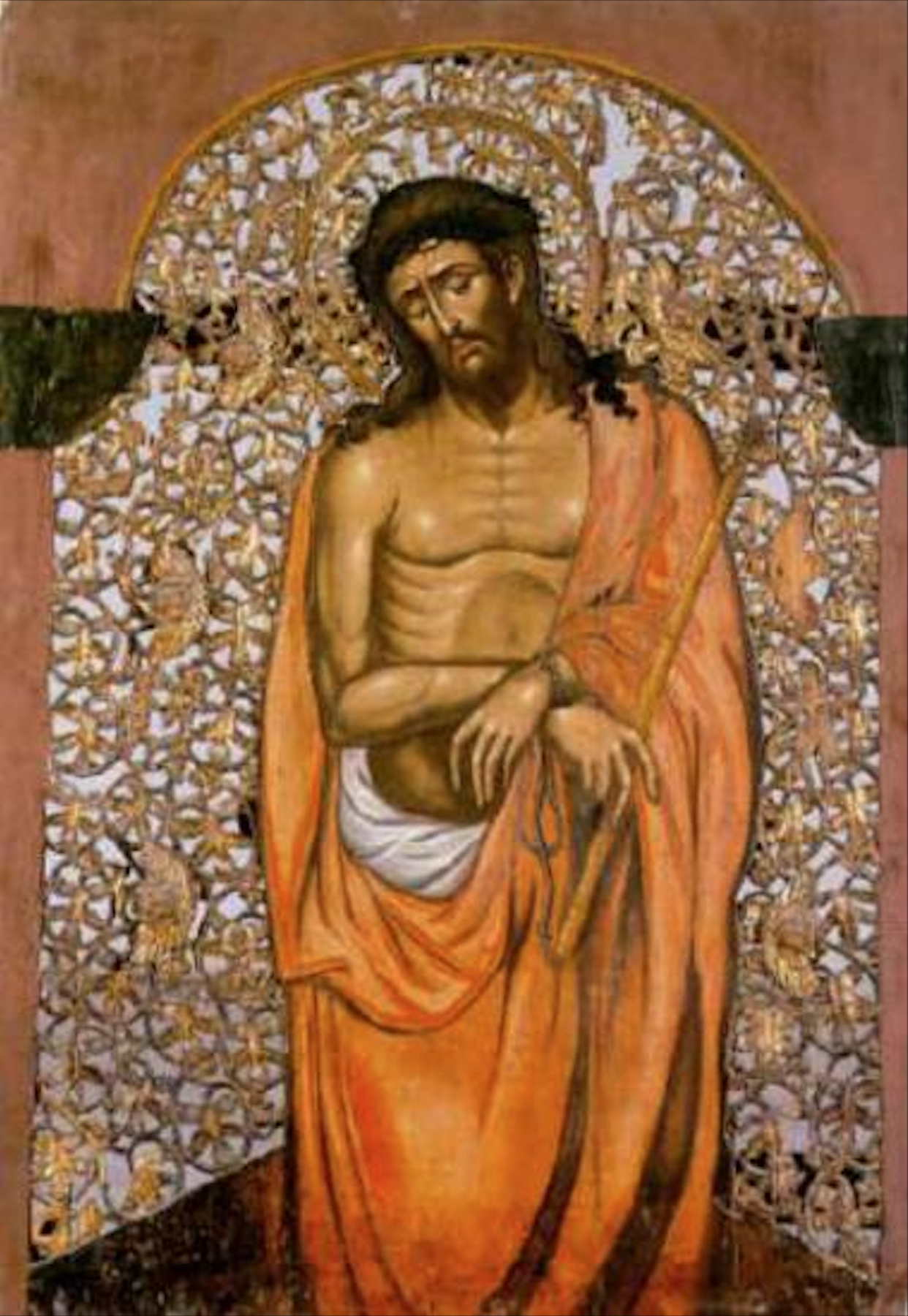
The Man of Sorrows

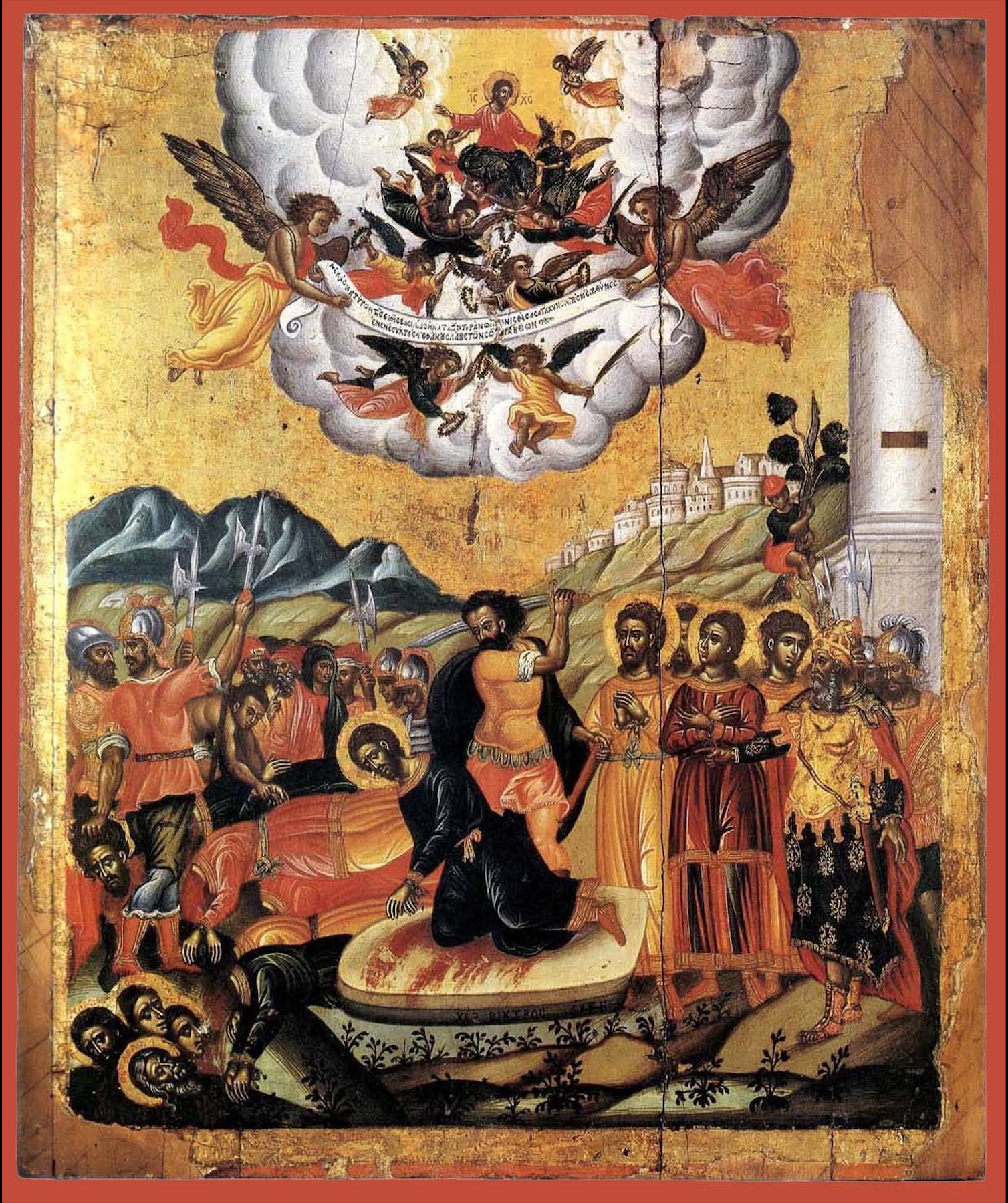
The Martyrdom of the Ten Saints

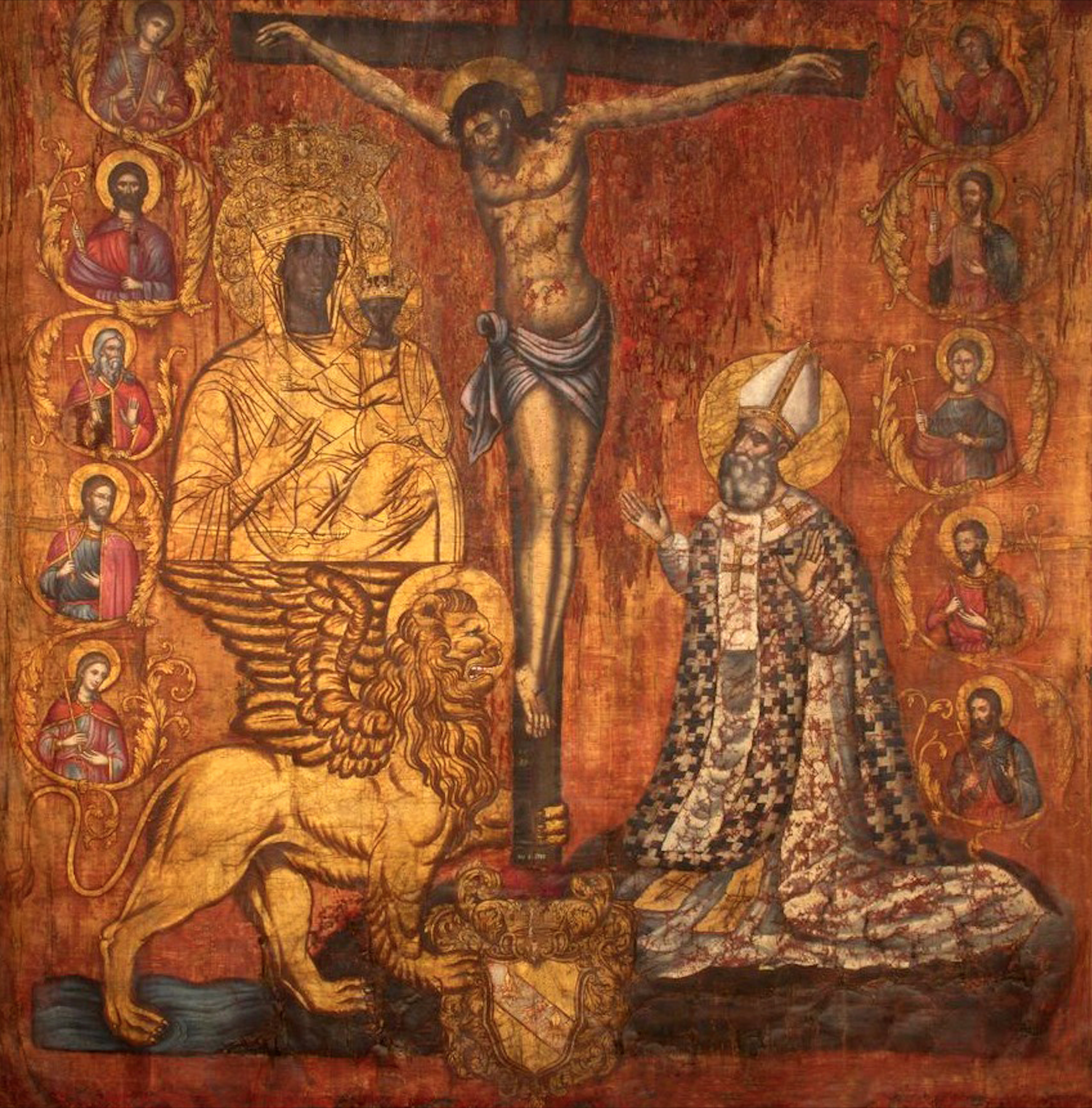
Morisini Banner

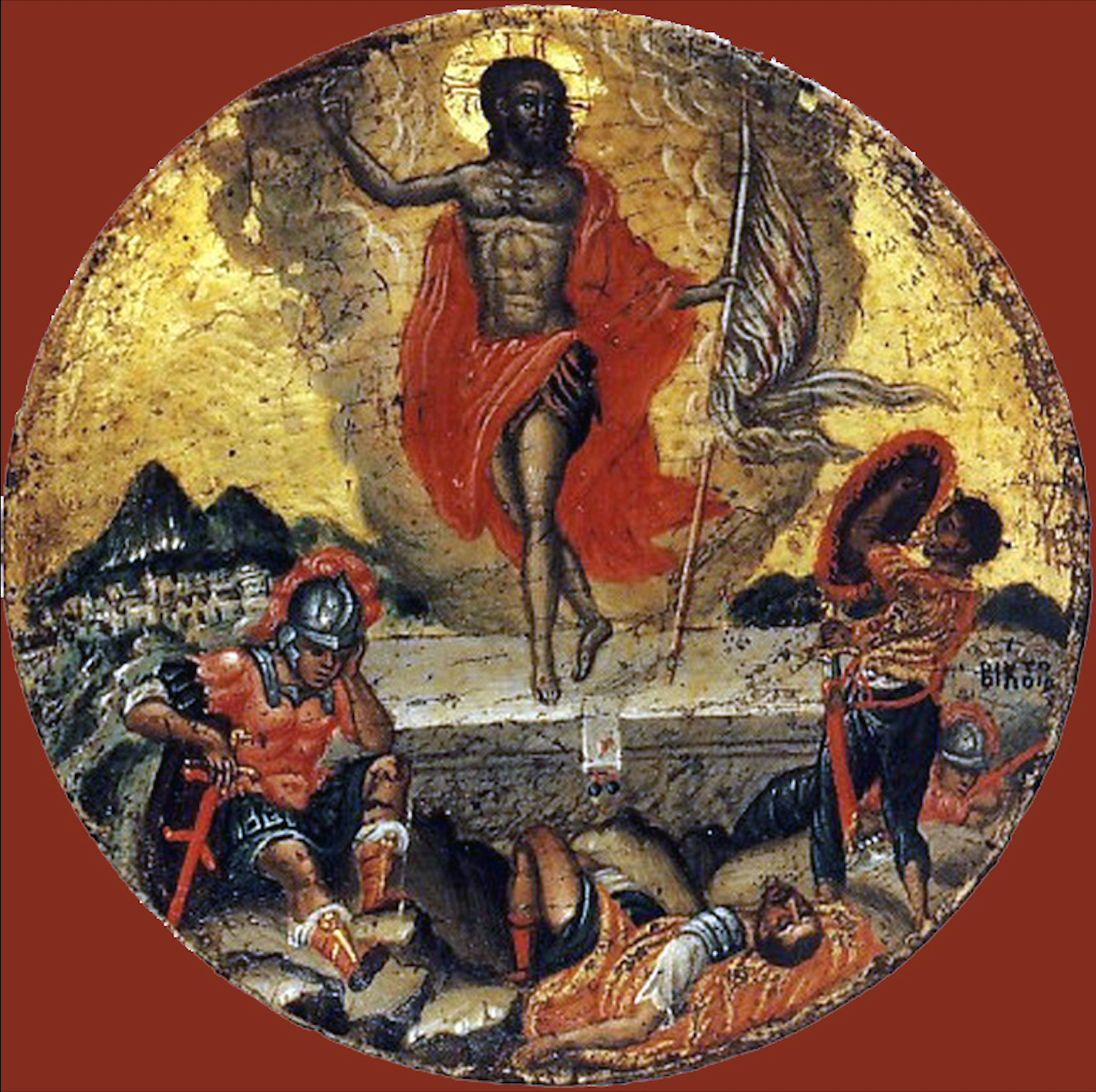
Resurrection

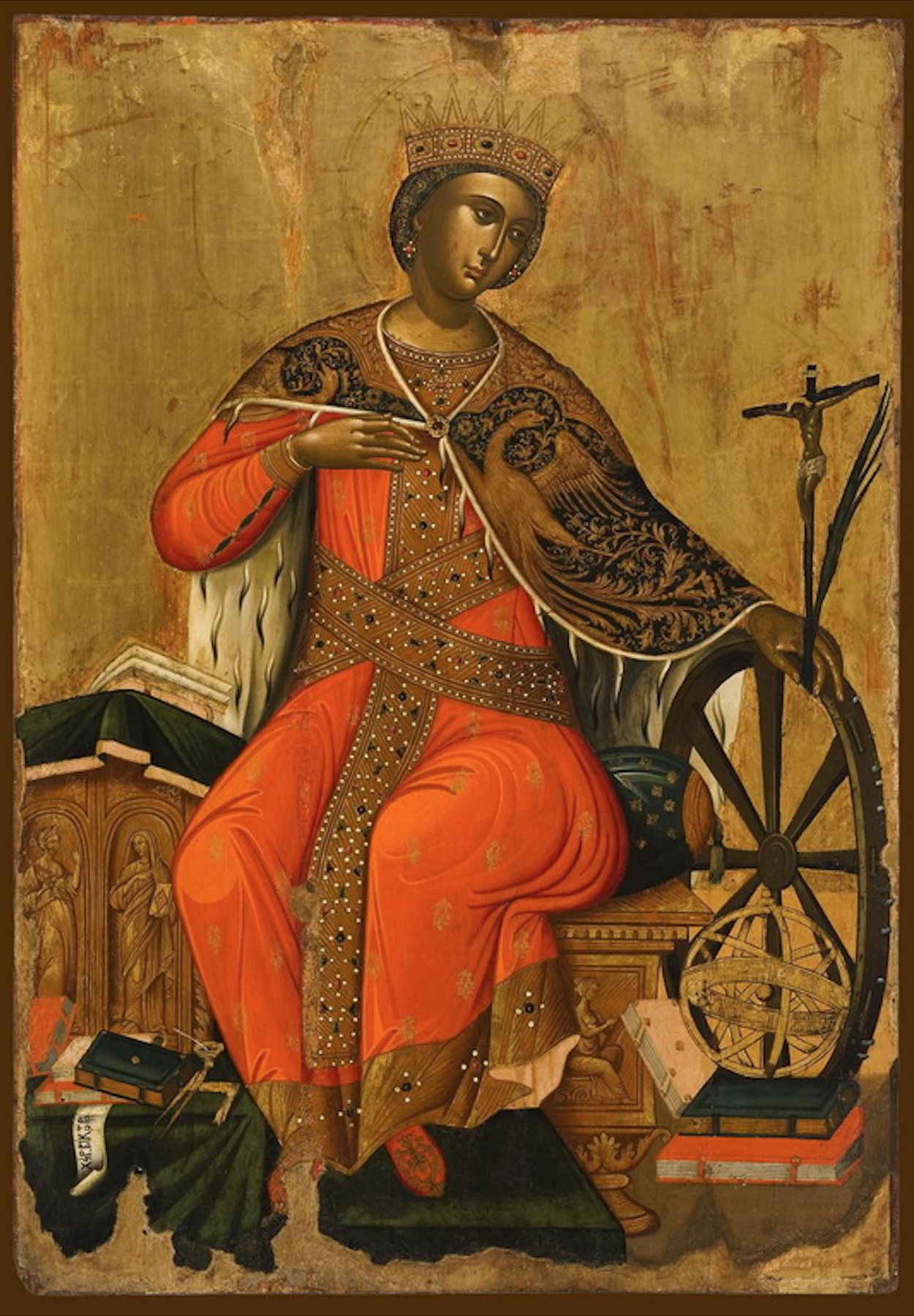
Saint Catherine

== Notable works ==
- The Stoning of St Stephen Byzantine Museum Athens Greece
- The Man of Sorrows (curtain of sanctuary gate) Museum Zakynthos Greece
- The Holy Trinity Museo Civico Correr Venice Italy
- Madre della Consolazione Agioi Theodoroi church Kerkyra Greece
- The Dormition of the Virgin (Victor) Benaki Museum, Athens, Greece
- Christ the Vine Hellenic Institute, Venice, Italy
- Nativity of Christ National Gallery of Victoria, Melbourne, Australia

== Bibliography ==
- Hatzidakis, Manolis (1987). Έλληνες Ζωγράφοι μετά την Άλωση (1450-1830). Τόμος 1: Αβέρκιος - Ιωσήφ [Greek Painters after the Fall of Constantinople (1450-1830). Volume 1: Averkios - Iosif]. Athens: Center for Modern Greek Studies, National Research Foundation. hdl:10442/14844. ISBN 960-7916-01-8.
