= Demythologization =

Approach to the study of religious texts

Demythologization as a hermeneutic approach to religious texts seeks to separate or recover cosmological, sociological and historic claims from philosophical, ethical and theological teachings. Mostly applied to biblical texts, demythologization often overlaps with philology, biblical criticism and form criticism. The term demythologization (in German: Entmythologisierung) was introduced by Rudolf Bultmann (1884–1976) in existential context, but the concept has earlier precedents.

== Spinoza's hermeneutic approach to scripture ==
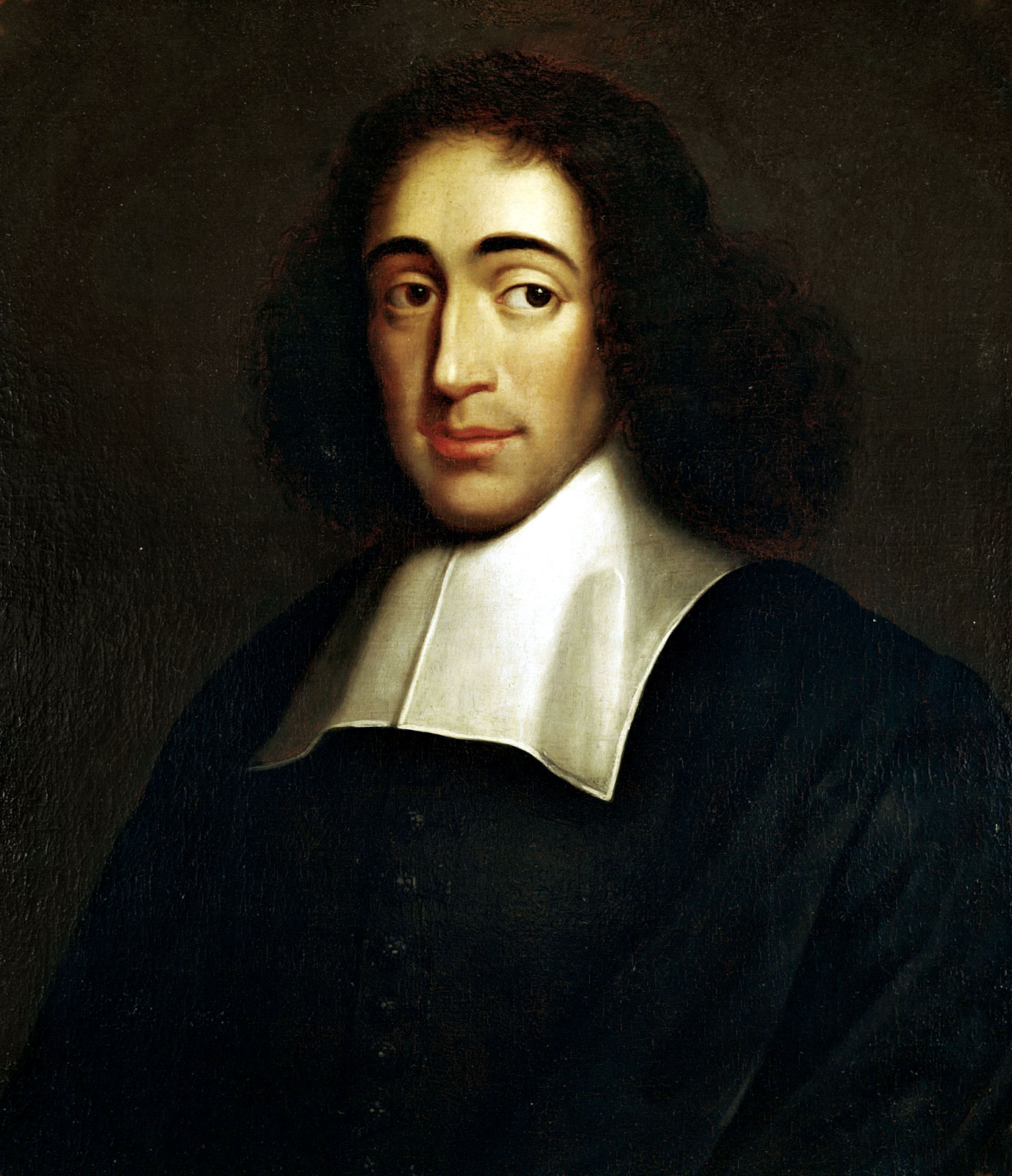
Baruch Spinoza

In his 1677 Theologico-Political Treatise, Spinoza argues that any event in scripture which is inconsistent with natural laws must be interpreted either as unreliable testimony or as a metaphorical or allegorical representation of a moral teaching. Because the masses are "wholly ignorant of the workings of nature", they are prone to interpret any natural event they cannot explain as a miracle, and this "ridiculous way of expressing ignorance" often finds its way into scripture. Scripture aims not at narrating things in terms of their natural causes, but rather at exciting the "popular imagination" to "impress the minds of the masses with devotion."

Therefore it speaks inaccurately of God and of events, seeing that its object is not to convince the reason, but to attract and lay hold of the imagination. If the Bible were to describe the destruction of an empire in the style of political historians, the masses would remain unstirred.

To correctly interpret scripture we must understand the opinions and judgments of the ancients and learn common "Jewish phrases and metaphors." Otherwise we will be prone to "confound actual events with symbolical and imaginary ones."

Many things are narrated in Scripture as real, and were believed to be real, which were in fact only symbolical and imaginary.

== Kant's Religion Within the Limits of Reason Alone ==
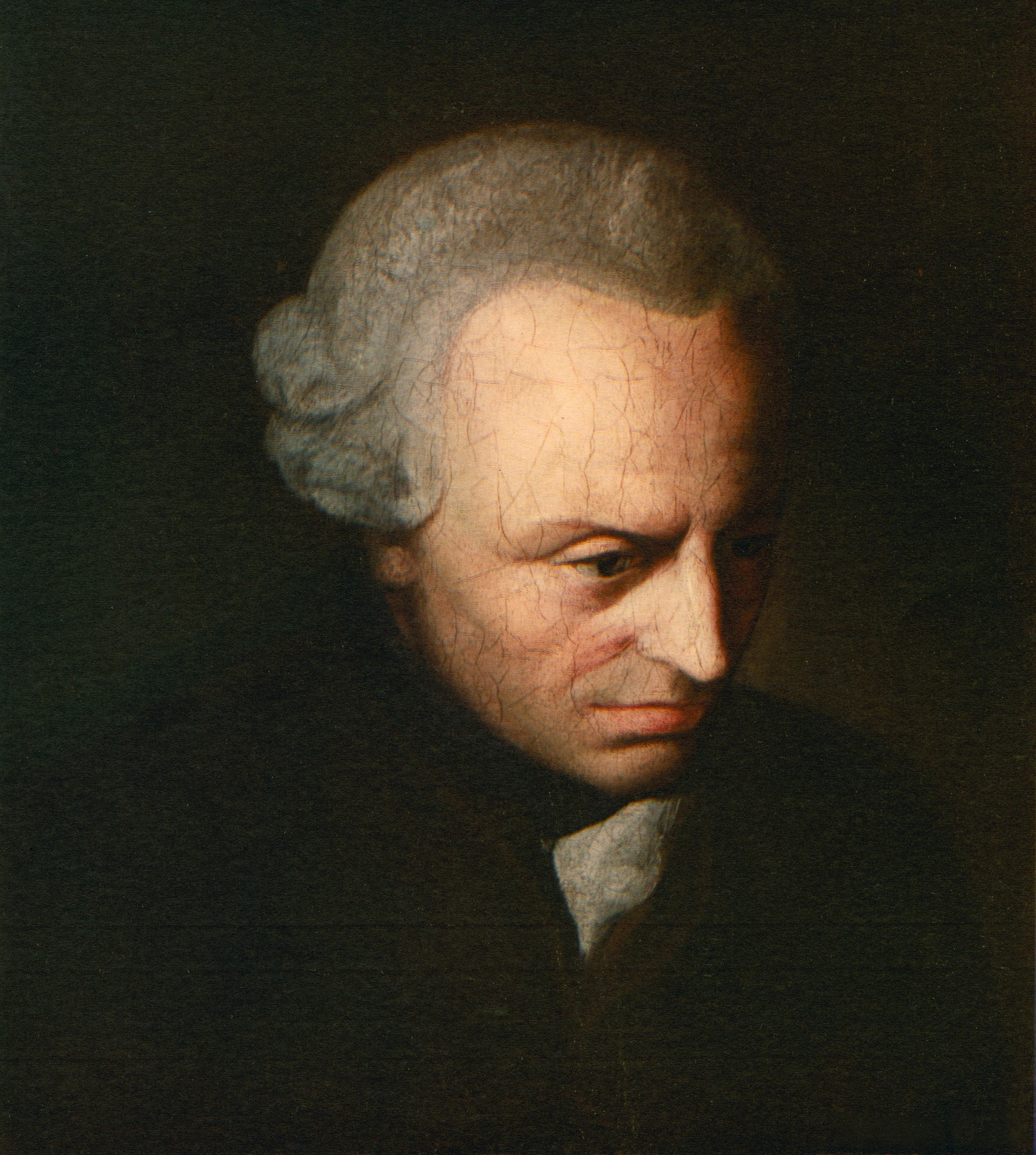
Immanuel Kant

Immanuel Kant's 1793 Religion Within the Limits of Reason Alone argues that the New Testament teaches a hermeneutic strategy in which "not scriptural scholarship but the pure religion of reason must be the law's interpreter."

[Jesus] claims that not the observance of outer civil or statutory churchly duties but the pure moral disposition of the heart alone can make man well-pleasing to God (Mt 5:20–48); that injury done one's neighbor can be repaired only through satisfaction rendered to the neighbor himself, not through acts of divine worship (Mt 5:24). Thus, he says, does he intend to do full justice to the Jewish law (Mt 5:17); whence it is obvious that not scriptural scholarship but the pure religion of reason must be the law's interpreter, for taken according to the letter, it allowed the very opposite of all this.

Kant understood the Pharisees to have interpreted the Old Testament as a statutory religion, and he claims that the New Testament intends to replace statutory religion with a "moral religion," which combines all duties into a single universal rule, "Love thy neighbor as thyself."

Whatever, over and above good life-conduct, man fancies that he can do to become well-pleasing to God is mere religious delusion.

Such delusion, Kant argues, must be abandoned to fulfill the New Testament's demand for a rational religion.

== Hans Jonas's analysis of Gnosticism ==
Hans Jonas (1903–1993) was a German-Jewish philosopher, whose studies were supervised by Martin Heidegger and Rudolf Bultmann (see below). Graduating in 1929, the topic of his doctoral dissertation was the concept of (Gnostic) Gnosis, based at large on the demythologization of Gnostic myths. He published a revised version of his dissertation in two volumes. The first volume, titled Gnosis und spätantiker Geist I: Die mythologische Gnosis (Gnosis and the spirit of late antiquity I: The Mythological Gnosis), was published in 1934, and focused on a relatively direct application of Jonas's phenomenological analysis of Gnostic qua phenomena. Due to World War II, the theoretical part was published in late 1954, as Gnosis und spätantiker Geist II: Von der Mythologie zur mystischen Philosophie (From Mythology to Mystic Philosophy). Thus, Jonas's contributions to demythologization were available for a select few scholars as of 1929 (including Bultmann and Scholem, Jonas's personal friend), but were published later than their seminal works during the late 1930s and early 1940s.

== Bultmann's New Testament and Mythology ==
The German theologian Rudolf Bultmann argues in his 1941 New Testament and Mythology that it is no longer plausible to demand that Christians accept the "mythical world picture" of the New Testament.

We cannot use electric lights and radios and, in the event of illness, avail ourselves of modern medical and clinical means and at the same time believe in the spirit and wonder world of the New Testament.

To interpret New Testament mythology in cosmological terms, as a description of the universe, is not plausible. This interpretation must be superseded by an anthropological interpretation that "discloses the truth of the kerygma as kerygma for those who do not think mythologically."

Can the Christian proclamation today expect men and women to acknowledge the mythical world picture as true? To do so would be both pointless and impossible. It would be pointless because there is nothing specifically Christian about the mythical world picture, which is simply the world picture of a time now past which was not yet formed by scientific thinking. It would be impossible because no one can appropriate a world picture by sheer resolve, since it is already given with one's historical situation.

== See also ==
- Biblical criticism
- Christian atheism
- Death of God theology
- Euhemerism
- Religious delusion
