= Language event =

Language event (German: Sprachereignis) is an act or instance of written or spoken communication. In the 1920s earliest use of the word was found in Journal of Philosophy. In theology this word was used by Ernest Fuchs, relating to New Hermeneutic. Fuchs' doctrine of language helped to inspire a "new quest" for the historical Jesus because it could now be said that Jesus' words and deeds constituted that "language event" in which faith first entered into language, thereby becoming available as an existential possibility within language, the "house of being" (Heidegger). Conversely, the reality of God's love is verbalized in Jesus' words and deeds recorded in the Gospels and is thus preserved as language gain (German: Sprachgewinn). In the freedom of proclamation God's presence in the gospel as the "Yes of love" happens again-that is, comes to be as language, opening up the future to authentic existence (faith, hope, and love).

== Paul ==
According to the Epistles of Paul, the proclaimed Word of God effects and creates faith. Faith is thus the creature of the word ("creatura verbi"). So it says in Paul's letter to the Romans (Rom 10,17 EU): "Faith thus comes from preaching, but preaching by the word of Christ." Thus, for Paul, faith arises from hearing the apostolic message of faith. Yet this "fides ex auditu" is a gift from God.

== Martin Luther ==
Martin Luther defines the believing people as "homo audiens". According to him, listening to the Word requires faith in man. This "verbality" of faith is central to his theology. Again and again, he emphasizes the vocabulary of faith and that the word should be praised as a means of grace. Faith embraces the word that is offered to it. So it is z. E.g. in his second Psalm lecture (1519/20) on Ps 18.45 VUL:

"Actum igitur credendi (ut vocant) nescio quibus verbis possis aptius eloqui quam ista periphrasi divina:" auditu auris audivit mihi ", hoc est, stultus sibi fuit populus gentium, ut mihi crederet in his, quae non videret nec caperet."

- Martin Luther: WA 5, 537, 3 "Therefore, I do not know with which words you could pronounce the event of faith (as they call it) more fittingly than by this divine description:" It [the people] hears me with obedient ears ", that is to say, simple is for themselves the people of People so that it believed me in things that neither saw nor grasped. "

By referring to the passage as a "transcription", Luther means the "inner" and "spiritual" hearing through which the act of believing (actum credendi) is characterized. In accordance with such a Lutheran understanding of the word, Fuchs will later develop his theory of the language event.

== Ernst Fuchs ==
Ernest Fuchs insisted that speeches from the language event is in the Pauline-Lutheran tradition. For Fuchs, word and faith essentially belong together: faith has its essence from its relationship to the word. Faith is the listening to the word that meets it, by which he means the Gospel concretely. For this reason, Fuchs sees the speech event as the unfolding of faith: it causes the listener to change the situation from "not-being" to being in the existence of God. This understanding of speech thus represents a fundamental category of his hermeneutics. Fuchs is keen to emphasize the passivity of man. For this he uses the term of silence. Man does not move in her, but is moved by the speech event. Language live on the silence. In the language event, the language itself leads to that silence of which it lives. In addition, Fuchs sees his statements of eloquent and significant language parallel to the distinction between being and being (see also Heidegger). While merely indicative language offers only an expression of beings, a speech event justifies being and allows it to be present. Fuchs applies his doctrine of the linguistic event to various theological disciplines, namely, the preaching of Jesus, the theology of Paul and the Easter event.

== Gerhard Ebeling ==
Gerhard Ebeling continues to use the concept of the language event as a demarcation to dogmatic doctrine. Ebeling understands the sacrament as "language event".

== Eberhard Jüngel ==
Eberhard Jüngel, theologically influenced by Ernest Fuchs, proved to be a proponent of the language event. He took it over in his book "Paul and Jesus" as a demarcation to Rudolf Bultmann.

== See also ==
- New Hermeneutic
- Ernst Fuchs (theologian)
- Gerhard Ebeling
