= Ky-Chun So =

South Korean theologian (born 1958)

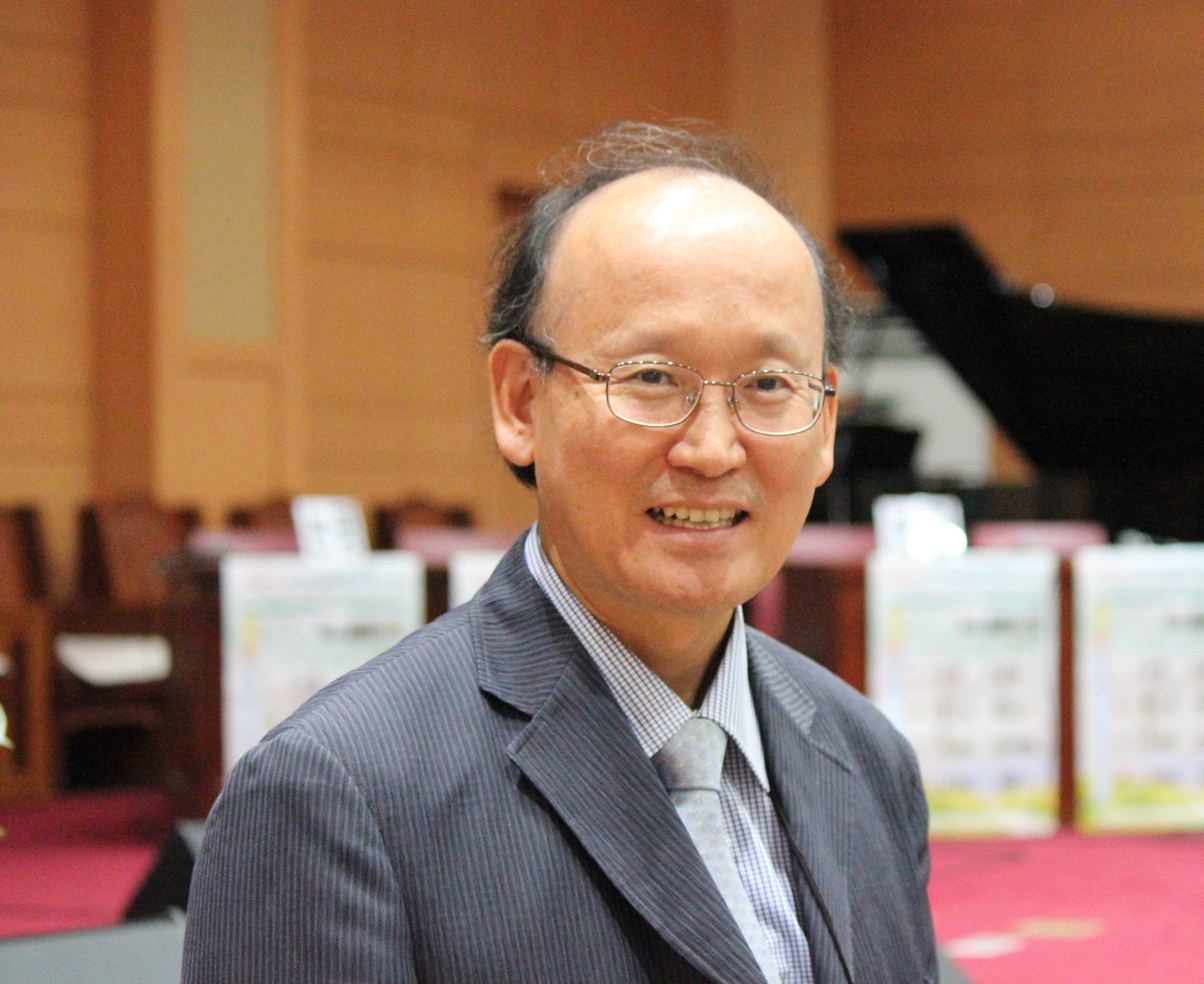
- Professor Ky-Chun So(소기천 교수)
- Born: June 10, 1958 (age 68); South Korea
- Occupations: Professor, Academic and Theologian
- Known for: Early Christianity, Historical Jesus, Oral gospel traditions, Q source
- Title: Kwang Jang Chair Professor of the New Testament, Early Christianity, and the Nag Hammadi Library

Academic background
- Education: Th.B (1981), Th.M. (1982), M.Div (1984), Ph.D. (1998)
- Alma mater: Claremont School of Theology, Claremont Graduate University

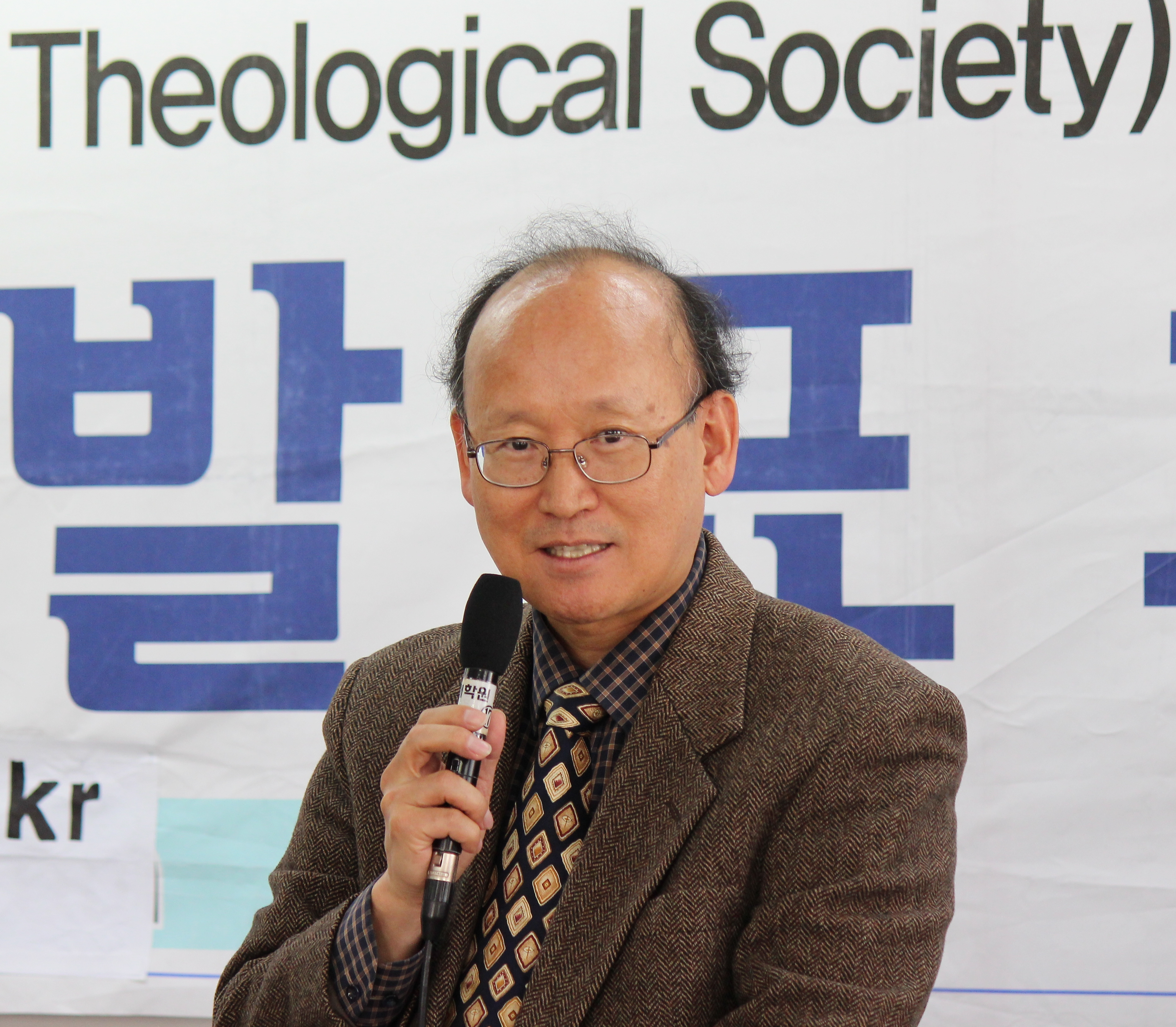
Professor Ky-Chun So speaking at the Korea Reformed Theological Society meeting

Ky-Chun So(Korean: 소기천; born 10 June 1958) is a South Korean theologian and is the Kwang Jang Chair Professor of the New Testament, Early Christianity, and the Nag Hammadi Library at Presbyterian University and Theological Seminary in Seoul. At Claremont School of Theology and the Claremont Graduate University, California, USA, he studied New Testament theology, Nag Hammadi texts and Gospels from James M. Robinson, a disciple of Rudolf Bultmann.

== Career ==
Since 1989, So has been involved in researching the restoration of the historical Jesus' sayings. He also belongs to the International Q project of the Society of Biblical Literature (SBL). He is the co-editor of the Critical Edition of Q source. He published Jesus in Q: The Sabbath and Theology of the Bible and Extracanonical Texts, a study of the relationship between the Sabbath and the theology of Jesus in 2017. He published the book on Ernst Fuchs and Gerhard Ebelling in 2006. He is now the head of the Jesus Sayings Hub in Korea, the president of the Society of Korean Q Studies, and the secretary of the Korea Reformed Theological Society 한국개혁신학회. It is the preparation committee for the 500th anniversary of the Reformation.

== Publications ==
=== Thesis ===
- So, Ky-Chun (1999). The Sabbath Controversy of Jesus: between Jewish law and the Gentile mission (Ph.D.). Claremont, CA: Claremont Graduate University. OCLC 40550247.

=== Books ===
- ——— (2006). 훅스 & 에벨링 Fuchs & Ebeling: History of Hermeneutics and New Hermeneutics. Seoul: Salim Publishing House.
- ——— (2017). Jesus in Q: The Sabbath and Theology of the Bible and Extracanonical Texts. Eugene, OR: Wipf & Stock. ISBN 9781498282116. OCLC 973291702.

=== Journal articles ===
- ——— (2000). "Jesus' Understanding of Spirit". Korean Journal of Theology. 2: 52–69.
- ——— (May 2001). "Jewish Influences on Gnosticism in the Apocalypse of Adam". Presbyterian Journal of Theology. 1 (1): 49–74.
- ——— (May 2002). "A Tradition-History Development of the Meals". Korean Presbyterian Journal of Theology. 2: 33–47.
- ——— (Autumn 2002). "The Eschatology of the Q Community". Korean New Testament Studies: Journal of the New Testament Society of Theology. 9 (3): 619–636.
- ——— (May 2003). "Dating Q Regarding to the Community Rules in Jesus' Inaugural Sermon". Korean Presbyterian Journal of Theology. 3: 32–65.
- ——— (December 2003). "Jewish Mission and Gentile Mission in the New Testament". Mission and Theology. 12: 350–365.
- ——— (May 2005). "The God of Jesus, the Q Community, and the Gospel of Luke". Korean Presbyterian Journal of Theology. 5: 9–27.
- ——— (2006). "The Sabbath and the Synoptic Problem". Theological Forum. 43 (2): 767–782.
- ——— (May 2006). "Christological Insights: Between the Psalms of Solomon and the Sayings Gospel Q (1)". Korean Presbyterian Journal of Theology. 6: 31–54.
- ——— (2007). "A Theological and Anthropological Understanding of Creation: on Focus of Genesis 1-2". Deep Word Clear Teaching: A Paper on the Commencement of Retirement of Professor Cheong Hoon Kang. Seoul: Written in the Land: 414–427.
- ——— (May 2007). "Christological Insights: Between the Psalms of Solomon and the Sayings Gospel Q (2)". Korean Presbyterian Journal of Theology. 7: 3–39.
- ——— (May 2008). "A Study of Thomas Christianity". Korean Presbyterian Journal of Theology. 8: 25–46.
- ——— (2009). "James M. Robinson's Impacts on Korean New Testament Scholarship". Korean Presbyterian Journal of Theology. 9: 23–52.
- ——— (2013). "Religion and Science: 4 Different Ways to Solve Its Relationship". Journal of Asian and Asian American Theology. 11: 118–139.
- ——— (2014). "An Inter-textual Study on the Narrative of the Raising of the Widow's Son from Nain (Luke 7:11-17)". Church and Theology. 78: 67–86.* ——— (2014). "Q 14:5 and the Sabbath Controversy". Reformed Theory and Practice. 7: 199–230.
- ——— (2015). "A Study of the Jewish Sabbath". Church and Theological Seminary. 79: 41–61.
- ——— (2016). "A Study of the Sabbath Institutions and Observances". Church and Theological Seminary. 80: 65–82.

=== Chapters ===
- ——— (2009). "Recent Trends in the Study of the Historical Jesus in Korea". In Boyer, Chrystian; Rochais, Gérard (eds.). The Historical Jesus around The World. Montreal: Éditions Fides. ISBN 9782762127645. OCLC 977390113.
