= TVZ =

TVZ may refer to:

- Taupō Volcanic Zone, a volcanic area in the North Island of New Zealand
- TVZ Theologischer Verlag Zürich AG, a Swiss religious publisher
- TV Zimbo, a satellite television station in Angola
- Townes Van Zandt, an American singer and songwriter
- Tver Carriage Works (Tverskoj Vagonostroitelnij Zavod, TVZ), a rolling stock manufacturer in Tver, Russia
- MyTVZ, the branding of WTVZ-TV, a television station in Norfolk, Virginia, United States
- Television Zanzibar (TVZ), former name of ZBC TV, a television station in Zanzibar, Tanzania
- TVZ (TV show), a Brazilian music show on Multishow
- Zagreb University of Applied Sciences (Tehničko veleučilište u Zagrebu, TVZ), a polytechnic university in Zagreb, Croatia
