= Antje Bultmann Lemke =

German-born librarian (1918–2017)

- Born: Antje Bultmann; 27 July 1918; Breslau, Germany
- Died: 15 May 2017 (aged 98); Syracuse, New York, U.S.
- Occupations: Librarian; translator; classical musician
- Board member of: Board member of the Onondaga County Public Libraries and Albert Schweitzer Friendship House
- Spouse: Rudolf Lemke
- Relatives: Jan Diesselhorst (nephew)
- Awards: Guggenheim Fellowship (1960)

Academic background
- Education: Leipzig University; Syracuse University School of Information Studies

Academic work
- Institutions: Syracuse University School of Information Studies

Antje Bultmann Lemke (27 July 1918 – 15 May 2017) was a German-born librarian, translator, and classical musician. After abandoning plans for a medical doctor career due to Adolf Hitler's rise to power, she studied library science at Leipzig University and aided in the German resistance to Nazism. After World War II, she fled the Soviet occupation zone in Germany and was a founder of Informationen für die Frau. She moved to the United States where she obtained her master degree from Syracuse University, where she later worked as a librarian and professor.

A 1960 Guggenheim Fellow, she was a published translator and helped preserve the work of polymath Albert Schweitzer. Outside of academia, she was a violinist and violist for the Syracuse Symphony Orchestra, and she promoted the development of other local libraries.

== Biography ==
Antje Bultmann was born on 27 July 1918 in Breslau, to Helene and theologian Rudolf Bultmann. She originally planned a career as a medical doctor, but with Adolf Hitler's rise to power, the Nazi regime required all medical school students to be party members, so she had to switch to librarian training. From 1942 to 1944, she attended the Leipzig University, where she obtained a library science degree. She also worked as a courier and hid targets of Nazism for the resistance.

After the Nazi regime collapsed, she was forced to work at a Zeiss factory in the Soviet occupation zone in Germany, though she found work as an assistant director at the Thuringian State Library from 1945 to 1946. Escaping to West Berlin in a wooden box marked as a telescope, she worked as a 1949-1950 Bryn Mawr College fellow and was a founder of the journal Informationen für die Frau. She also served as director of the Hessian Women's Service Bureau in 1951.

Moving to the United States, she obtained her MLS from Syracuse University's School of Library Science (now the iSchool) in 1954 or 1956. In 1956, she became a library science lecturer at SU. She was promoted to instructor in 1961, assistant professor in 1963, and associate professor in 1966, before eventually becoming professor emerita. She taught courses on bibliography and graduate seminars, as well as abroad lectures in Germany and Puerto Rico. She also worked at SU as an art and music librarian and as a circulation librarian, and she served in the SU senate and chaired the Libraries Courier. In 1986, she retired from the iSchool.

She authored Mitarbeiten aber wie (1954), and she translated the prologue for an 1958 edition of Aldus Manutius' Thesaurus Cornucopiae et Horti Adonidis. In 1960, Lemke was awarded a Guggenheim Fellowship "for studies of German libraries in the Age of Enlightenment"; her Guggenheim Fellowship research focused on the Brothers Grimm. She and Ruth Fleiss co-authored Museum Companion: A Dictionary of Art Terms and Subjects (c. 1974).

She helped preserve the work of polymath Albert Schweitzer, accumulating his archives at SU with the help of his daughter Rhena Schweitzer Miller, and she translated two books written by him: Out of My Life and Thought: An Autobiography and The Albert Schweitzer-Helene Bresslau Letters, 1902-1912. She served ten years as the board president of the Albert Schweitzer Friendship House during the 1970s and 1980s. She also promoted the development of other local libraries, with The Post-Standard called her "instrumental in the establishment and development of the Everson Museum library", and she served as a board member for Onondaga County Public Libraries.

Lemke, who studied violin during her youth, was a violinist and violist for the Syracuse Symphony Orchestra, where she played under the helm of conductor Louis Krasner. She was also a skilled harpsichordist and recorder player.

She lived in Fayetteville, New York with a colleague. She was also a close friend of filmmaker Erica Anderson, cinematographer of Albert Schweitzer; the two met after being connected together by one of Lemke's students. She was married to psychiatrist and neurologist Rudolf Lemke. Her brother-in-law was jurist Malte Diesselhorst and her nephew was cellist Jan Diesselhorst. The Temple Society of Concord named her a Righteous Gentile in 1998.

Lemke died on 15 May 2017 at Van Duyn Nursing Home in Syracuse, aged 98. The Antje Bultmann Lemke Seminar Room at SU's Special Collections Research Center is named after her, as are the Antje Lemke Book Award for the iSchool's library and information science graduate students and a conference room at Hinds Hall. Her papers are held in the Syracuse University Archives.
