= Redaction criticism =

Critical method for the study of biblical texts

Redaction criticism, also called Redaktionsgeschichte, Kompositionsgeschichte or Redaktionstheologie, is a critical method for the study of biblical texts. Redaction criticism regards the author of the text as editor (redactor) of the source materials. Unlike its parent discipline, form criticism, redaction criticism does not look at the various parts of a narrative to discover the original genre. Instead, it focuses on how the redactor shaped and moulded the narrative to express theological and ideological goals.

== Methodology ==
There are several ways in which redaction critics detect editorial activity like the following:

1. The repetition of common motifs and themes (for example, in Matthew's Gospel, the fulfillment of prophecy).
2. Comparison between two accounts. Does a later account add, omit or conserve parts of an earlier account of the same event?
3. The vocabulary and style of a writer. Does the text reflect preferred words for the editor, or are there words that the editor rarely uses or attempts to avoid using? If the wording reflects the language of the editor, it points toward editorial reworking of a text, but if it is unused or avoided language, it points toward being part of an earlier source.

== History ==
Although redaction criticism (the possibility of the various gospels having different theological perspectives) has existed since Antiquity, three modern day scholars are regularly credited with this school's modern development: Gunther Bornkamm, Willi Marxsen and Hans Conzelmann (see Bornkamm, Barth and Held, Tradition and Interpretation in Matthew, Marxsen, Mark the Evangelist, Conzelmann, Theology of St Luke).

A prominent work of early redaction criticism is Elizabeth Cady Stanton's The Woman's Bible (1898).

== Conclusions ==
From the changes, redaction critics can sketch out the distinctive elements of an author/editor's theology. If a writer consistently avoids reporting, for example, the weaknesses of the Twelve Apostles, even when there are earlier sources that provide lurid details of their follies, one could draw the conclusion that the later editor/author held the Twelve in higher esteem because the editor had presuppositions, or because the editor was perhaps trying to reinforce the legitimacy of those chosen by Jesus to carry on his work. By tracking the overall impact of this editorial activity, one can come away with a fairly strong picture of the purpose of a particular text.

== Advantages ==
1. It emphasizes the creative role of the author.
2. Redaction critics from disparate traditions and presuppositions can still find wide agreement on their work since the purpose of an author/editor largely can still be recovered.
3. It can show us some of the environment in the communities to which works were written. If an author is writing a Gospel, he is probably trying to correct or reinforce some issue in the social setting of the community in which he is writing.
4. It recognizes the possibility that historical narratives in the Bible are concerned less with chronological accounts of historic events but with theological agendas (but that does not require one to believe that the accounts are not historically factual).

== Disadvantages ==
1. In Gospel studies, it often assumes Marcan priority, a position with wide but not unanimous support.
2. Such methodology may unwarrantedly imply that the author is too "creative" and thus give a false account of the reliability of the text.
3. Sometimes, it is wrongly asserted on the basis of redaction criticism that what has been added or modified in a text is unhistorical when it could simply be the addition of another source or perspective.
4. There has also been a tendency to overemphasize only what an author has modified as being the important aspects of his theology (even though such modifications are usually peripheral to the message) but to ignore the possible importance of those things that he has preserved.
5. Sometimes, redaction critics make too much out of minor differences in detail. Is every instance of omission or addition of material theologically driven? It could very well be from reasons like a lack or surplus of information, an omission for the sake of brevity and fluidity, or an addition for clarity or background information.

== See also ==
- Historical criticism

== Resources ==
- Gunther Bornkamm, Gerhard Barth and Heinz Joachim Held, Tradition and Interpretation in Matthew (1963).
- Hans Conzelmann, Theology of St Luke (1960)
- Willi Marxsen, Mark the Evangelist: Studies on the Redaction History of the Gospel (1969).
- Norman Perrin, What is Redaction Criticism? Philadelphia: Fortress Press, 1969.
