= Günther Bornkamm =

German theologian (1905–1990)

- Born: 8 October 1905; Görlitz, German Empire
- Died: 18 February 1990 (aged 84); Heidelberg, West Germany

Academic background
- Doctoral advisor: Rudolf Bultmann

Academic work
- Discipline: Biblical studies
- Sub-discipline: New Testament
- Institutions: University of Königsberg; University of Göttingen; Heidelberg University
- Doctoral students: Dieter Georgi

Günther Bornkamm (8 October 1905 – 18 February 1990) was a German New Testament scholar belonging to the school of Rudolf Bultmann and a Professor of New Testament at the University of Heidelberg. Under Adolf Hitler, he opposed the nazification of the Protestant churches and their unification into the movement of the 'German Christians'. His post-war fame as a scholar rested on his effort to separate fiction from facts in his reconstruction of Jesus' life and in his subsequent treatment of the gospel of Matthew. His brother was the ecclesiastical historian and Luther scholar Heinrich Bornkamm.

== Biography ==
Bornkamm was a student of Rudolf Bultmann with Ernst Käsemann (Tübingen), Ernst Fuchs (Marburg) and Hans Conzelmann (Göttingen). He developed his studies in Tübingen, Marburg and Göttingen. In 1934 he was appointed professor at the University of Königsberg, but in 1937 the Nazis withdrew his venia legendi and he had to stop lecturing. He was a pastor in Münster and Dortmund before he was forced, in 1943, to join the Wehrmacht.

From 1947 to 1949 Bornkamm was a professor at the University of Göttingen from 1949 to 1971 and professor of New Testament at the University of Heidelberg. He was also a member of the Confederation of Köngener (Bund der Köngener), a German youth organization created in 1920 out of groups of Protestant Bible circles and disbanded by the Nazi dictatorship in 1934. (Note: See also Wandervogel; Poewe & Hexham 2003.)

Günther Bornkamm was a proponent of the Second Quest for the Historical Jesus (following the Period of "No Quest" of Albert Schweitzer). (Note: Bornkamm wrote that Schweitzer, in his classic work, The Quest of the Historical Jesus, had erected its memorial, but at the same time had delivered its funeral oration.) He suggested a tighter relationship between Jesus and the theology of the early church (in contrast to the 'First' and 'No Quest' periods ending in 1953). Numbered among his opponents, Rudolf Bultmann argued for a divorce between the two, but their approaches remain similar in many aspects.

In his book Jesus von Nazareth (1956), (Note: Published in the English translation as Jesus of Nazareth in 1960, by Hodder & Stoughton Ltd, as prepared by I. & F. McLuskey, with J. M. Robinson.) Bornkamm expressed the profound difficulties of researching the historical Jesus and wished to produce a work that would inform not only professional theologians on the many questions, uncertainties, and findings of historical research, but also the laymen who would wish, so far as possible, to arrive at an historical understanding of the tradition about Jesus and should not be content with edifying or romantic portrayals. He also stated that everyone was so familiar with the Nazarene through Christian tradition, and yet at the same time this very tradition had become strange and unintelligible to many. He affirmed:

If the journey into this often misty country is to succeed, then the first requirement is the readiness for free and frank questioning, and the renunciation of an attitude which simply seeks the confirmation of its own judgements arising from a background of belief or of unbelief.

The work by Ernst Käsemann is also valuable for understanding Bornkamm's work.

== Works ==
- Bornkamm, Günther; Klaas, Walter (1951). Mythos und Evangelium. Theologische Existenz heute. Vol. 26. München: Kaiser. OCLC 12630562.
- ——— (1960). Jesus of Nazareth (trans from Jesus von Nazareth). New York: Evanston Harper & Row. OCLC 721209186. - (trans pub by Stuttgart: Europa-Verlag in 1956)
- ———; Barth, Gerhard; Held, Heinz Joachim (1963). Tradition and Interpretation in Matthew (trans from Überlieferung und Aulegung im Matthäusevangelim). New Testament library. Philadelphia, PA: Westminster Press. ISBN 9780664204532. OCLC 383441.
- ——— (1969). Paul (trans from Paulus). London: Hodder & Stoughton. ISBN 9780340197615. OCLC 827621337. - (trans pub by Stuttgart: Kohlhammer Verlag in 1969)
- ——— (1973). The New Testament: A Guide to Its Writings (trans from Bibel, das Neue Testament). Philadelphia, PA: Fortress Press. ISBN 9780800601683. OCLC 692446. - (trans pub by Stuttgart: Kreuz-Verlag in 1971)
- ———; Hammer, Paul Leland (1974). Early Christian experience (trans from Studien zu Antike und Urchristentum and Das Ende des Gesetzes). New Testament library. London: SCM Press. ISBN 9780334003472. OCLC 16236676. - (trans by Munich: Kaiser Verlag in 1963 and 1966)
- ———; Wolff, Hans Walter (1980). Zugang zur Bibel: eine Einführung in die Schriften des Alten und Neuen Testaments. Themen der Theologie, Bd. 7 u. 9. Stuttgart: Kreuz-Verlag. ISBN 9783783106138. OCLC 844919595.
- ——— (1985). Studien zum Neuen Testament. München: Kaiser. ISBN 9783459016129. OCLC 13152615.
- ———; Zager, Hrsg. von Werner (2009). Studien zum Matthäus-Evangelium. Wissenschaftliche Monographien zum Alten und Neuen Testament. Vol. 125. Neukirchen-Vluyn: Neukirchener Verlag. ISBN 978-3-7887-2365-1. OCLC 463790281.
