= Eberhard Jüngel =

German Lutheran theologian (1934–2021)

- Born: 5 December 1934; Magdeburg, Saxony, Prussia, Germany
- Died: 28 September 2021 (aged 86); Tübingen, Baden-Württemberg, Germany
- Awards: Pour le Mérite for Sciences and Arts; Order of Merit of the Federal Republic of Germany

Academic background
- Education: Theologisches Konvikt Berlin; University of Zürich; University of Basel
- Doctoral advisor: Ernst Fuchs
- Influences: Gerhard Ebeling; Heinrich Vogel; Karl Barth; Martin Heidegger

Academic work
- Discipline: Theology
- Sub-discipline: Systematic Theology; Hermeneutical Theology
- School or tradition: Lutheranism
- Institutions: Theologisches Konvikt Berlin; University of Tübingen; Evangelisches Stift Tübingen

Eberhard Jüngel (5 December 1934 – 28 September 2021) was a German Lutheran theologian. He was Emeritus Professor of Systematic Theology and the Philosophy of Religion at the Faculty of Protestant Theology of the University of Tübingen.

== Life and work ==
Jüngel was born in Magdeburg on 5 December 1934 as the son of the electrician Kurt Jüngel and his wife Margarete née Rothemann, into a non-religious home. After World War II, Magdeburg was located in the German Democratic Republic (GDR). He remembered that his decision to pursue a career in theology was met with "the concerned astonishment" of his mother and "the resolute refusal" of his father.' However, it was precisely the communist milieu of his youth which led him to Christian theology: "That was the discovery of the church as the one place within a Stalinist society where one could speak the truth without being penalized."

Jüngel studied undergraduate theology at the Theologisches Konvikt Berlin (Theological Seminary of East Berlin). During this time he was particularly interested in the works of Ernst Fuchs and Heinrich Vogel, who influenced his work throughout his life. He concluded his undergraduate theological studies in Switzerland in 1957 and 1958, working with Gerhard Ebeling at the University of Zürich, and attending Karl Barth's seminars at the University of Basel and Martin Heidegger's lectures (eventually published as "Unterwegs zur Sprache"). In 1961, he completed his doctorate supervised by Fuchs on Paulus und Jesus. Eine Untersuchung zur Präzisierung der Frage nach dem Ursprung der Christologie (Paulus and Jesus. An investigation to clarify the question of the origin of Christology). He completed his habilitation in systematic theology in 1962 at the Kirchliche Hochschule Berlin-Ost.

In 1962, as a direct result of the erection of the Berlin Wall, Jüngel was appointed to the position of Dozent für Neues Testament (Lecturer in New Testament) in the Hochschule, a position he retained until 1966. At the end of his tenure at the Hochschule, Jüngel was appointed Ordinarius für Systematische Theologie und Dogmengeschichte (Professor of systematic theology and history of dogmatics) at the University of Zürich, where he taught until 1969. Moving to West Germany in 1969, Jüngel accepted a position of Ordinarius für Systematische Theologie und Religionsphilosophie (Professor of Systematic Theology and Philosophy of Religion) at the University of Tübingen, where he also assumed the role of director of the Institute for Hermeneutics. Despite a plethora of offers for positions at other universities, Jüngel remained at Tübingen until his retirement in 2003. His successor was the systematic theologian Christoph Schwöbel.

Jüngel held a number of additional positions throughout his academic career:

- Between 1987 and 2005, he was Ephorus (Director) of Evangelisches Stift Tübingen, a Protestant house of studies and teaching founded in 1536 in a former Augustinian monastery. He was succeeded in 2005 by the Theologian and Church Historian Volker Henning Drecoll.
- From 2003 to 2006, he was the director of the Forschungsstätte der Evangelischen Studiengemeinschaft (Research Centre for Protestant Studies) in Heidelberg.
- In 2007, he was appointed the Gadamer-Stiftungsprofessor (Hans-Georg Gadamer Chair in Theology) at the University of Heidelberg.

He was a member of the Norwegian Academy of Science and Letters, also Chancellor of the Order Pour le Mérite for Sciences and Arts, and a member of the Synod of the Protestant Church in Germany. In 1994, he received the Knight Commander's Cross of the Order of Merit of the Federal Republic of Germany and in 2000 the Medal of Merit of the State of Baden-Württemberg. Jüngel received honorary doctorates from the University of Greifswald and from the University of Basel.

Jüngel died in Tübingen on 28 September 2021.

== Theology ==
Main features of Jüngel's theology (Evolution and inner consistency):

1. Paul and Jesus – Jüngel's thesis deals with the issues arising from the interpretation of the New Testament
2. God's being is in becoming – His first book in the area of dogmatic theology
3. Christology: exegesis and dogmatics – Understanding of the relationship between the historical and the dogmatic in Christology
4. God the mystery of the world: speaking about God, thinking about God, the human god
5. Atheism and the theology of death – His response to atheism, and his theology of death
6. Anthropology and justification – Relation between God and man
7. Anthropology and analogy – The man who expresses God
8. Towards a theology of the natural – Confrontation of the Christian faith with the contemporary experience of reality

== Bibliography ==
German works

- Gott als Geheimnis der Welt: Zur Begründung der Theologie des Gekreuzigten im Streit zwischen Theismus und Atheismus, Mohr Siebeck, 1982. ISBN 978-3-16-150389-4

Translation into English

- Christ, Justice and Peace: Toward a Theology of the State in Dialogue with the Barmen Declaration (ET 1992, translated by Alan Torrance and D. Bruce Hamill). ISBN 978-0-567-65978-1
- Death: The Riddle and the Mystery (ET 1975). OCLC 718335245
- The Freedom of a Christian: Luther's Significance for Contemporary Theology (ET 1988). ISBN 978-0-8066-2393-1
- God as the Mystery of the World: On the Foundation of the Theology of the Crucified One in the Dispute between Theism and Atheism (ET 1983). ISBN 978-0-567-65983-5
- God's Being Is in Becoming: The Trinitarian Being of God in the Theology of Karl Barth – A Paraphrase (ET 2001); ISBN 978-0-567-07994-7 previously translated as The Doctrine of the Trinity (ET 1976). ISBN 978-0-7073-0115-0
- "The Gospel and the Protestant Churches of Europe: Christian Responsibility for Europe from a Protestant Perspective," in Religion, State and Society 21:2 (1993), pp. 137–149. OCLC 4637184266
- Justification: The Heart of the Christian Faith (ET 2001). ISBN 978-0-567-08775-1
- Karl Barth: A Theological Legacy (ET 1986). OCLC 1239790389
- "On the Doctrine of Justification" in the International Journal of Systematic Theology 1:1 (1999), pp. 24–52. OCLC 5155533887
- "Sermon on Matthew 25:1–12" in Toronto Journal of Theology 18:1 (Spring 2002), pp. 13–19. OCLC 4960240225
- Theological Essays I (ET 1989). ISBN 978-0-567-69092-0
- Theological Essays II (ET 1994). ISBN 978-0-567-65987-3
- "Theses on the Relation of the Existence, Essence and Attributes of God" in Toronto Journal of Theology 17 (2001), pp. 55–74. OCLC 5133209842
- "To tell the world about God: The task for the mission of the church on the threshold of the third millennium" in International Review of Mission (30 April 2000). OCLC 5153912553
