= TVZ Theologischer Verlag Zürich AG =

- Founded: 15 July 1938
- Country of origin: Switzerland
- Headquarters location: Zürich
- Nonfiction topics: Protestant Church of Switzerland
- Official website: tvz-verlag.ch

TVZ Theologischer Verlag Zürich AG is a Swiss book and magazine publisher of materials for Continental Reformed Protestantism based in Zurich.

== History ==
The current company was entered in the commercial register on August 24, 1945; however, the publishing history begins in 1833, when the Evangelical Reformed Church of the Canton of Zürich set up a youth library for apprentices in Zürich. This led to the creation of an evangelical bookstore in 1840. In 1934, a publishing house, Zwingli Verlag, was added to the bookstore. The company was called Evangelische Buchhandlung & Zwingli-Verlag AG and later became a GmbH, a limited liability company. At the same time, the Evangelische Verlag Zollikon or EVZ was founded in 1935, which published the work of the theologian and scholar Karl Barth, who was dismissed from Bonn in the same year.

The Zwingli publishing house, which had already absorbed the theological publisher Verlag Flamberg, and the EVZ merged in 1970 to form the TVZ. However, the planned expansion failed, and new share capital had to be obtained in 1976. Since then, the Evangelical Reformed Church of the Canton of Zürich has been the principal owner.

Almost thirty years later, in 2003, the Pano publishing house came under the wing of the TVZ. The NZN Buchverlag was founded in 1946 to publish collections of articles and essays from the Catholic daily newspaper Neue Zürcher Nachrichten and quickly became an internationally renowned art book publisher. In 1972, it came to the Roman Catholic regional church of the canton of Zurich, which continued to run it independently until 2005. Since then, its program has been continued as the Catholic Reihen der Edition NZN bei TVZ under the wing of the Protestant Theological Publishing House Zurich. With the integration of Edition NZN, the publisher sent a strong ecumenical signal.

As early as 1972, the TVZ and the Catholic RCL Benziger published the ecumenical religious education journal RL. Zeitschrift für Religion und Lebenskunde. From 2008, the magazine was known under the title Zeitschrift für Religionsunterricht, but it had to be discontinued at the end of 2013 for economic reasons.

== Publishing program ==
In addition to Karl Barth's complete works, the publishing house also publishes the journals Zwingliana and Zeitschrift für Religionsunterricht und Lebenskunde.

The publishing house is the "most traditional Reformed publisher in Switzerland for theological and Christian literature of all educational levels." It is known beyond the country's borders. In 2003, the TVZ took over Pano Verlag, which publishes works on cultural and religious studies, and in 2005, the NZN Buchverlag, which specializes in theology, pastoral care, law, and the history of the Catholic Church in Switzerland.

The focus of the publishing program is on four areas:

- Religious epistemology, church history, and classics editions of authors like Zwingli, Heinrich Bullinger, and Barth
- Books for church life
- Christian literature for a general reading public
- Religious education (theory and practice).

TVZ Verlags AG publishes printed and digital books. Ebooks are available in ePub format or PDF.

== Authors (selection) ==
- Karl Barth
- Fritz Blanke
- Emil Brunner
- Emidio Campi
- Ulrich Gäbler
- Peter Opitz
- Ruedi Reich
- Regine Schindler
