= Signs Gospel =

Hypothetical gospel account of the life of Jesus Christ

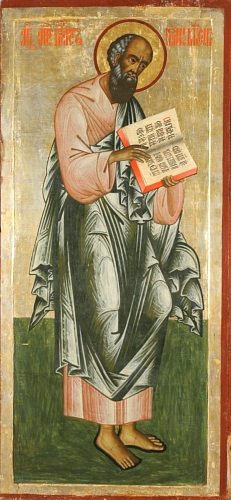
Russian Orthodox icon of the Apostle and Evangelist John the Theologian, 18th century (Iconostasis of Transfiguration Church, Kizhi Monastery, Karelia, Russia)

The Signs Gospel or the semeia source is a hypothetical gospel account of the life of Jesus Christ which some scholars have suggested could have been a primary source document for the Gospel of John. This theory has its basis in source criticism. After the commentary of Rudolf Bultmann was published in 1941, the hypothesis of a semeia (sign or miracle) source was supported by those who favor Johannine independence from the synoptic Gospels, but scholars today agree that the existence of a single signs source for the miracles in John is highly unlikely.

== Internal evidence ==
Paul Anderson argues that John "is the source" of the Johannine tradition but "not the final writer of the tradition." Such scholars posit numerous authors whose authorship has been absorbed into the gospel's development over a period of time and in several stages. However, scholars increasingly describe John as a unitary text and have abandoned models with hypothetical sources and stages. Most scholars during the twentieth century viewed John as a communal work written in multiple editions, but this position is currently in retreat, and there has been a decrease in arguing for the existence of hypothetical sources behind the Gospel of John in scholarship.

== Bultmann ==
The hypothesis of the Gospel of John being composed in layers over a period of time originated in the work of Rudolf Bultmann in 1941. Bultmann suggested that the author(s) of John depended in part on an author who wrote an earlier account. This hypothetical "Signs Gospel" listing Christ's miracles was independent of, and not used by, the synoptic gospels. It was believed to have been circulating before the year 70 AD. Bultmann's conclusion was so controversial that heresy proceedings were instituted against him and his writings.

== Later scholarship ==
Nevertheless, this hypothesis has not disappeared. Scholars such as Raymond E. Brown believe the original author of the Signs Gospel to be the Beloved Disciple. They argue that the disciple who formed this community was both a historical person and a companion of Jesus Christ. Brown also suggests that the Beloved Disciple had been a follower of John the Baptist before joining Jesus. However, there has been an increase in support for John's knowledge of the Synoptics, and the signs source hypothesis is in decline. Most scholars today agree that the existence of a single signs source for the miracles in John is highly unlikely. Opposition to the existence of a "signs gospel" is clearly dominant in 21st century scholarship.

== Robert T. Fortna ==
Robert Fortna, a member of the Jesus Seminar, argued that there are at least two distinct writing styles contained in the Gospel of John. The later style contains highly developed and sophisticated midrash and theological essays attached superficially—even "mechanically" at some points—to the former source. The other—earlier—style is the original 2-part Signs Gospel, consisting of a Signs Source (SQ) and a Passion Source (PQ). It is simple, direct and historical in style and can be roughly reconstructed as follows:

- John the Baptist (1:6-7,19-49)
- Water into wine (2:1-11)
- Healing the royal official's son (2:12a,4:46b-54)
- Catch of 153 fish (21:1-14)
- Feeding 5000 (6:1-14)
- Walking on water (6:15-25)
- Raising of Lazarus (11:1-45)
- Healing the man blind from birth (9:1-8)
- Healing at the Pool of Bethesda (5:2-9)
- Plot to kill Jesus (11:47-53)
- Temple incident (2:14-19)
- Jewish rejection (12:37-40)
- Mary anoints Jesus (12:1-8)
- Entering Jerusalem (12:12-15)
- Arrest (18:1-11)
- Before the High Priest (18:12-27)
- Before Pilate (18:28-19:16a)
- Crucifixion (19:16b-37)
- Joseph of Arimathea (19:38-42)
- Empty tomb (20:1-10)
- Do not hold on to me (20:11-18)
- Great Commission (20:19-22)
- Conclusion (20:30-31ab)

The order of the signs in the Gospel of John is different from their order in the reconstructed Signs Gospel. In the Signs Gospel, they are presented in a geographically logical order, going from Galilee to Jerusalem. In the Gospel of John, they have been rearranged to reflect Jesus' repeated movements to and from Jerusalem. This would explain some of the geographical difficulties in the Gospel of John, such as the sudden shift from Judaea to Galilee in John 6:1.

== See also ==
- List of Gospels
