= Ernst Käsemann =

German theologian (1906–1998)

- Born: 12 July 1906; Bochum
- Died: 17 February 1998 (aged 91); Tübingen
- Occupation: Professor of New Testament
- Known for: New Quest for the Historical Jesus

Academic background
- Education: University of Marburg (PhD)
- Doctoral advisor: Rudolf Bultmann

Academic work
- Institutions: Mainz; Göttingen; Tübingen
- Notable works: commentary on the Epistle to the Romans
- Notable ideas: double criterion of difference on the reliability of the synoptic gospels

Ernst Käsemann (12 July 1906 – 17 February 1998) was a German Lutheran theologian and professor of New Testament in Mainz (1946–1951), Göttingen (1951–1959) and Tübingen (1959–1971).

== Study and work ==
Käsemann was born in Bochum. He obtained his PhD in New Testament at the University of Marburg in 1931, having written a dissertation on Pauline ecclesiology, with Rudolf Bultmann as his doctoral supervisor. Käsemann was one of Bultmann's more well-known politically left-of-centre pupils.

Käsemann joined the Confessing Church movement in 1933; in the same year, he was appointed pastor in Gelsenkirchen, in a district populated mainly by miners. During the autumn of 1937 he spent a few weeks in Gestapo detention for publicly supporting communist miners.

During 1939, he completed his habilitation, which qualified him to teach upper level seminars and advise graduate students at German universities; his dissertation was on the New Testament Epistle to the Hebrews.

Käsemann was later drafted as a soldier. He returned to his theological work in 1946 after several years in the army and as a prisoner of war.

Käsemann was involved with what is known as the 'New Quest for the historical Jesus', a new phase of scholarly interest in working out what could possibly be ascertained historically about Jesus. Käsemann effectively started this phase when he published his famous article "The Problem of the Historical Jesus" during 1954, originally his inaugural lecture as Professor in Göttingen in 1951.

Käsemann developed what became known as the double criterion of difference in evaluating the historical reliability of the synoptic gospels. Put simply, what is historically reliable about Jesus can be deduced from material about Jesus which is neither plausible in a first-century Jewish nor an early Christian context. In addition to this, he proposed additional criteria, such as multiple attestation (does a particular story or saying of Jesus appear in independent traditions?) and coherence with other material already found to be reliable historical traditions about Jesus. Only the recent 'third quest' for the historical Jesus, which began in the later 1980s, began to question the absolute validity of these criteria.

Käsemann also began to take Jewish apocalypticism more seriously than most of his contemporary colleagues and thought it to be of vital significance for a reading of Paul. Indeed, he famously described apocalypticism as "the mother of Christian theology". Käsemann's commentary on Paul's Epistle to the Romans, first published in 1973, became a standard work for that generation.

His daughter, Elisabeth Käsemann, who had become a revolutionary while living in Argentina, was abducted by security forces during the Dirty War, tortured, and subsequently 'disappeared'. It is thought that her murder took place around 24 May 1977. Ernst Käsemann's subsequent theological writings acquired a more radical, often bitter edge after his daughter's death.

Ernst Käsemann received honorary doctorates from the universities of Marburg, Durham, Edinburgh, Oslo and Yale.

He died on 17 February 1998 in Tübingen.

== Books by Ernst Käsemann (in English) ==
- Essays on New Testament Themes. London, SCM, 1964.
- The Testament of Jesus: A Study of the Gospel of John in Light of Chapter 17. London, SCM, 1968.
- New Testament Questions of Today. London, SCM, 1969.
- Jesus Means Freedom: A Polemical Survey of the New Testament. London, SCM, 1969.
- Perspectives on Paul. London, SCM, 1971.
- Commentary on Romans. London, SCM, 1980.
- The Wandering People of God. Minneapolis, Augsburg, 1984.
- On Being a Disciple of the Crucified Nazarene. Grand Rapids, Eerdmans, 2010.

== Literature about Ernst Käsemann ==
- Way, D V 1991. The Lordship of Christ: Ernst Käsemann's Interpretation of Paul's Theology. Oxford.
- Zahl, Paul F M 1996. Die Rechtfertigungslehre Ernst Käsemanns. Calwer Verlag.
- Osborn, E F 1999. Käsemann, Ernst. In: Hayes, J H (ed) Dictionary of Biblical Interpretation Vol. 2, Nashville: Abingdon, pages 14–16.
- Harrisville, R A & Sundberg, W. Käsemann, Ernst. In: The Bible in Modern Culture: Theology and Historical Critical Method from Spinoza to Käsemann. Grand Rapids: Eerdmans, pages 238–261.

== See also ==
- Rudolf Bultmann
- Günther Bornkamm
- Michael Lattke
- On the Kairos Document
