= Johannes Blauw =

Dutch Reformed theologian (1912–2007)

- Born: July 10, 1912
- Died: December 12, 2007 (aged 95)
- Occupation: Theologian
- Notable work: The Missionary Nature of the Church

Johannes Blauw (1912–2007) was a Dutch Reformed theologian known for his contributions to the field of biblical studies and hermeneutics. He played a significant role in the development of a hermeneutical approach known as the new hermeneutic, which emerged in the mid-20th century.

== Early life ==
Blauw was born on July 10, 1912 in the Netherlands. He studied theology at the Free University of Amsterdam, where he earned his doctorate in theology in 1937. After completing his studies, he served as a minister in the Dutch Reformed Church. In 1950, Blauw's Phd was republished in the form of a book, titled Goden En Mensen: Plaats En Betekenis Van De Heidenen In De Heilige Schrift ("Gods and Men: The Place and Significance of Pagans in Holy Scripture" in English.)

== Career ==
Blauw's work in hermeneutics focused on the interpretation of the Bible in the context of the modern world. He was critical of overly rationalistic approaches to biblical interpretation and sought to emphasize the importance of understanding the cultural and historical context of the biblical texts. His ideas were part of a broader movement in theology that sought to engage more deeply with the existential and cultural challenges of the time. One of Blauw's influential works is "The Missionary Nature of the Church: A Survey of the Biblical Theology of Mission." In this book, he explored the biblical foundations for mission and emphasized the missional nature of the church as reflected in the Bible. Johannes Blauw's impact extended beyond his academic work; he also served as a pastor and contributed to the practical aspects of theology. In 1963, Blauw presented a report on behalf of the World Council of Churches.

Blauw died on December 12, 2007. While the new hermeneutic and its proponents have faced both criticism and support, Blauw's work remains an important part of the conversation around biblical interpretation and theology.

== See also ==
- Dutch theologians
- New hermeneutic
