= Hans Conzelmann =

German theologian and New Testament scholar (1915–1989)

- Born: 27 October 1915; Tailfingen, Kingdom of Württemberg
- Died: 20 June 1989 (aged 73); Göttingen, Germany
- Occupation: Professor of New Testament at the University of Göttingen

Academic background
- Education: Tübingen, Marburg
- Alma mater: Heidelberg University (Ph.D.)
- Influences: Hans von Soden; Rudolf Bultmann

Academic work
- Era: Mid 20th century
- Discipline: Biblical studies and Theology
- Sub-discipline: NT studies
- Institutions: Heidelberg University; University of Zurich; University of Göttingen
- Notable works: Die Mitte Der Zeit
- Notable ideas: theological concept known as Heilsgeschichte

Hans Conzelmann (27 October 1915 – 20 June 1989) was a Protestant, German theologian and New Testament scholar.

== Life ==
Conzelmann studied at the universities of Tübingen and Marburg (where he was influenced by Hans von Soden and Rudolf Bultmann) and, after World War II (in which he was severely wounded), he became the assistant to Helmut Thielicke at the University of Tübingen. He served at the same time as a pastor and, from 1948, as a religion teacher in a secondary school. In 1951 he submitted his dissertation and, in 1952, his Habilitation (Dr. habil.) at Heidelberg University. He then took a position teaching New Testament at Heidelberg and was called, in 1954, to the University of Zurich, where he was made full professor in 1956. In 1960 he was called to be Professor of New Testament at the University of Göttingen, where he remained until his retirement in 1978.

== Work ==
One of Conzelmann's major works was Die Mitte der Zeit (Tübingen 1954), literally 'The Middle of Time', which was translated into English under the title, The Theology of St. Luke. This work, which approached Lukan theology by way of Redaction Criticism, paved the way for much scholarly discussion in the second half of the twentieth century. Conzelmann, along with other post-Bultmannian scholars, challenged the view that Jesus was an apocalyptic figure, but rather focused on the message of Christ as the kingdom of God breaking into the present. This was a challenge to the portrait of Jesus as expecting an imminent eschaton.

Conzelmann contends that Jesus' teaching about eschatology is unconnected to his words about God and ethics.

== Concept of Salvation History ==
Perhaps Conzelmann's main contribution to the study of Luke's Gospel was his contention that Luke changed the emphasis in Jesus' teaching from an expectation that he (Jesus) would return shortly after his death, resurrection and ascension (a belief in the imminent parousia) to seeing God at work in history and therefore that the early Christians needed to find ways of living as disciples of Christ 'in the long haul' through history. This theological emphasis was called Heilsgeschichte (usually translated into English as "Salvation History").

Conzelmann thought that history could be divided into three eras:
1. the Old Testament period (up to and including John the Baptist)
2. the period of Jesus' earthly ministry (which Conzelmann said was free from interference from Satan)
3. the era of the Church.

These details have been challenged by later scholars - for example by asking where John the Baptist most accurately fits and if the life of Jesus really was a 'Satan free zone'.

== Select publications ==
Conzelmann was the author (together with Andreas Lindemann) of the standard introduction to the New Testament in the German-speaking world: the Arbeitsbuch zum Neuen Testament.

- Conzelmann, Hans (1954). Die Mitte der Zeit: Studien zur Theologie des Lukas. Tübingen: Mohr. OCLC 164809599. - (trans in English as The Theology of St. Luke London: Faber and Faber, 1960)
- ———; Lindemann, Andreas (1967). Grundriß der Theologie des Neuen Testaments. Einführung in die Evangelische Theologie. Vol. 2. München: Chr. Kaiser Verlag. OCLC 883527337. - (trans in English as An Outline of the Theology of the New Testament London: SCM Press, 1969)
- ———; Lindemann, Andreas (1975). Arbeitsbuch zum Neuen Testament. UTB für Wissenschaft: Uni-Taschenbücher. Vol. 52. Tübingen: J.C.B. Mohr. ISBN 9783161322914. OCLC 610880451. - (trans in English as Interpreting the New Testament: an introduction to the principles and methods of N.T. exegesis Peabody, MA: Hendrickson, 1988)
