= New hermeneutic =

Theory of biblical interpretation

New hermeneutic is the theory and methodology of interpretation (hermeneutics) to understand biblical texts through existentialism.

== Background ==
The essence of new hermeneutic emphasizes not only the existence of language but also the fact that language is eventualized in the history of individual life. This is called the event of language. Ernst Fuchs, Gerhard Ebeling, and James M. Robinson are the scholars who represent the new hermeneutics. And it is said that language event (German: Sprachereignis, the word event) occurs continuously, not that the interpreter insists on the text, but the text continually asserts the interpreter. Fuchs' concern is not to ask for the meaning of the text, but to learn how to listen to unobtrusive language about human beings' existence according to the hermeneutical help given with the text itself. Fuchs' achievement lay in bringing the insights of Karl Barth, Rudolf Bultmann, and Martin Heidegger into fruitful conjunction. He sought to bridge Barth's Calvinist emphasis on the revealed Word of God with Rudolf Bultmann's Lutheran emphasis on the nature of human existence before God by employing a phenomenology of language derived in part from Heidegger's later position, arguing that both human existence and the being of God are ultimately linguistic - made available in language - and that theology is thus properly "faith's doctrine of language" (German: Sprachlehre des Glaubens).

Theology's task is essentially hermeneutical, i.e., theology translates Scripture into contemporary terms and contemporary existence into scriptural terms. Fuchs' interest is language event with existential philosophy. Conversely, the reality of God's love is verbalized in Jesus' word and deeds recorded in the Gospels and is thus preserved as language gain (German: Sprachgewinn). In the freedom of proclamation God's presence in the gospel and the "Yes of love: happens again - that is, comes to be as language, opening up the future to authentic existence (faith, hope, and love).

== Scholarship ==
Theologians such as Cornelius Van Til were strong opponents of New hermeneutics whereas Johannes Blauw was a proponent of New hermeneutics. Blauw's work, for example, focused on the interpretation of the Bible in the context of the modern world although he was critical of overly rationalistic approaches to biblical interpretation and sought to emphasize the importance of understanding the cultural and historical context of the biblical texts. His ideas were part of a broader movement in theology that sought to engage more deeply with the existential and cultural challenges of the time. But Cornelius Van Til, based on the Reformed tradition, took a critical stance towards the New Hermeneutics. Van Til believed that the New Hermeneutics, by introducing human-centered perspectives and existentialist philosophy into biblical interpretation, undermined the absolute authority of Scripture and subordinated God's revelation to human experience.

== Bibliography ==
- Cornelius Van Til (1974), The New Hermeneutic.
