= Elisabeth Käsemann =

German sociologist and freedom fighter (1947–1977)

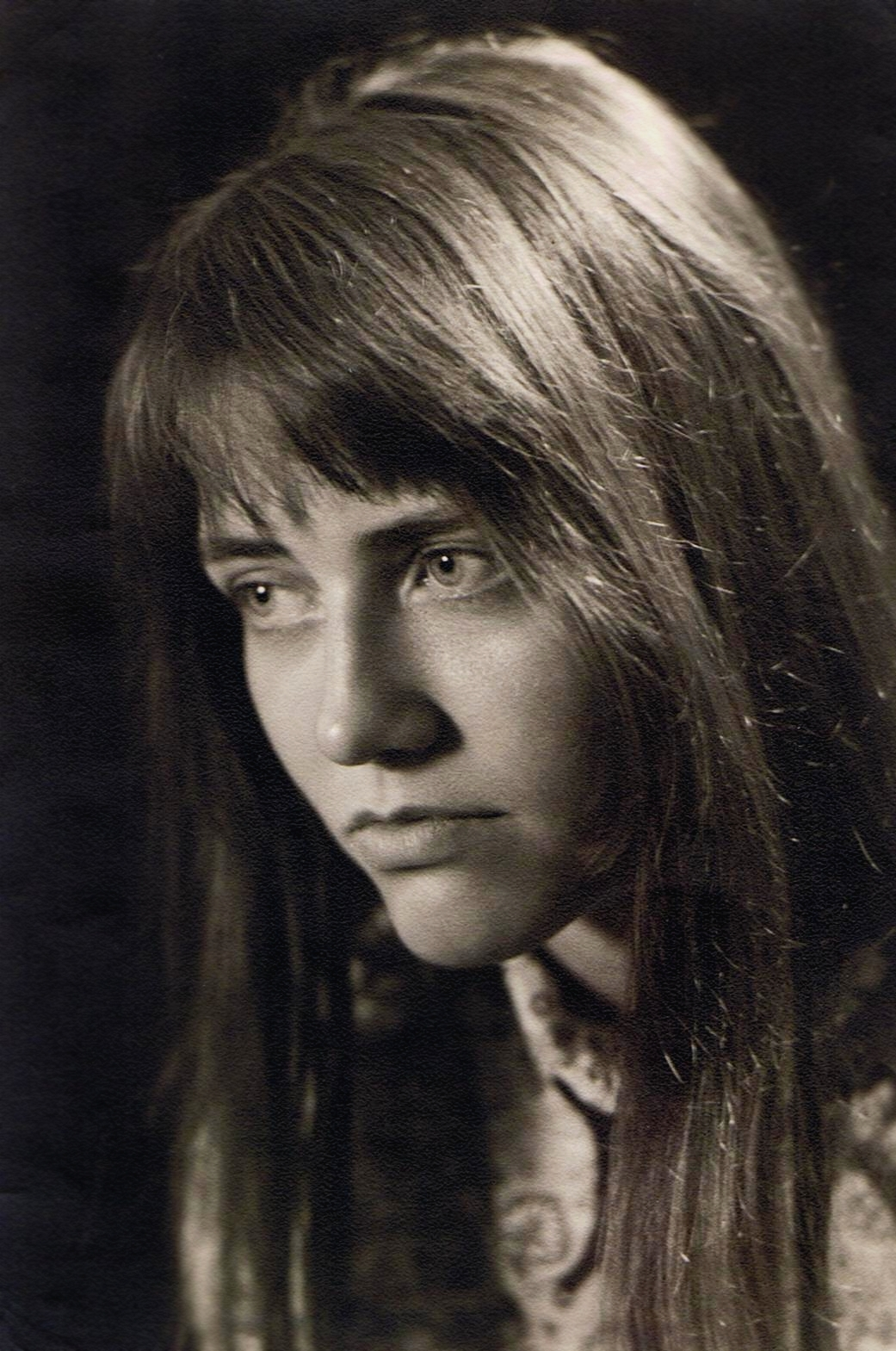
- Käsemann in 1974 or 1975
- Born: May 11, 1947; Gelsenkirchen, West Germany
- Died: May 24, 1977 (aged 30); Monte Grande, Buenos Aires Province, Argentina
- Burial place: Tübingen, West Germany
- Education: University of Oxford; Freie Universität Berlin; University of Buenos Aires; University of Tübingen
- Father: Ernst Käsemann

Elisabeth Käsemann (11 May 1947 – 24 May 1977) was a West German sociologist killed in Argentina as part of the Dirty War.

== Life ==
Käsemann was born in Gelsenkirchen to Margit Käsemann and German theologian Ernst Käsemann. The family moved frequently in her childhood due to her father's work, living in Mainz, Göttingen, and Tübingen (beginning in 1959). She ran a "political study group" at Wildermuth High School, from which she graduated in 1966. She attended Oxford briefly on a language stay before going on to study politics at the Freie Universität Berlin beginning in late 1966. Her coursework required her to take a mandatory practical training semester, which she spent in Bolivia in 1968. There, she worked for the Evangelical Methodist Church in La Paz.

While studying and working in Bolivia, Käsemann toured Latin America and decided to study economics at the University of Buenos Aires. She also worked as a secretary and translator, and began to become involved with local political groups throughout 1968 and 1969. She also studied as a sociologist at Tübingen University.

In Argentina, Käsemann furthered literacy projects by teaching in poor neighborhoods.

Following the country's 1976 military coup, she worked to forge documents to help political targets escape the country. Käsemann was arrested for her work on 9 March 1977, having been discovered missing after she failed to meet an American friend. She was taken to El Vesubio torture camp in Monte Grande, where she was killed sometime in late May. Her body was recovered on 23 May with signs of "heavy torture" from electric shocks. According to a German autopsy, she had been killed "by several close-range bullet shots to her back and neck". Junta leaders initially reported that she had died "in a firefight during a standoff with terrorist guerillas".

She was buried in Tübingen in the summer of 1977.

== Political aftermath of Käsemann's killing ==
The German government faced criticism for their failure to secure Käsemann's release from Argentina. Germany issued warrants for Käsemann's killers in 2003.

In 2011, General Hector Gamen and Colonel Hugo Pascarelli, two men involved in the El Vesubio camp and Käsemann's killing, were given sentences of life in prison by Argentine courts.

== Legacy ==
Gelsenkirchen's family education center of the Protestant Church was named in Käsemann's honor in 1993. In 2005, after the center's building was closed, the entire, decentralized educational institution has been renamed "Elisabeth-Käsemann-Familienbildungsstätte".

In 2012, Wildermuth High School established the Elisabeth Käsemann Award for outstanding social commitment. That same year, a street in Tübingen's Lustnau district was also named in Käsemann's honor.

The Elisabeth Käsemann Foundation was established in 2014 by Käsemann's niece, Dorothee Weitbrecht. The organization focuses on German-Latin American relations and education surrounding totalitarian regimes.
