= Kerygma =

Greek word used in the New Testament for 'proclamation'

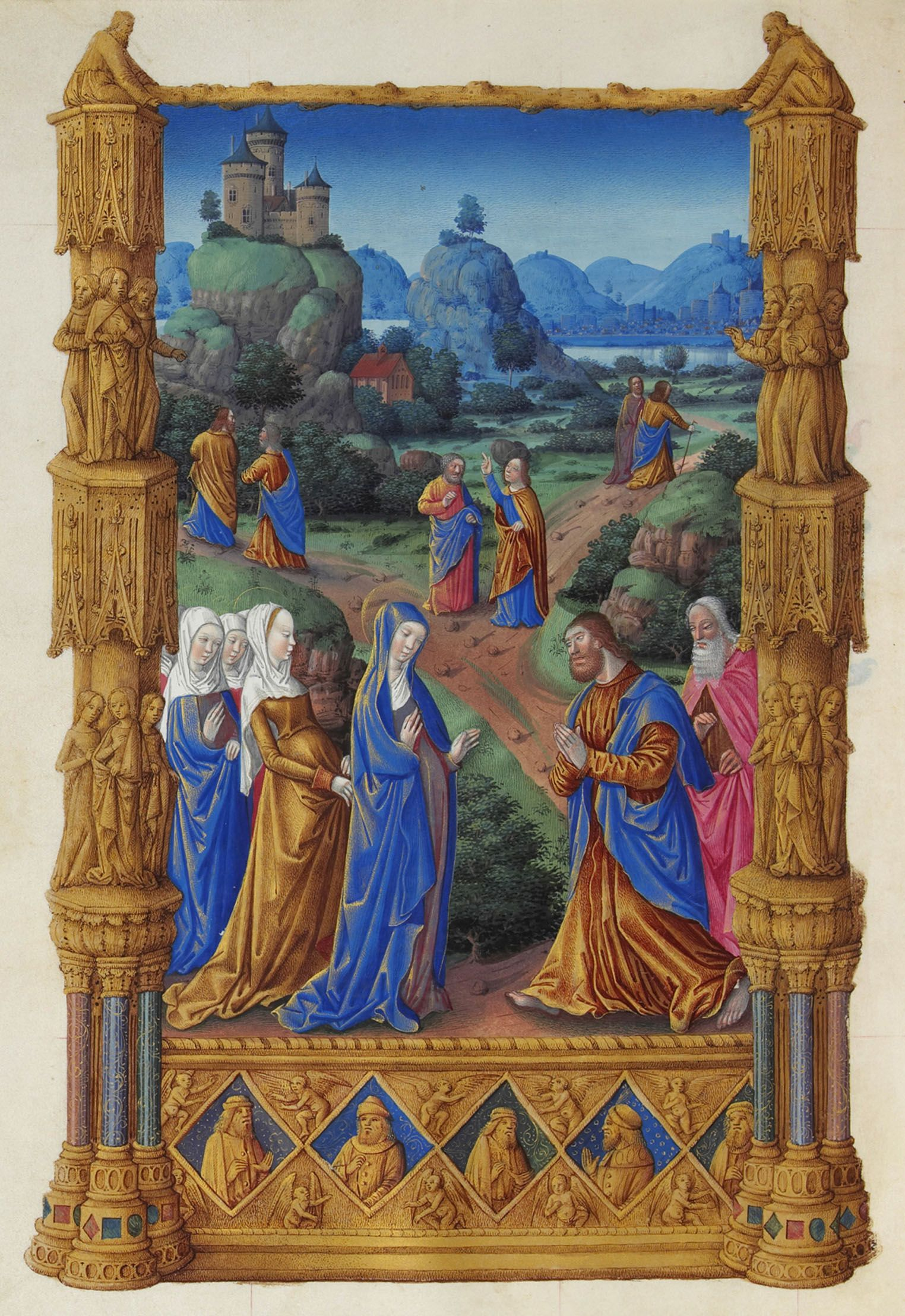
"The Apostles Going Forth to Preach" (Très Riches Heures du Duc de Berry, c. 1412–16)

Kerygma (from Ancient Greek: κήρυγμα, kḗrygma) is a Greek word used in the New Testament for 'proclamation' (see Luke 4:18-19, Romans 10:14, Gospel of Matthew 3:1). It is related to the Greek verb κηρύσσω (kērússō), literally meaning 'to cry or proclaim as a herald' and being used in the sense of 'to proclaim, announce, preach'. Amongst biblical scholars, the term has come to mean the core of the early church's teaching about Jesus.

The Catholic Church under Pope Francis strongly emphasized the importance of the kerygma as the center of all evangelization and work of renewal, formulating it as "Jesus loves us, died for us, is alive and near us", and extolling it as the wisest and truest proclamation and stating that "all Christian formation consists of entering more deeply into the kerygma."

== Origins in the New Testament and Early Church ==
In verbal form, the word appears around 61 times to describe the proclamation of the kingdom of God and of the ‘‘gospel of God, which he had promised beforehand through his prophets in the holy Scriptures’’ (Rom 1.2). The word Kerygma itself was used by the New Testament writers to refer to the manner in which an authorized preacher, ke¯rux (k≈rux), announced the truth that ‘‘the kingdom of God has come upon you’’ (Mt 12.28; Lk 11.20).

"Kerygmatic" is sometimes used to express the message of Jesus' whole ministry, as "a proclamation addressed not to the theoretical reason, but to the hearer as a self." This is distinguished from the didactic use of Scripture that seeks understanding in the light of what is taught. The meaning of the crucifixion is central to this concept.

Some key texts in the New Testament express this:

1. The promises of God made in the Old Testament have now been fulfilled with the coming of Jesus, the Messiah (Book of Acts 2:30; 3:19, 24, 10:43; 26:6-7, 22; Epistle to the Romans 1:2-4; 1 Timothy 3:16; Epistle to the Hebrews 1:1-2; 1 Peter 1:10-12; 2 Peter 1:18-19).
2. Jesus was anointed by God at his baptism as Messiah (Acts 10:38).
3. Jesus began his ministry in Galilee after his baptism (Acts 10:37), doing mighty works by the power of God (Mk 10:45; Acts 2:22; 10:38).
4. The Messiah was crucified according to the purpose of God (Mk 10:45; Jn 3:16; Acts 2:23; 3:13-15, 18; 4:11; 10:39; 26:23; Ro 8:34; 1 Corinthians 1:17-18; 15:3; Galatians 1:4; Heb 1:3; 1Peter 1:2, 19; 3:18; 1 Jn 4:10).
5. He was raised from the dead and appeared to his disciples (Acts 2:24, 31–32; 3:15, 26; 10:40-41; 17:31; 26:23; Ro 8:34; 10:9; 1Co 15:4-7, 12ff.; 1 Thessalonians 1:10; 1Tim 3:16; 1Peter 1:2, 21; 3:18, 21).
6. Jesus was exalted by God (Acts 2:25-29, 33–36; 3:13; Rom 8:34; 10:9; 1Tim 3:16; Heb 1:3; 1Peter 3:22) to be the Lord (Acts 10:36; Rom 10:9).
7. He will bring the Holy Spirit to form the new community of God (Ac 1:8; 2:14-18, 33, 38–39; 10:44-47; 1Peter 1:12).
8. He will come again for judgment and the restoration of all things (Ac 3:20-21; 10:42; 17:31; 1Co 15:20-28; 1Th 1:10).
9. All who hear the message should repent and be baptized (Ac 2:21, 38; 3:19; 10:43, 47–48; 17:30; 26:20; Ro 1:17; 10:9; 1Pe 3:21).

In the 4th century, the kerygma was formally published in the Nicene Creed.

== Theology on the Kerygma ==
During the mid-20th century, when the literary genre of the New Testament gospels was under debate, such scholars as C. H. Dodd and Rudolf Bultmann suggested that the gospels were of a genre unique in the ancient world. They called the genre kerygma and described it as a later development of preaching that had taken a literary form. Scholarship since then has found problems with Bultmann's theory, but in Biblical and theological discussions, the term kerygma has come to denote the irreducible essence of Christian apostolic proclamation.

The ancient Christian kerygma as summarized by Dodd from Peter's speeches in the New Testament Book of Acts was:

1. The Age of Fulfillment has dawned, the "latter days" foretold by the prophets.
2. This has taken place through the birth, life, ministry, death and resurrection of Jesus Christ.
3. By virtue of the resurrection, Jesus has been exalted at the right hand of God as Messianic head of the new Israel.
4. The Holy Spirit in the church is the sign of Christ's present power and glory.
5. The Messianic Age will reach its consummation in the return of Christ.
6. An appeal is made for repentance with the offer of forgiveness, the Holy Spirit, and salvation.

== Importance of the Kerygma according to the Catholic Church ==
The Catholic Church has emphasized the kerygma in its teaching and work of evangelization, identifying it as "the center of all evangelizing activity and all efforts at Church renewal," according to Pope Francis in his programmatic document, Evangelii Gaudium, the Joy of the Gospel which is on the "Proclamation of the Gospel in Today's World." He formulated the kergyma as “Jesus Christ loves you; he gave his life to save you; and now he is living at your side every day to enlighten, strengthen and free you.”

Pope Francis emphasized that the kerygma is not only first in the chronological sense, but it is "first in a qualitative sense because it is the principal proclamation, the one which we must hear again and again in different ways, the one which we must announce one way or another throughout the process of catechesis, at every level and moment...Nothing is more solid, profound, secure, meaningful and wisdom-filled than that initial proclamation. All Christian formation consists of entering more deeply into the kerygma, which is reflected in and constantly illumines, the work of catechesis, thereby enabling us to understand more fully the significance of every subject which the latter treats."

In his Exhortation to the youth, Christus Vivit, Christ is Alive, Pope Francis emphasized "what is essential", which is called "the three great truths that all of us need constantly to keep hearing": (1) God loves you: "At every moment, you are infinitely loved;" (2) Christ, out of love, sacrificed himself completely in order to save you: Christ "continues to save and redeem us by the power of his total self-surrender. Look to his cross;" (3) Christ is alive! "Alive, he can be present in your life at every moment."

== See also ==
- Clementine literature
- Evangelism
- Neo-orthodoxy
