= New Testament and Mythology =

Book by Rudolf Bultmann

New Testament and Mythology: The Problem of Demythologizing the New Testament Message, often shortened to New Testament and Mythology, is an influential and controversial theological essay by Rudolf Bultmann, published in 1941. The essay is generally considered one of the defining theological works of the 20th century. In it, Bultmann stresses the need to understand the New Testament, particularly the Gospels and their account of Christ, as being mythological in nature.

== Sources ==
- Ogden, Schubert, Introduction to New Testament and Mythology, Fortress Press edition
