= Heinrich Vogel =

German theologian, poet and composer (1902-1989)

Heinrich Vogel (April 9, 1902 – December 26, 1989) was a German evangelical theologian, poet of sacred texts and songs and composer of numerous motets and chamber music.

== Biography ==
Vogel studied theology at the University of Berlin and the University of Jena. In 1927 he became a minister for the Evangelical Church of the old-Prussian Union in Oderberg.

Soon after the Nazi takeover in Germany Vogel joined the Confessing Church, the movement of Protestants opposing the adulteration of the Protestant creeds by the Nazi-submissive so-called German Christians, with Vogel building up independent church administrations paralleling those within Protestant regional denominations under German-Christians' dominance (so-called destroyed churches) and was elected a member of the German-wide Protestant Synod of Confession and the old-Prussian Union Synod of Confession. Uncompromisingly he fought the German Christians and committed himself to the opposition against the Nazi state. In 1935 he became lecturer at the outlawed underground Ecclesiastical College (Kirchliche Hochschule) in Berlin and served as its director between 1937 and 1941. In those years he was several times arrested and inflicted the prohibition to write and publish in 1941.

He was a professor of systematic theology at Humboldt University in East Berlin in 1948 and co-founder of the Christian Peace Conference (CFK). His theological method was Christocentric word theology (christozentrische Worttheologie). Vogel was married since 1928 with his wife Irmgard (died 1980), with whom he had seven children.
