= Gerhard Ebeling =

German theologian

- Born: 6 July 1912; Berlin, Germany
- Died: 30 September 2001 (aged 89)
- Spouse: Kometa Richner (m. 1939)

Ecclesiastical career
- Religion: Christianity (Lutheran)
- Church: Confessing Church
- Ordained: 1938

Academic background
- Education: University of Zürich
- Thesis: Evangelical Interpretation of the Gospels
- Doctoral advisor: Fritz Blanke; Emil Brunner
- Influences: Dietrich Bonhoeffer; Rudolf Bultmann; Martin Luther

Academic work
- Discipline: History; theology
- Sub-discipline: Ecclesiastical history; historical theology; systematic theology
- Institutions: University of Tübingen; University of Zürich
- Influenced: Gerhard Forde; Eberhard Jüngel

Gerhard Ebeling (July 6, 1912 – September 30, 2001) was a German Lutheran theologian and with Ernst Fuchs a leading proponent of new hermeneutic theology in the 20th century. Upon his death, Eberhard Jüngel called him a 'doctor of the church'.

== Life ==
Ebeling was born on 6 July 1912 in Steglitz, Berlin, where he attended the gymnasium and began his university study. Ebeling was later a student of Rudolf Bultmann and Wilhelm Maurer in Marburg and of Emil Brunner at the University of Zürich, Switzerland. The years of his study in Berlin, Marburg, and Zürich fell in the period of Nazism in Germany, and his contact with Dietrich Bonhoeffer as well as his work in the Confessing Church had an enduring influence on his thought. He completed his Doctor of Theology degree in 1938 at the University of Zürich under the supervision of Fritz Blanke; his dissertation was entitled Evangelical Interpretation of the Gospels: An Investigation of Luther's Hermeneutic.

Already in this early work, Ebeling's interest in systematic as well as historical questions was very apparent. At the end of the Second World War, he completed in 1947 his habilitation at the University of Tübingen, Germany, and assumed the chair for ecclesiastical history in Tübingen. In 1954 Ebeling changed his focus of study from ecclesiastical history to systematic theology and became Professor of Systematic Theology in Tübingen. Two years later, he was called to the University of Zürich in systematic. With the exception of the period from 1965 to 1968, when he was once again in Tübingen, Ebeling remained in Zürich, where he was the founder and, until his retirement in 1979, the director of the Institute for Hermeneutics.

From 1950 Ebeling was the chief editor of the publication Zeitschrift für Theologie und Kirche, and for several decades he presided over the Commission for the Publication of the Works of Martin Luther. Gerhard Ebeling held honorary doctorates from the universities of Bonn (1952), Uppsala (1970), St. Louis (1971), Edinburgh (1981), Neuchâtel (1993), and Tübingen (1997).

Ebeling's primary academic interests lay in the area of hermeneutics and the theology of Martin Luther, and both of these areas were combined in his focus on the proclamation of the gospel in the Christian Church. In connection with hermeneutics and the New Testament, he came in close contact with Ernst Fuchs, with whom he shared his interest in proclamation; in the early 1960s, Ebeling and Fuchs were guest lecturers at Claremont in Southern California where they presented their vision of a new hermeneutic. Both Ebeling and Fuchs stressed the character and power of language, the role of the Bible in the pulpit.

The theologian Hans-Dieter Betz praised Ebeling for his "theological profundity, ethical sensitivity, human wisdom, and the refined style of his German prose," the combination of which "constitutes a permanent intellectual treasure."

He died on 30 September 2001.

== Works ==
- Evangelische Evangelienauslegung. Eine Untersuchung zu Luthers Hermeneutik. 1942 (= Ebelings Dissertation)
- Das Wesen des christlichen Glaubens. 1959
- Wort und Glaube, 4 vols. 1960–1995
- Wort Gottes und Tradition. Studien zu einer Hermeneutik der Konfessionen. 1964
- Luther. Einführung in sein Denken. 1964; ISBN 3-16-143581-8 (Tb.)
- Lutherstudien, 3 Bände (in 5 Teilbänden). 1971–1989.
- Einführung in theologische Sprachlehre. 1971; ISBN 3-16-132511-7
- Dogmatik des christlichen Glaubens, 3 Bände. 1979, 4. edition 2012; ISBN 978-3-16-151028-1
- Predigten eines „Illegalen“ aus den Jahren 1939–1945. 1995; ISBN 3-16-146371-4
- Luthers Seelsorge. Theologie in der Vielfalt der Lebenssituationen an seinen Briefen dargestellt. 1997; ISBN 3-16-146712-4

== See also ==
- Kirchenkampf
