= Hans Jonas =

German-American philosopher of environmentalism and Gnosticism (1903–1993)

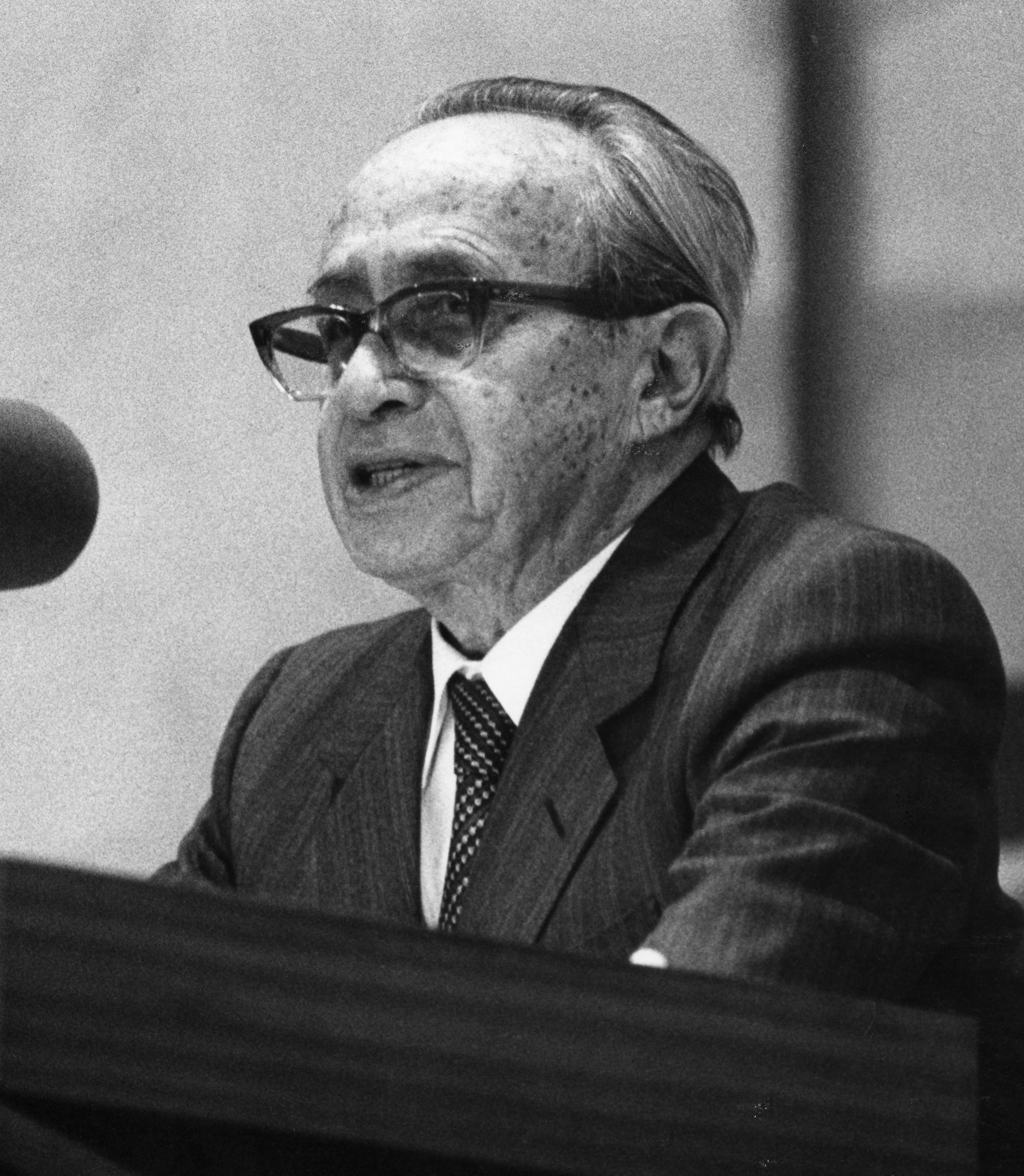
- Born: 10 May 1903; Mönchengladbach, Rhine Province, Kingdom of Prussia, German Empire
- Died: 5 February 1993 (aged 89); New Rochelle, New York, U.S.

Education
- Education: University of Freiburg; Friedrich Wilhelm University of Berlin; Heidelberg University; Marburg University (PhD, 1928)
- Thesis: Der Begriff der Gnosis (The Concept of Gnosis) (1928)
- Doctoral advisor: Martin Heidegger

Philosophical work
- Era: 20th-century philosophy
- Region: Western philosophy
- School: Continental philosophy Lebensphilosophie
- Institutions: The New School
- Notable students: Henry E. Allison
- Main interests: Bioethics, political science, philosophy of religion, philosophy of technology
- Notable works: The Gnostic Religion; The Imperative of Responsibility; The Phenomenon of Life
- Notable ideas: The imperative of responsibility, right to ignorance

Hans Jonas (/ˈjoʊnɑːs/; German: [ˈjoːnas]; 10 May 1903 – 5 February 1993) was a German and American philosopher. From 1955 to 1976 he was the Alvin Johnson Professor of Philosophy at the New School for Social Research in New York City.

== Biography ==
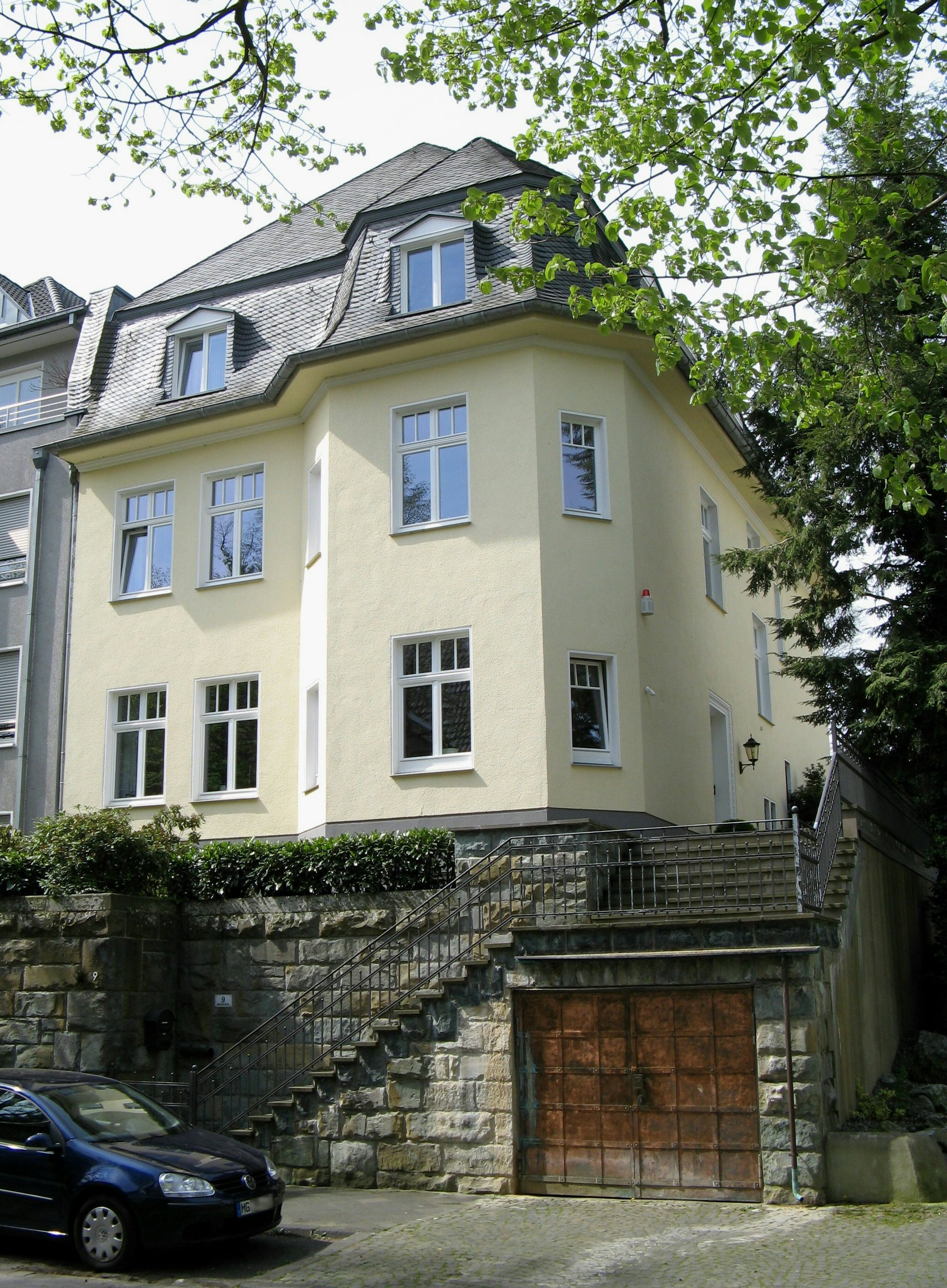
Birth house of Hans Jonas in Mönchengladbach

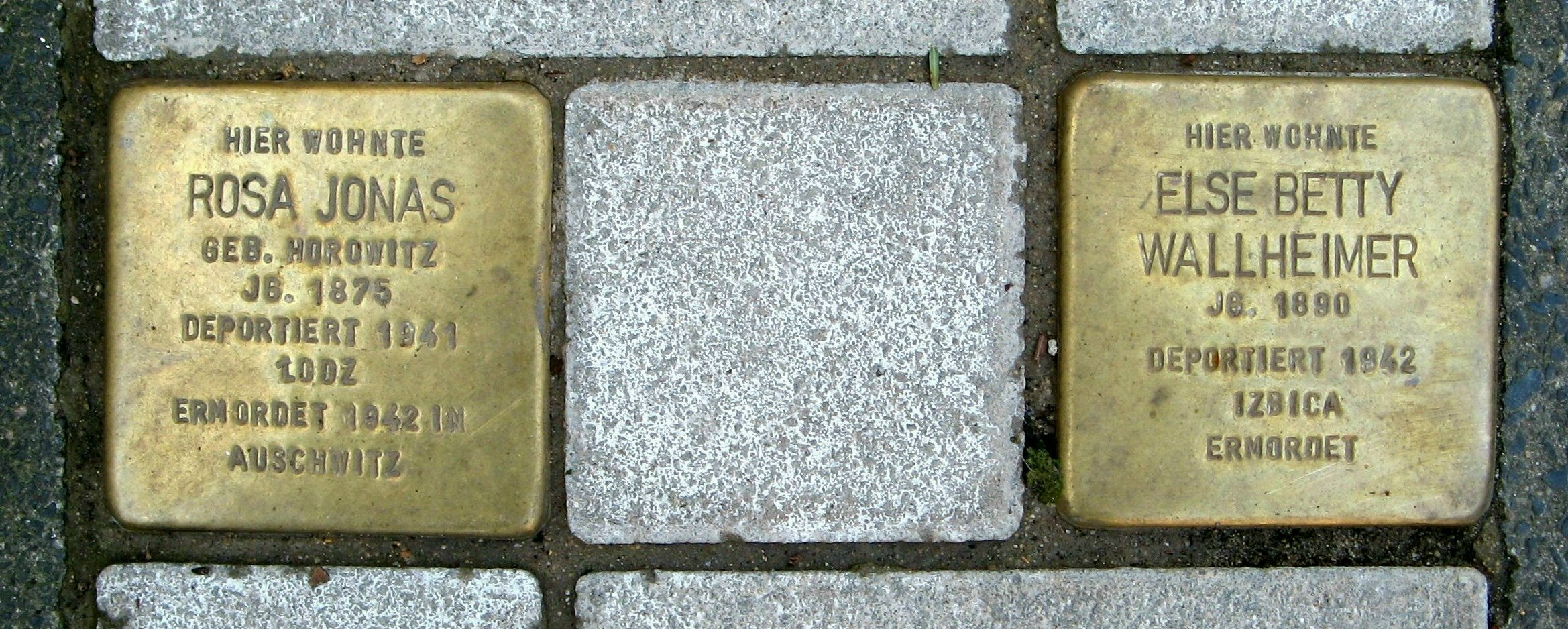
In front of the house, two Stolpersteine were installed in 2008. The left one commemorates the philosopher's mother Rosa Jonas, murdered in Auschwitz in 1942.

Jonas was born in Mönchengladbach, on 10 May 1903 to a Jewish family. He studied philosophy and theology at the University of Freiburg, the Friedrich Wilhelm University of Berlin and Heidelberg University, and earned his Doctorate of Philosophy in 1928 from Marburg University with a thesis on Gnosticism entitled Der Begriff der Gnosis (The Concept of Gnosis) and directed by Martin Heidegger. During his studies his academic advisors included Edmund Husserl and Rudolf Bultmann. At Marburg University he met Hannah Arendt, who was also pursuing her PhD there, and the two of them were to remain friends for the rest of their lives.

When Heidegger joined the Nazi Party in 1933, it may have disturbed Jonas, as he was Jewish and an active Zionist. In 1964 Jonas repudiated his mentor Heidegger for his affiliation with the Nazis.

He left Germany for England in 1933, and from England he moved to Palestine in 1934. There he met Lore Weiner, to whom he became betrothed. In 1940 he enlisted in the British Army. He served in the Jewish Brigade and was sent to Italy, and in the last phase of the war moved into Germany. Thus, he kept his promise that he would return only as a soldier in the victorious army. During this time he wrote several letters to Lore about philosophy, in particular philosophy of biology, that would form the basis of his later publications on the subject. They finally married in 1943.

Immediately after the war he returned to Mönchengladbach to search for his mother but found that she had been sent to the gas chambers in the Auschwitz concentration camp. Having heard this, he refused to live in Germany again. He returned to Palestine and took part in the 1948 Arab-Israeli War. Jonas briefly taught at the Hebrew University of Jerusalem before moving to North America. In 1950 he left for Canada, teaching at Carleton University. From there he moved to New York City in 1955, where he was to live for the rest of his life. He was a fellow of the Hastings Center and Professor of Philosophy at New School for Social Research (where he was Alvin Johnson Professor) from 1955 to 1976. From 1982 to 1983, Jonas held the Eric Voegelin Visiting Professorship at LMU Munich. He died at his home in New Rochelle, New York, on 5 February 1993, aged 89.

== Philosophical work ==
Jonas's writings were very influential in different spheres. For example, The Gnostic Religion, based on his early research on the gnosis and first published in 1958, was for many years the standard work in English on the subject of Gnosticism. The Imperative of Responsibility (German 1979; English 1984) centers on social and ethical problems created by technology. Jonas insists that human survival depends on our efforts to care for our planet and its future. He formulated a new and distinctive supreme moral imperative: "Act so that the effects of your action are compatible with the permanence of genuine human life".

While The Imperative of Responsibility has been credited with catalyzing the environmental movement in Germany, his work The Phenomenon of Life (1966) forms the philosophical undergirding of one major school of bioethics in America. Murray Bookchin and Leon Kass both referred to Hans Jonas's work as major, or primary, inspiration. Heavily influenced by Martin Heidegger but also one of Heidegger's most outspoken philosophical critics, The Phenomenon of Life attempts to synthesize the philosophy of matter with the philosophy of mind, producing a rich existential understanding of biology, which ultimately argues for a simultaneously material and moral human nature. On the question of abortion, Jonas was against it, saying, "a mother-to-be is more than her individual self. She carries a human trust, and we should not make abortion merely a matter of her own private wish", society had a "social responsibility" to pregnant mothers, and "To give this mission [motherhood] over completely to individual choice oversteps the order of nature."

His writing on the history of Gnosticism revisits terrain covered by earlier standard works on the subject such as Ernesto Buonaiuti's Lo gnosticismo: storia di antiche lotte religiose (1907), interpreting the religion from the perspective of a unique version of existentialist philosophy that also informed his later contributions. He was one of the first philosophers to concern himself with ethical questions in biological science. Jonas's career is generally divided into three periods defined by his three primary works, but in reverse order: studies of gnosticism, studies of philosophical biology, and ethical studies.

== Works ==
- Jonas, Hans (1930). Der Begriff der Gnosis: Teildruck (Doctoral thesis).

=== English books ===
- The Gnostic Religion: The Message of the Alien God & the Beginnings of Christianity (Boston: Beacon Press, 1958) ISBN 0-8070-5801-7 Second, enlarged edition, 1963. Third edition, 2001. (N.B. The "Introduction to the Third Edition" is in fact a talk given by Jonas in 1974.)
- The Phenomenon of Life: Towards a Philosophical Biology (New York, Harper & Row, 1966) OCLC 373876 (Evanston, Ill. : Northwestern University Press, 2001). ISBN 0-8101-1749-5
- The Imperative of Responsibility: In Search of Ethics for the Technological Age (translation of Das Prinzip Verantwortung) trans. Hans Jonas and David Herr (1979). ISBN 0-226-40597-4 (University of Chicago Press, 1984) ISBN 0-226-40596-6
- Philosophical Essays: From Ancient Creed to Technological Man (Chicago: University of Chicago Press, 1974) ISBN 0-226-40591-5
  - "Technology and Responsibility: Reflections on the New Tasks of Ethics," Social Research 15 (Spring 1973).
  - "Jewish and Christian Elements in Philosophy: their Share in the Emergence of the Modern Mind"
  - "Seventeenth Century and After: The Meaning of the Scientific and Technological Revolution"
  - "Socioeconomic Knowledge and Ignorance of Goals"
  - "Philosophical Reflections on Experimenting with Human Subjects"
  - "Against the Stream: Comments on the Definition and Redefinition of Death"
  - "Biological Engineering—A Preview"
  - "Contemporary Problems in Ethics from a Jewish Perspective"
  - "Biological Foundations of Individuality"
  - "Spinoza and the Theory of Organism"
  - "Sight and Thought: A Review of 'Visual Thinking.'"
  - "Change and Permanence: On the Possibility of Understanding History."
  - "The Gnostic Syndrome: Typology of Its Thought, Imagination, and Mood."
  - "The Hymn of the Pearl: Case Study of a Symbol, and the Claims for a Jewish Origin of Gnosticism."
  - "Myth and Mysticism: A Study of Objectification and Interiorization in Religious Thought."
  - "Origen's Metaphysics of Free Will, Fall, and Salvation: a 'Divine Comedy' of the Universe."
  - "The Soul in Gnosticism and Plotinus."
  - "The Abyss of the Will: Philosophical Meditations on the Seventh Chapter of Paul's Epistle to the Romans."
- Mortality and Morality: A Search for the Good After Auschwitz ed. Lawrence Vogel (Evanston, Ill.: Northwestern University Press, 1996). ISBN 0-8101-1286-8
- With Stuart F Spicker: Organism, medicine, and metaphysics : essays in honor of Hans Jonas on his 75th birthday, May 10, 1978 ISBN 90-277-0823-1
- On faith, reason and responsibility (San Francisco: Harper and Row, 1978. New edition: Institute for Antiquity and Christianity, Claremont Graduate School, 1981.) ISBN 0-940440-00-8
- Memoirs (Brandeis University Press, 2008) ISBN 978-1-58465-639-5

==== English monographs ====
- Immortality and the modern temper : the Ingersoll lecture, 1961 (Cambridge : Harvard Divinity School, 1962) OCLC 26072209 (included in The Phenomenon of Life)
- Heidegger and theology (1964) OCLC 14975064 (included in The Phenomenon of Life)
- Ethical aspects of experimentation with human subjects (Boston:American Academy of Arts and Sciences, 1969) OCLC 19884675.

=== German ===
- Gnosis und spätantiker Geist (volume 1: 1934, volume 2,1: 1954, full volume 2: 1993)
- Technik, Medizin und Ethik — Zur Praxis des Prinzips Verantwortung — Frankfurt a.M. : Suhrkamp, 1985 — ISBN 3-518-38014-1 (On Technology, Medicine and Ethics: On the Practice of the Imperative of Responsibility)
- Das Prinzip Verantwortung: Versuch einer Ethik für die technologische Zivilisation (Frankfurt am Main : Insel-Verlag, 1979). ISBN 3-458-04907-X
- Erinnerungen. Nach Gesprächen mit Rachel Salamander, ed. Ch. Wiese. Frankfurt am Mein-Leipzig: Insel Verlag, 2003.
- Macht oder Ohnmacht der Subjektivität? Das Leib-Seele-Problem im Vorfeld des Prinzips Verantwortung. Frankfurt am Main: Insel, 1981, and then Frankfurt am Main: Suhrkamp, 1987. ISBN 3-458-04758-1
- Erkenntnis und Verantwortung, Gespräch mit Ingo Hermann in der Reihe "Zeugen des Jahrhunderts", Edited by I. Hermann. Göttingen: Lamuv, 1991.
- Philosophische Untersuchungen und metaphysische Vermutungen. Frankfurt am Main: Insel, 1992, and then Frankfurt am Main: Suhrkamp, 1994.
- Organismus und Freiheit. Ansätze zu einer philosophischen Biologie. Göttingen: Vandenhoeck & Ruprecht, 1973.
- Augustin und das paulinische Freiheitsproblem. Ein philosophischer Beitrag zur Genesis der christlich-abendländischen Freiheitsidee, Göttingen: Vandenhoeck & Ruprecht, 1930. Second edition entitled Augustin und das paulinische Freiheitsproblem. Eine philosophische Studie zum pelagianischen Streit, with an introduction by J. M. Robinson. Göttingen: Vandenhoeck & Ruprecht, 1965.

=== French ===
- Le concept de Dieu après Auschwitz ISBN 2-86930-769-1
- Evolution et liberté ISBN 2-7436-0580-4
- Le Principe responsabilité ISBN 2-0813-0769-3
- Le Droit de mourir ISBN 2-7436-0104-3
- With Sabine Cornille and Philippe Ivernel: Pour une éthique du futur ISBN 2-7436-0290-2
- Une éthique pour la nature ISBN 2-220-04795-4
- With Sylvie Courtine-Denamy: Entre le néant et l'éternité ISBN 2-7011-1923-5
- La gnose et l'Esprit de l'Antiquité tardive. Histoire et méthodologie de la recherche ISBN 978-88-6976-059-4.

=== Selected papers ===
- "The Right to Die." Hastings Center Report 8, number 4 (1978): 31–36.
- "Straddling the Boundaries of Theory and Practice: Recombinant DNA Research as a Case of Action in the Process of Inquiry." In Recombinant DNA: Science, Ethics and Politics, edited by J. Richards, 253–71. New York: Academic Press, 1978.
- "Toward a Philosophy of Technology." Hastings Center Report 9 (1979): 34–43.
- "The Heuristics of Fear." In Ethics in an Age of Pervasive Technology, edited by Melvin Kranzberg, 213–21. Boulder, Colo.: Westview Press, 1980.
- "Parallelism and Complementarity: The Psycho-Physical Problem in Spinoza and in the Succession of Niels Bohr." In The Philosophy of Baruch Spinoza, edited by Richard Kennington, 121–30. Washington, D.C.: Catholic University of the Americas Press, 1980.
- "Reflections on Technology, Progress and Utopia." Social Research 48 (1981): 411–55.
- "Technology as a Subject for Ethics." Social Research 49 (1982): 891–98.
- "Is Faith Still Possible? Memories of Rudolf Bultmann and Reflections on the Philosophical Aspects of His Work." Harvard Theological Review 75 (1982): 1–23.
- "Ontological Grounding of a Political Ethics: On the Metaphysics of Commitment to the Future of Man." Graduate Faculty Philosophical Journal 10, no. 1 (1984): 47–62.
- "Ethics and Biogenetic Art." Social Research 52 (1985): 491–504.
- "The Concept of God after Auschwitz: A Jewish Voice." Journal of Religion 67, number 1 (1987): 1–13.
- "The Consumer's Responsibility." In Ecology and Ethics. A Report from the Melbu conference, 18–23 July 1990, edited by Audun Øfsti, 215–18. Trondheim: Nordland Akademi for Kunst og Vitenskap, 1992.
- "The Burden and Blessing of Mortality." Hastings Center Report 22, no. 1 (1992): 34–40.
- "Philosophy at the End of the Century: A Survey of Its Past and Future." Social Research 61, number 4 (1994): 812–32.
- "Wissenschaft as Personal Experience [brief memoir]," The Hastings Center report 32:4 (Jul–Aug 2002): 27–35 ISSN 0093-0334
- "Materialism and the Theory of Organism." University of Toronto Quarterly, 21, 1 (1951): 39–52.

=== Other papers ===
- "Causality and Perception," The Journal of Philosophy, Vol. 47, No. 11 (May 25, 1950), pp. 319–324
- "The Nobility of Sight," Philosophy and Phenomenological Research, Vol. 14, No. 4 (Jun., 1954), pp. 507–519. (also in The Phenomenon of Life)
- "Immortality and the Modern Temper: The Ingersoll Lecture, 1961" The Harvard Theological Review, volume 55, number 1 (January 1962), pp. 1–20. (also in The Phenomenon of Life)
- "The Secret Books of the Egyptian Gnostics," The Journal of Religion, Vol. 42, No. 4 (Oct., 1962), pp. 262–273.
- "Myth and Mysticism: A Study of Objectification and Interiorization in Religious Thought," The Journal of Religion, Vol. 49, No. 4 (October 1969), pp. 315–329
- "Freedom of Scientific Inquiry and the Public Interest," The Hastings Center Report, volume 6, number 4 (August 1976), pp. 15–17.

== See also ==
- Bioconservatism – Cautious stance towards modifying human nature
- Environmental movement
- Ethics of technology
- Jewish philosophy
- Natural environment
