= Onondaga County Public Libraries =

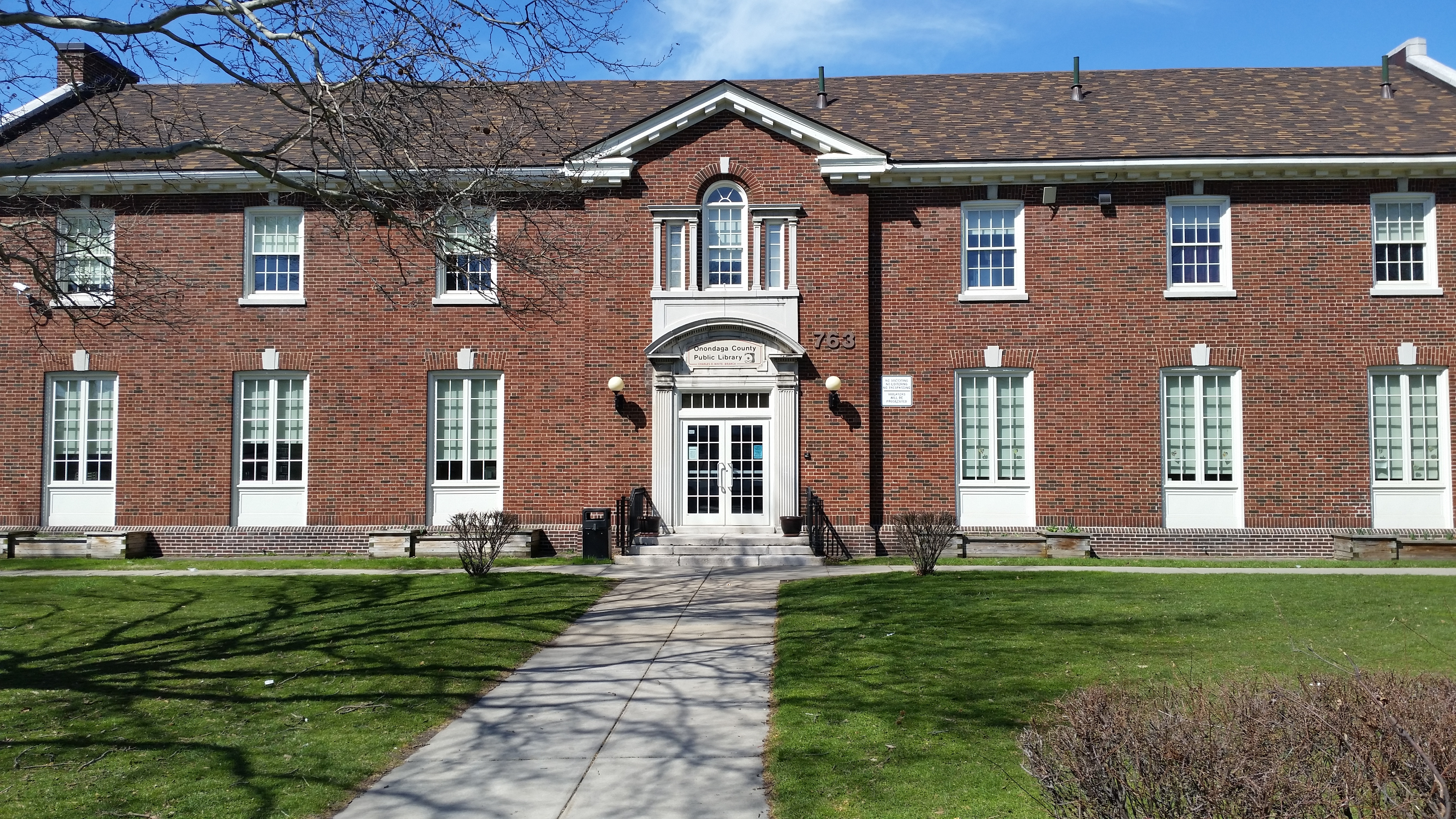
- White Branch library
- Location: Onondaga County, New York, United States
- Established: 1976
- Branches: 32

Other information
- Website: www.onlib.org

Onondaga County Public Libraries (OCPL) is a consolidated county library system with more than 30 branches in Onondaga County. Its headquarters are in Syracuse, New York. It was established in 1976 as a result of the merger of the Onondaga Library System and Syracuse Public library.

== Branch locations ==
City libraries

- Central Library
- Beauchamp Branch Library
- Betts Branch Library
- Hazard Branch Library
- Mundy Branch Library
- Northeast Community Center Library
- Paine Branch Library
- Petit Branch Library
- Soule Branch Library
- Southwest Community Center Library
- White Branch Library

Suburban libraries

- Baldwinsville Public Library
- Brewerton NOPL
- Cicero NOPL
- Community Library of DeWitt & Jamesville
- East Syracuse Free Library
- Elbridge Free Library
- Fairmount Community Library
- Fayetteville Free Library
- Jordan Bramley Library
- LaFayette Public Library
- Liverpool Public Library
- Manlius Library
- Marcellus Free Library
- Maxwell Memorial Library
- Minoa Library
- North Syracuse NOPL
- Onondaga Free Library
- Salina Library
- Skaneateles Library
- Solvay Public Library
- Tully Free Library
