= Ernst Fuchs (theologian) =

German theologian (1903–1983)

Ernst Fuchs (11 January 1903 – 15 January 1983) was a German New Testament theologian and a student of Rudolf Bultmann. With Gerhard Ebeling he was a leading proponent of a New Hermeneutic theology in the 20th century.

== Life ==
Fuchs was born in Heilbronn on 11 June 1903 He was nurtured in the Swabian culture of Esslingen and Cannstatt and attended minor seminaries in Schoental and Urach (1918–22). His student years at Tübingen (1922–24, 1925–27) and Marburg (1924–25, 1927–29) during the heyday of dialectical theology were indelibly stamped by the theology of Karl Barth, the philosophy of M. Heidegger, and the NT studies of R. Bultmann, under whom he received his doctorate at Marburg in 1929.

== New hermeneutic ==
Fuchs' concern is not to ask for the meaning of the text, but to learn how to listen to unobtrusive language about human beings' existence according to the hermeneutical help given with the texts itself. This is the New Hermeneutic.

Fuchs' achievement lay in bringing the insights of Karl Barth, Rudolf Bultmann, and Martin Heidegger into fruitful conjunction. He sought to bridge Barth's Calvinist emphasis on the revealed Word of God with Rudolf Bultmann's Lutheran emphasis on the nature of human existence before God by employing a phenomenology of language derived in part from Heidegger's later position, arguing that both human existence and the being of God are ultimately linguistic — made available in language – and that theology is thus properly "faith's doctrine of language" (Sprachlehre des Glaubens). Theology's task is essentially hermeneutical. Theology translates Scripture into contemporary terms and contemporary existence into scriptural terms. Fuchs' interests is language event with existential philosophy. Conversely, the reality of God's love is verbalized in Jesus' word and deeds recorded in the Gospels and is thus preserved as language gain (Sprachgewinn). In the freedom of proclamation God's presence in the gospel and the "Yes of love: happens again – that is, comes to be as language, opening up the future to authentic existence (faith, hope, and love).

== Language event ==
Language event (Sprachereignis) is an act or instance of written or spoken communication. In 1920s earliest use was found in Journal of Philosophy. In theology this word was used by Ernest Fuchs. Ernest Fuchs' doctrine of language helped to inspire a "new quest" of the historical Jesus because it could now be said that Jesus' words and deeds constituted that "language event" (Sprachereignisse) in which faith first entered into language, thereby becoming available as an existential possibility within language, the "house of being" (Heidegger).

== Sources ==
- P. J. Achemeier, Introduction to the New Hermeneutic (1969)
- J. Fangmeier, Ernst Fuchs: Versuch einer Orientierung (ThStud 80, 1964)
- J. M. Robinson and J.B.Cob (eds.), The New Hermeneutic (New Frontiers in Theology 2. 1964)
- R. N. Soulen, Ernst Fuchs: NT Theologian, JAAR 39 (1971): 467-87
- Ky-Chun So Hooks & Ebeling: History of Hermeneutics and New Hermeneutics (Salim: 2006)
