= Fritz Blanke =

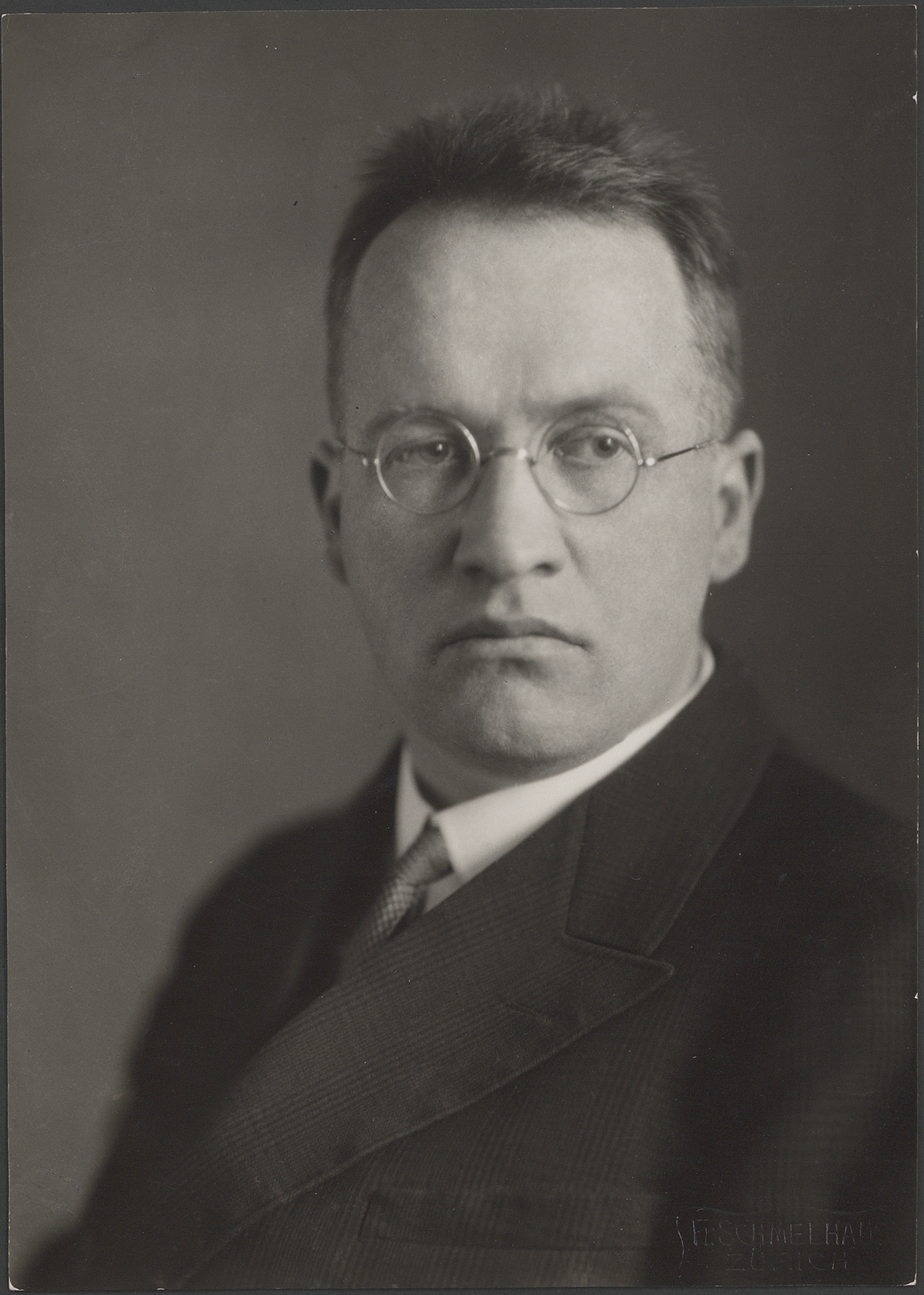
Fritz Blanke

Fritz Blanke (22 April 1900 - 4 March 1967) was a Swiss church historian. As a researcher he mainly focussed on Martin Luther, Johann Georg Hamann, Huldrych Zwingli, the Anabaptists and the relationship between churches and sects.

== Life ==
He was born in Kreuzlingen and studied theology in the universities of Tübingen, Heidelberg and Berlin.

In 1926 he became a privatdozent in church history in Königsberg. From 1929 onwards he was professor for church history and history of dogma at the University of Zürich, where in 1964 he founded the Institut für Schweizerische Reformationsgeschichte (Institute for Swiss Reformation History).

He received an honorary doctorate from the Albertus-Universität Königsberg in 1930. Originally holding German citizenship, he became a naturalised Swiss citizen in Zürich in 1939, where he later died.

== Selected works ==
=== Monographs ===
- Der verborgene Gott bei Luther. 1928.
- Johann Georg Hamann als Theologe. 1928.
- Das Wesen der Sekte. 1934.
- Columban und Gallus. Urgeschichte des schweizerischen Christentums. 1940.
- Ulrich Zwingli, 1940.
- Der Islam als missionarisches Problem. 1941.
- Der junge Bullinger 1504–1531. (collaboration with Leo Weisz). 1942.
- Die leibliche Himmelfahrt der Jungfrau Maria. Zürich 1950.
- Luthers Humor. Scherz und Schalk in Luthers Seelsorge. 1954.
- Brüder in Christo. Die Geschichte der ältesten Täufergemeinde. Zollikon 1525. 1955.

=== Reviews and journal articles ===
- Zu Zwinglis Vorrede an Luther in der Schrift «Amica Exegesis» 1527. In: Zwingliania, 5/4, 1930, S. 185–192. (Online version)
- Zwinglis Beitrag zur reformatorischen Botschaft. In: Zwingliania, 5/5–6, 1931, S. 262–275. (Online version)
- Reformation und Alkoholismus. In: Zwingliania, 9/2, 1949, p. 75–89. (Online version)
- Bischof Sailer and Johann Caspar Lavater. In: Zwingliania, 9/7, 1952, p. 431–443. (Online version)
- Täufertum und Reformation. In: Guy F. Hershberger (ed.): Das Täufertum. Erbe und Verpflichtung. Stuttgart 1963.

== Bibliography ==
=== In English ===
- Fritz Büsser: Fritz Blanke as a Reformation Historian. In: Mennonite Quarterly Review, 43, Goshen (Indiana) 1969, p. 38 ff.
- Jacobus Ten Doornkaat Koolman: Fritz Blanke, the Man. In: Mennonite Quarterly Review, 43, Goshen (Indiana) 1969, p. 5 ff.
- Heinold Fast: Fritz Blanke's Contribution to the Interpretation of Anabaptism. In: Mennonite Quarterly Review, 43, Goshen (Indiana) 1969, p. 51 ff.
- Ulrich Gäbler: Fritz Blanke, Church Historian. In: Mennonite Quarterly Review, 43, Goshen (Indiana) 1969, p. 22 ff.

=== In German ===
- Friedrich Wilhelm Bautz (1975). "Blanke, Fritz". In Bautz, Friedrich Wilhelm (ed.). Biographisch-Bibliographisches Kirchenlexikon (BBKL) (in German). Vol. 1. Hamm: Bautz. cols. 611–612. ISBN 3-88309-013-1.
- Heinold Fast: Ein Bruder in Christo. Zum Tode v. Prof. D. Fritz Blanke. In: Mennonitische Geschichtsblätter, 24, 1967, p. 15 ff.
- Ulrich Gäbler: Fritz Blanke. Zum hundertsten Geburtstag am 22. April. In: Zwingliania, 27, 2000, p. 7–12. (Online version)
- Frank Jehle: Fritz Blanke – Lehrer und Forscher. Vortrag an der Mitgliederversammlung des Zwinglivereins 2012. In: Zwingliana, 19 (2012), p. 131–144. (Online version). Also in: Frank Jehle: Von Johannes auf Patmos bis zu Karl Barth. Zürich 2015, p. 163–174.
- Christoph Möhl: Fritz Blanke. Querdenker mit Herz. Zug 2011.
- Leonhard von Muralt: Fritz Blanke. 22. April 1900 bis 4. März 1967. In: Zwingliania, Bd. 12, H. 7, p. 465–469. (Online version)
- Leonhard von Muralt: Ein Gedenkheft für Fritz Blanke. In: Zwingliania, 13/3 (1970), p. 206–210. (Online version)
- Fritz Schmidt-Clausing: Das neue Zwinglibild. Seinem Initiator zum Gedächtnis. In: Deutsches Pfarrerblatt, 68, 1968, p. 162f.
- Alfred Schindler: Blanke, Fritz. In: Historisches Lexikon der Schweiz.

== External links (in German) ==
- Publications by and about Fritz Blanke in the catalogue Helveticat of the Swiss National Library
- Literature by and about Fritz Blanke in the German National Library catalogue
- Hans Ulrich Bächtold: Blanke, Fritz. In: Mennonitisches Lexikon. Vol. 5 (MennLex 5).
- Institut für Schweizerische Reformationsgeschichte of the Universität Zürich
- Fritz Blanke Gesellschaft
