= Rudolf Bultmann =

German Lutheran theologian (1884–1976)

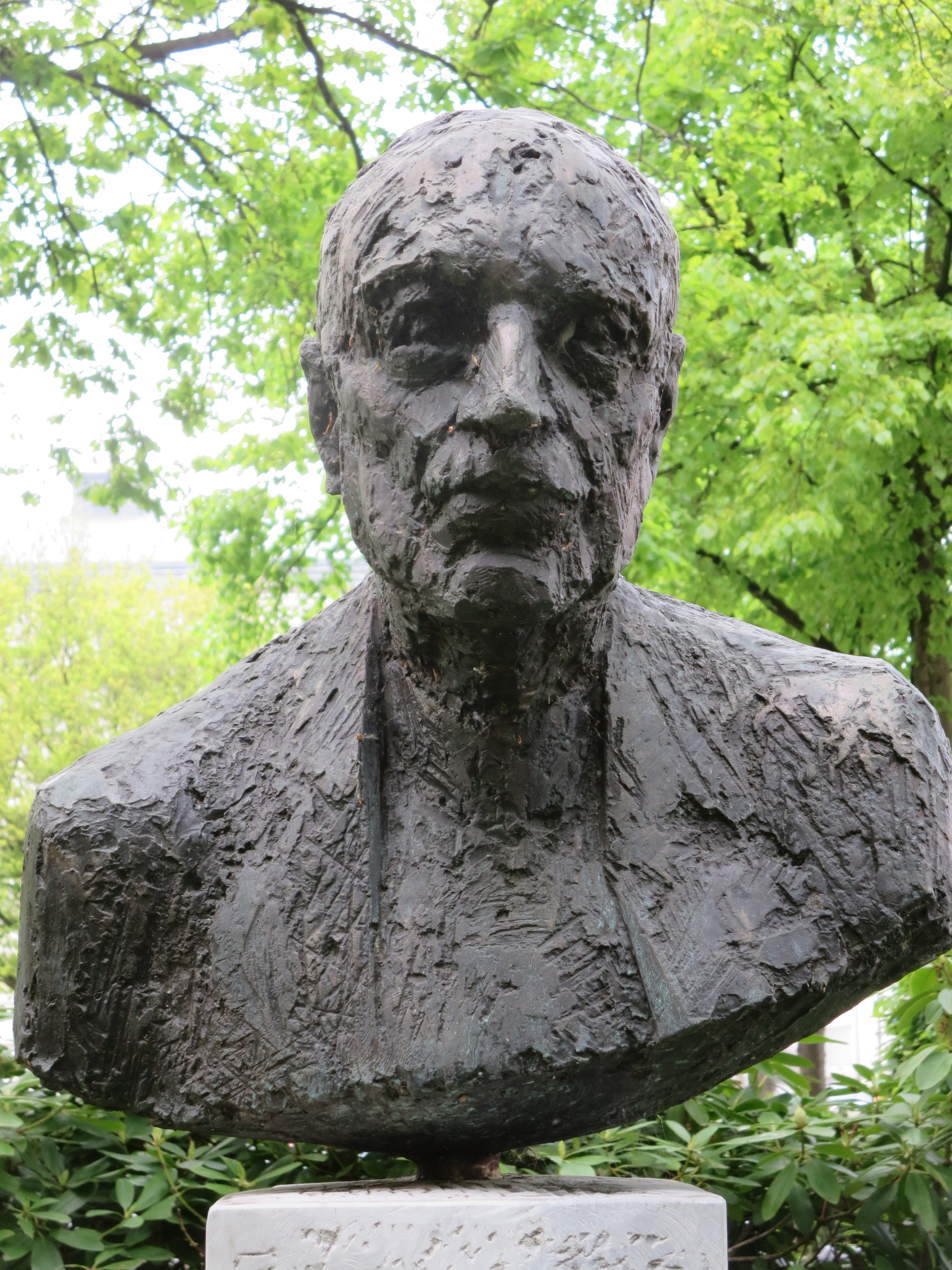
- Bultmann in bust by Michael Mohns (2022)
- Born: Rudolf Karl Bultmann; 20 August 1884; Wiefelstede, Oldenburg, Germany
- Died: 30 July 1976 (aged 91); Marburg, Hesse, West Germany
- Spouse: Helene Feldmann (m. 1917; died 1973)
- Children: 3 (including Antje)

Academic background
- Education: University of Marburg
- Thesis: Der Stil der paulinischen Predigt und die kynisch-stoische Diatribe (1910)
- Doctoral advisor: Johannes Weiss
- Influences: Karl Barth; Hermann Gunkel; Adolf von Harnack; Martin Heidegger; Wilhelm Herrmann; Wilhelm Heitmüller; Adolf Jülicher; Martin Kähler; Rudolf Otto; Friedrich Schleiermacher; Johannes Weiss

Academic work
- Discipline: Theology; biblical studies
- School or tradition: Dialectical theology; Lutheranism
- Institutions: University of Marburg
- Doctoral students: Günther Bornkamm; Ernst Fuchs; Hans Jonas; Ernst Käsemann; Helmut Koester
- Influenced: Herbert Braun; John Dominic Crossan; Uta Ranke-Heinemann; James M. Robinson; John A. T. Robinson; Heinrich Schlier; John Shelby Spong

Signature
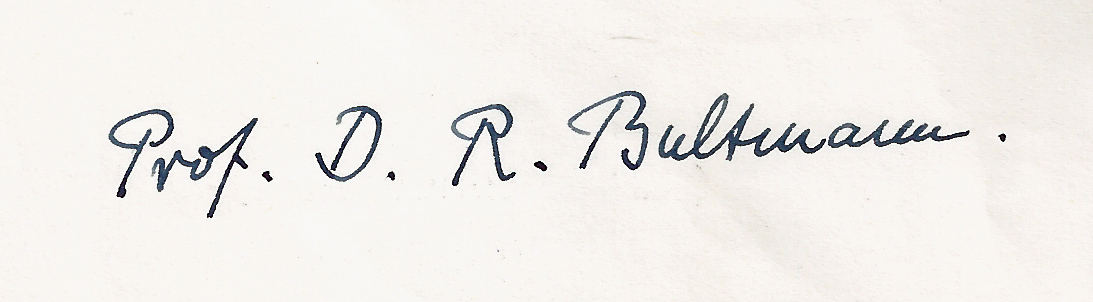

Rudolf Karl Bultmann (/ˈbʊltmɑːn/; German: [ˈbʊltman]; 20 August 1884 – 30 July 1976) was a German Lutheran theologian and professor of the New Testament at the University of Marburg. He was one of the major figures of early 20th-century biblical studies. A prominent critic of liberal theology, Bultmann instead argued for an existentialist interpretation of the New Testament. His hermeneutical approach to the New Testament led him to be a proponent of dialectical theology.

Bultmann is known for his belief that the historical analysis of the New Testament is both futile and unnecessary, given that the earliest Christian literature showed little interest in specific locations. Bultmann argued that all that matters is the "thatness," not the "whatness" of Jesus, (Note: For a similar epistemological comparison, see haeccity and quiddity.) i.e. only that Jesus existed, preached, and died by crucifixion matters, not what happened throughout his life.

Bultmann relied on demythologization, an approach interpreting the mythological elements in the New Testament existentially. Bultmann contended that only faith in the kerygma, or proclamation, of the New Testament was necessary for Christian faith, not any particular facts regarding the historical Jesus.

== Background ==
Bultmann was born on 20 August 1884 in Wiefelstede, Oldenburg, the son of Arthur Kennedy Bultmann, a Lutheran minister. He did his Abitur at the Altes Gymnasium in the city of Oldenburg, and studied theology at Tübingen. After three terms Bultmann went to the University of Berlin for two terms, and finally to Marburg for two more terms. He received his degree in 1910 from Marburg with a dissertation on the Epistles of St Paul written under the supervision of Johannes Weiss. He also studied under Hermann Gunkel and Wilhelm Heitmüller. After submitting a habilitation two years later, he became a lecturer on the New Testament at Marburg.

Bultmann married Helene Feldmann on 6 August 1917. The couple had three daughters, including librarian Antje Bultmann Lemke. Bultmann's wife died in 1973.

After brief lectureships at Breslau and Giessen, Bultmann returned to Marburg in 1921 as a full professor, and stayed there until his retirement in 1951. His doctoral students included Hans Jonas, Ernst Käsemann, Günther Bornkamm, Helmut Koester, and Ernst Fuchs. He also taught Hannah Arendt. From autumn 1944 until the end of the Second World War in 1945 he took into his family Uta Ranke-Heinemann, who had fled the bombs and destruction in Essen.

Bultmann became friends with Martin Heidegger who taught at Marburg for five years. Heidegger's views on existentialism had an influence on Bultmann's thinking. What arose from this friendship was a "sort of comradery" grounded on an active and open dialogue between Bultmann and Heidegger from 1923 to 1928. However, Bultmann himself stated that his views could not simply be reduced to thinking in Heideggerian categories, in that "the New Testament is not a doctrine about our nature, about our authentic existence as human beings, but a proclamation of this liberating act of God."

He was critical of Nazism from the beginning and his career between 1933 and 1941 was marked by a series of struggles with Nazis regarding their influence upon the universities and the Protestant Church. As a Lutheran who held that the Church could not expect the Nazi State to be Christian, he did not directly denounce its antisemitism. But he objected to its claim to have authority over all aspects of German life including the universities and the Protestant church and believed it was his responsibility to preach that it was unChristian, especially after Heidegger gave his pro-Nazi rectorial address in 1933. He particularly rejected the Aryan paragraph that disenfranchised all people racially Jewish from civic organizations and many professions including clergy, entailing defrocking any Christian clergy with Jewish ancestry. He stated that the Aryan paragraph was "incompatible with the essence of the Christian church", since the church made no distinction between Jew and Gentile. He joined the Confessing Church, a Protestant movement in Nazi Germany that arose in opposition to government-sponsored efforts to unify all Protestant churches into a single pro-Nazi Reich Church.

Bultmann received many honors during and after his career, including honorary doctorates from many universities and elections to honorary societies. In 1974, the Federal Republic granted him the highest level of the Order of Merit.

He died on 30 July 1976 in Marburg.

== Theological approaches ==
Bultmann's History of the Synoptic Tradition (1921) remains highly influential as a tool for biblical research, even among scholars who reject his analyses of the conventional rhetorical pericopes (narrative units) which comprise the gospels, and the historically-oriented principles of "form criticism" of which Bultmann was the most influential exponent.

According to Bultmann's definition, "[t]he aim of form-criticism [sic] is to determine the original form of a piece of narrative, a dominical saying or a parable. In the process we learn to distinguish secondary additions and forms, and these in turn lead to important results for the history of the tradition."

In 1941 Bultmann applied form criticism (Note: "Form criticism" in this instance is a tenet of Hegelian dialectics of which Bultmann applied to theology. The dialectic of Form and Content is explained by Hegel using an example of a book: a book's Form (whether or not it was handwritten, or a hardback copy, etc.), can neither determine nor influence its inner Content, yet, at the same time, that Content requires a form to be read.) to the Gospel of John, in which he distinguished the presence of a lost Signs Gospel on which John—alone of the evangelists—depended. His monograph, Das Evangelium des Johannes, highly controversial at the time, became a milestone in research into the historical Jesus. The same year his lecture New Testament and Mythology: The Problem of Demythologizing the New Testament Message called on interpreters to demythologize the New Testament; in particular he argued for replacing supernatural biblical interpretations with temporal and existential categorizations. His argument, in many ways, reflected a hermeneutical adaption of the existentialist thought of his colleague at the time, the philosopher Martin Heidegger - but also the hermeneutic procedures developed by Hans Jonas, a student of Heidegger and an exile from Nazi Germany. This approach led Bultmann to reject doctrines such as the pre-existence of Christ. Bultmann believed his endeavors in this regard would make accessible to modern audiences — already immersed in science and technology — the significance (or existential quality) of Jesus' teachings. Bultmann thus thought of his endeavor of "demythologizing the New Testament proclamation" as fundamentally an evangelism task, clarifying the kerygma, or gospel proclamation, by stripping it of elements of the first-century "mythical world picture" that had potential to alienate modern people from Christian faith:

It is impossible to repristinate a past world picture by sheer resolve, especially a mythical world picture, now that all of our thinking is irrevocably formed by science. A blind acceptance of New Testament mythology would be simply arbitrariness; to make such acceptance a demand of faith would be to reduce faith to a work.

Bultmann saw theology in existential terms, and maintained that the New Testament was a radical text, worthy of understanding yet questioned in his time because of the prevailing Protestant conviction in a supernatural interpretation. In both the boasting of legalists "who are faithful to the law" and the boasting of the philosophers "who are proud of their wisdom", Bultmann finds a "basic human attitude" of "highhandedness that tries to bring within our own power even the submission that we know to be our authentic being". Standing against all human high-handedness is the New Testament, "which claims that we can in no way free ourselves from our factual fallenness in the world but are freed from it only by an act of God ... the salvation occurrence that is realized in Christ." Bultmann remained convinced that the narratives of the life of Jesus offered theology in story form, teaching lessons in the familiar language of myth. They were not to be excluded, but given explanation so they could be understood for today. Bultmann thought faith should become a present-day reality. To Bultmann, the people of the world appeared to be always in disappointment and turmoil. Faith must be a determined vital act of will, not a culling and extolling of "ancient proofs". Bultmann said about salvation and eternity: "As from now on there are only believers and unbelievers, so there are also now only saved and lost, those who have life and those who are in death."

Bultmann carried form criticism so far as to call the historical value of the gospels into serious question. Despite that, Bultmann was an outspoken opponent of the Christ myth theory. In his book Jesus and the Word, he wrote:

"Of course the doubt as to whether Jesus really existed is unfounded and not worth refutation. No sane person can doubt that Jesus stands as founder behind the historical movement whose first distinct stage is represented by the oldest Palestinian community"

Concerning the relationship between body, soul, and Spirit, he affirmed a monistic point of view.

== Legacy and criticism ==
Bultmann was an outstanding teacher, and he encouraged independence of mind among his students. The result was two major developments within the “Bultmann school.” In 1954 Ernst Käsemann raised “the question of the historical Jesus” (i.e., the question of the significance of knowledge of the historical Jesus for Christian faith), and a number of Bultmann’s pupils developed a position independent of their teacher’s on the matter. Then Ernst Fuchs and Gerhard Ebeling, building on Bultmann’s existentialist analysis, developed a method of interpreting the New Testament that emphasized the linguistic mode of human existence, giving birth to the so-called new hermeneutic. Bultmann himself took part in these discussions along with his pupils for as long as his health permitted, later living quietly in Marburg, where he died in 1976.

Posthumously, Bultmann’s approach to the New Testament has been subject to increasing criticism, which has led modern scholars to question his theorems. According to the theologian and historian of Christianity Larry Hurtado, Bultmann "approached the ancient Christian texts with a theological criterion, a particular formulation of justification by faith, which he used to judge whether the writings were valid or not." John P. Meier believes that Bultmann had a "disconcerting way of solving problems with a few evasive sentences, his arguments do not hold up, despite having been handed down for generations." Bart D. Ehrman, while agreeing with some of Bultmann's positions, underlines that "among our ranks there are no more form critics that agree with the theories of Bultmann, the pioneer of this interpretation". According to Werner H. Kelber, "Today it is no exaggeration to claim that a whole spectrum of main assumptions underlying Bultmann's Synoptic Tradition must be considered suspect."

Bultmann's skeptical approach to the New Testament has received criticism from traditional biblical scholars like Klaus Berger and Craig Blomberg. Form criticism, in particular, has been challenged in recent years by Martin Hengel, Richard Bauckham and Brant J. Pitre, who have reasserted the traditional theory that the Gospels were written by eyewitnesses.

== Selected works ==
- Bultmann, Rudolf K. (1921). Die Geschichte der synoptischen Tradition. - German original
  - ——— (1976). History of the Synoptic Tradition. San Francisco, CA: Harper San Francisco. ISBN 0-06-061172-3. (seminal work on form criticism)
- ——— (1926). Jesus. - German original
  - ——— (1934). Jesus and the Word. Hudson River editions. New York & London: Scribner. ISBN 978-0-684-17596-6. OCLC 20362687.
- ——— (1941). Neues Testament und Mythologie. - German original
  - ——— (1953). Kerygma and Myth: A Theological Debate. London: SPCK. OCLC 878330612. - (contains the essay "The New Testament and Mythology" with critical analyses and Bultmann's response)
  - ——— (1984). The New Testament and Mythology and Other Basic Writings. Augsburg Fortress Press. ISBN 978-0-8006-0727-2. OCLC 10948632.
- ——— (1941). Das Evangelium des Johannes. - German original
  - ——— (1971). The Gospel of John: A Commentary. Philadelphia, PA: Westminster John Knox Press. ISBN 978-0-664-20893-6. OCLC 136267.
- ——— (1948). Theologie des Neuen Testaments. - German original
  - ——— (1961). Theology of the New Testament. London: SCM Press. OCLC 1069331668.
  - ——— (1970). Theology of the New Testament: Complete in One Volume. London: SCM Press. ISBN 978-0-684-41190-3. OCLC 715928440.
- ——— (1949). Das Urchristentum im Rahmen der Antiken Religionen. - German original
  - ——— (1956). Primitive Christianity in its Contemporary Setting. New York: Meridian Books. OCLC 280803.
- ——— (1954). Die Frage der Entmythologisierung. - German original
  - ———; Jaspers, Karl (1958). Myth & Christianity: An Inquiry Into The Possibility Of Religion Without Myth. New York: Noonday Press. OCLC 186641. - In this dialogue with philosopher Jaspers, Jaspers first makes the case that Christianity can not be understood apart from its mythical framework, and that myth is a necessary form of communication through symbol. Bultmann responds that modern scientific analysis of the text is required to separate the genuine from the miraculous claims, thereby revealing the true message.
- ——— (1957). History and Eschatology: The Presence of Eternity (1954–55 Gifford Lectures). Edinburgh: University Press. ISBN 978-0-85224-103-5. OCLC 752549.
- ——— (1958). Jesus Christ and Mythology (Cole lectures, Vanderbilt University, Kent Shaffer memorial lectures). Scribner Library (series) - Lyceum editions. Vol. SL73. New York & London: Scribner. ISBN 978-0-684-71727-2. OCLC 383108.
