= Sandra Savaglio =

Italian astrophysicist

- Savaglio at a book presentation, November 2018
- Born: 1967 (age 58–59); Cosenza, Italy
- Education: B.S. Physics (1991), PhD Physics (1995)
- Alma mater: University of Calabria (B.A.), University of Calabria (PhD)
- Awards: Casato Prime Donne Award (2014); Pythagoras Award, Italy(2008)
- Scientific career
- Fields: Astronomy, Astrophysicist
- Workplaces: European Southern Observatory, Johns Hopkins University, The Space Telescope Science Institute

Sandra Savaglio is an Italian astrophysicist whose research focuses on the "young universe: cosmic chemical evolution, distant galaxies, intergalactic and interstellar medium, and galaxies hosting the most energetic events in the universe: the gamma-ray bursts and the super luminous supernovae.

She embarked on tracing the origins of the galaxy. She graduated summa cum laude in physics in 1991 from University of Calabria and received her Ph.D. from the University of Calabria in Italy.

In January 2004 Savaglio was on the cover of Time magazine, as a symbol of many of Europe's scientists moving to the United States. Besides working in the U.S., Savaglio has worked at the Max Planck Institute for Extraterrestrial Physics in Garching, Germany.

After studying and working outside Italy for 23 years, she returned to Calabria and is a professor in astrophysics at the University of Calabria (Arcavacata di Rende, Italy). Upon returning to Calabria, she received the Casato Prime Donne Award on September 14, 2014, in Montalcino, Italy. She also received in 2008 the Pythagoras Award, Italy.

== Early life ==
Savaglio was born in Cosenza, Calabria, and grew up in Marano Marchesato, a small town nearby, Italy. The daughter of a postal worker and a midwife, she is the youngest of four children. Her passion for the stars started when she was 17 years old after she read Exploring the Earth and the Cosmos by Isaac Asimov. "My father is one of my greatest fans. My parents, with me, my sister and my brothers, have never set limits to our aspirations." She enjoyed physics in high school and university.

She attended University of Calabria and received her B.S. in physics in 1991. In fact Savaglio is now a professor University of Calabria in the same department she received her Ph.D.

== Career ==
Savaglio research has centered around the young universe: distant galaxies and cosmic chemical evolution, GRB (gamma-ray bursts) and super luminous supernovae. In university Savaglio worked with Riccardo Giacconi, between 1996 and 1998, who would win the Physics Nobel Prize in 2002. From there, after a brief post-doc in France, Savaglio moved on to Johns Hopkins University from September 2001 to February 2006, where she taught courses and worked with Prof. Karl Glazebrook. She taught courses at Johns Hopkins University in Baltimore. She also worked with Space Telescope Science Institute while in Baltimore.

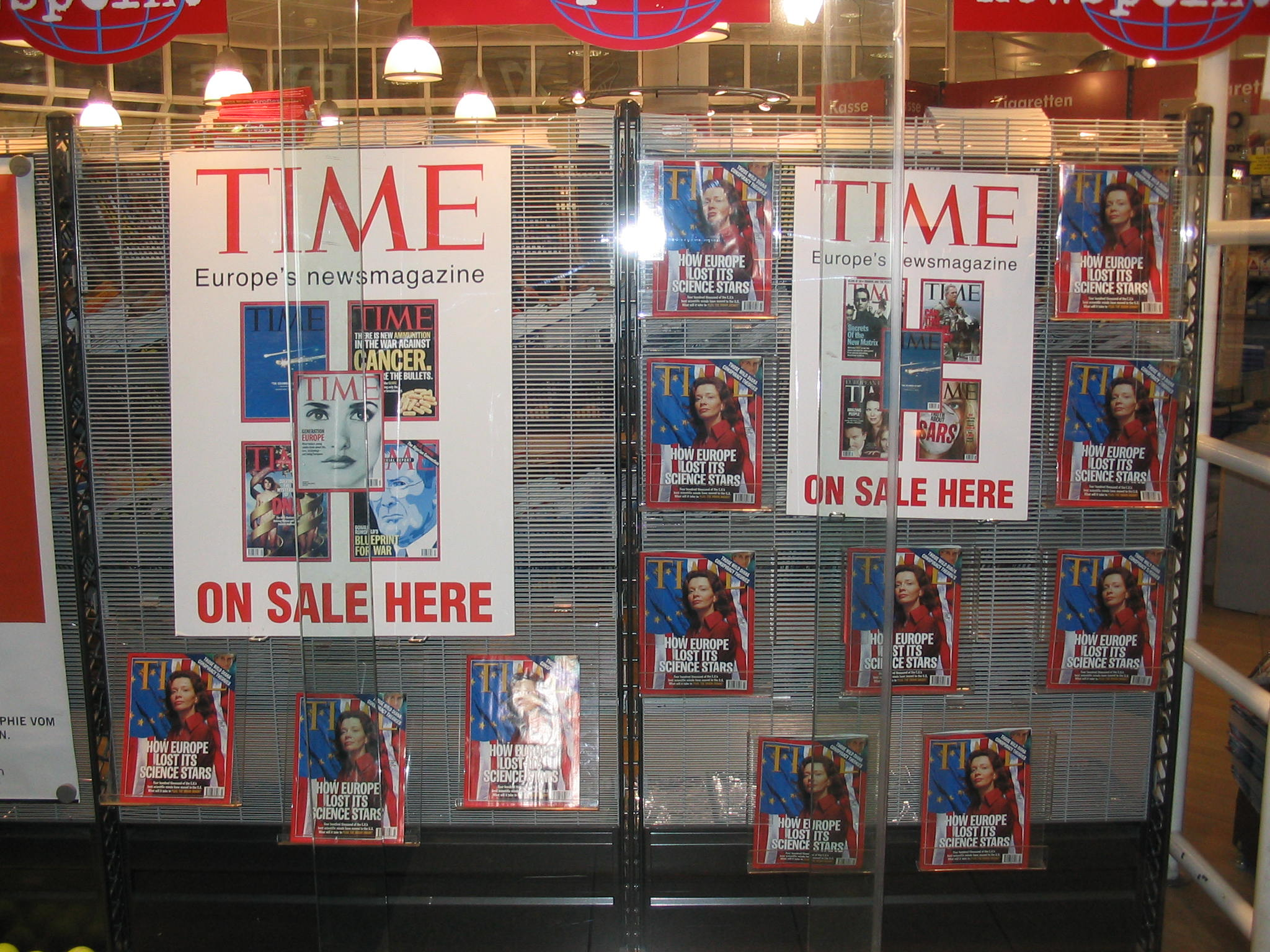
Shopwindow

In 2006 Savaglio moved to Max Planck Institute for Extraterrestrial Physics where she was a fellow and senior research scientist. She created the SQL database for Gamma-Ray Burst Host Studies (GHostS), the largest public database dedicated to galaxies hosting gamma-ray burst events. Savaglio was active in the "Gemini Deep Deep Survey" which returned results on the metallicity of early galaxies and the evolution of spherical galaxies and why many appear old.

Savaglio has been active in her community since she has returned to Southern Italy. Savaglio has promoted both science and women in science. She has discussed both topics in several interviews and also visited local high schools. Being asked interviews why she came back to Italy, she responded that yes Italy does not support the sciences at the level many other countries do, however she stresses the culture, social interactions, and food of Southern Italy. One of the reasons for her return to Italy from Germany was the price of pumpkin flowers, which on returning she can get from uncle's garden. She is also happy to finally eat true tomatoes; in Germany the tomatoes would make my father turn in his grave. She likes to make a few of the recipes of my grandmother, that give me a sense of the my origin: for example the 'mustazzuoli'. A disadvantage was leaving her partner, Uta Grothkopf, in Germany and the need for Uta or Sandra to commute to see each. Also because Italy does not recognize Civil Unions (Eingetragene Partnerschaft) if Savaglio dies in Italy Uta would not have a right to her pension."

Carbone Vincenzo and Savaglio wrote a paper in 2001 on sports records. The study shows "that the mean speed as a function of race time can be described by two scaling laws that have a breakpoint at about 150–170 seconds (corresponding to the ≈1,000 m race). We interpret this as being the transition time between anaerobic and aerobic energy expenditure by athletes." Savaglio been active in soccer and competitive swimming.

Savaglio has also written two books: Tutto l'universo per chi ha poco spazio-tempo (publisher: Mondadori), and with Mario Caligiuri Senza attendere (publisher: by Rubbettino). Both are only in Italian.

== Articles ==
=== Gemini deep deep survey ===
- The Gemini deep deep survey II, metals in star-forming galaxies at redshift 1.3 less than z less than 2; Sandra Savaglio, Karl Glazebrook, Roberto G. Abraham, David Crampton, Hsiao-Wen Chen, Patrick J. McCarthy, Inger Jorgensen, Kathy Roth, Isobel Hook, Ronald O. Marzke, Richard Murowinski; The Astrophysical Journal; 27 Oct 2003: arXiv:astro-ph/0310437
- The Gemini deep deep survey I, introduction to the survey, catalogs, and composite spectra; Roberto G. Abraham, Karl Glazebrook, Patrick J. McCarthy, David Crampton, Richard Murowinski, Inger Jorgensen, Kathy Roth, Isobel M. Hook, Sandra Savaglio, Hsiao-Wen Chen, Ronald O. Marzke, R. G. Carlberg; The Astronomical Journal; 18 Feb 2004: arXiv:astro-ph/0402436
- The Gemini deep deep survey, III. A high abundance of massive galaxies 3-6 billion years after the Big Bang; Karl Glazebrook, Roberto G. Abraham, Patrick J. McCarthy, Sandra Savaglio, Hsiao-Wen Chen, David Crampton, Rick Murowinski, Inger Jørgensen, Kathy Roth, Isobel Hook, Ronald O. Marzke & R. G. Carlberg; Nature; 8 July 2004:

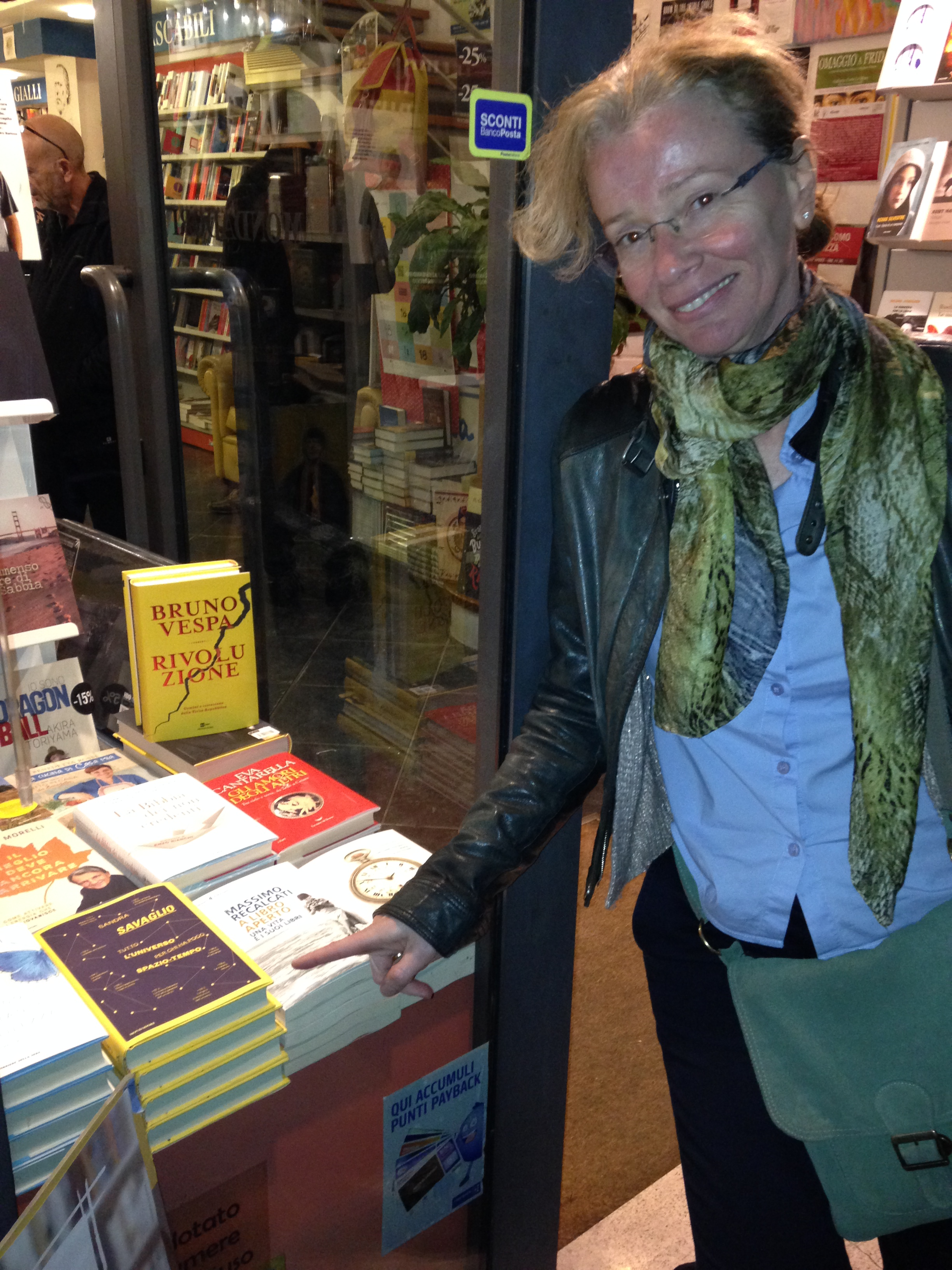
Shopwindow of Mondadori bookstore in Cosenza.

- Evolved galaxies at z > 1.5 from the Gemini deep deep survey: the formation epoch of massive stellar systems; Patrick J. McCarthy, Damien Le Borgne, David Crampton, Hsiao-Wen Chen, Roberto G. Abraham, Karl Glazebrook, Sandra Savaglio, Raymond G. Carlberg, Ronald O. Marzke, Kathy Roth; The Astrophysical Journal; 13 Sept 2004:
- The Gemini deep deep survey, VII: the redshift evolution of the mass-metallicity relation; Sandra Savaglio, Karl Glazebrook, Damien Le Borgne, Stephanie Juneau, Roberto G. Abraham, Hsiao-Wen Chen, David Crampton, Patrick J. McCarthy, Ray G. Carlberg, Ronald O. Marzke, Kathy Roth, Inger Jorgensen, Richard Murowinski; The Astrophysical Journal Letters; 18 Aug 2005: arXiv:astro-ph/0508407
- The Gemini deep deep survey, VI: massive Hδ-strong Galaxies at z 1; Damien Le Borgne, Roberto Abraham, Kathryne Daniel, Patrick J. McCarthy, Karl Glazebrook, Sandra Savaglio, David Crampton, Stéphanie Juneau, Ray G. Carlberg, Hsiao-Wen Chen, Ronald O. Marzke, Kathy Roth, Inger Jørgensen, Richard Murowinski; The Astrophysical Journal, 642:48–62; 1 May 2006:
- The Gemini deep deep survey, VIII : when did early-type galaxies form?; Roberto G. Abraham, Preethi Nair, Patrick J. McCarthy, Karl Glazebrook, Erin Mentuch, Haojing Yan, Sandra Savaglio, David Crampton, Richard Murowinski, Stephanie Juneau, Damien Le Borgne, R. G. Carlberg, Inger Jørgensen, Kathy Roth, Hsiao-Wen Chen, and Ronald O. Marzke; The Astrophysical Journal, 669; 1 Nov. 2007:

=== Cosmic chemical evolution ===
- Super-solar metal abundances in two galaxies at z ~ 3.57 revealed by the GRB 090323 Afterglow Spectrum; Sandra Savaglio, A. Rau, J. Greiner, T. Kruhler, S. McBreen, D. H. Hartmann, A. C. Updike, R. Filgas, S. Klose, P. Afonso, C. Clemens, A. Kupcu Yoldas, F. Olivares E., V. Sudilovsky, G. Szokoly; Monthly Notices of the Royal Astronomical Society; 20 Feb.2011:arXiv:1110.4642
- On the mass-metallicity relation, velocity dispersion, and gravitational well depth of GRB host galaxies; Maryam Arabsalmani, Palle Møller, Johan P. U. Fynbo, Lise Christensen, Wolfram Freudling, Sandra Savaglio, Tayyaba Zafar; Monthly Notices of the Royal Astronomical Society, v446 n1; 15 Oct. 2014: arXiv:1410.3510
- The power spectrum of the Lyman-α clouds; Luca Amendola; Sandra Savaglio; Monthly Notices of the Royal Astronomical Society, 309, no. 3, pa. 576; 12 May 1999: arXiv:astro-ph/9905130

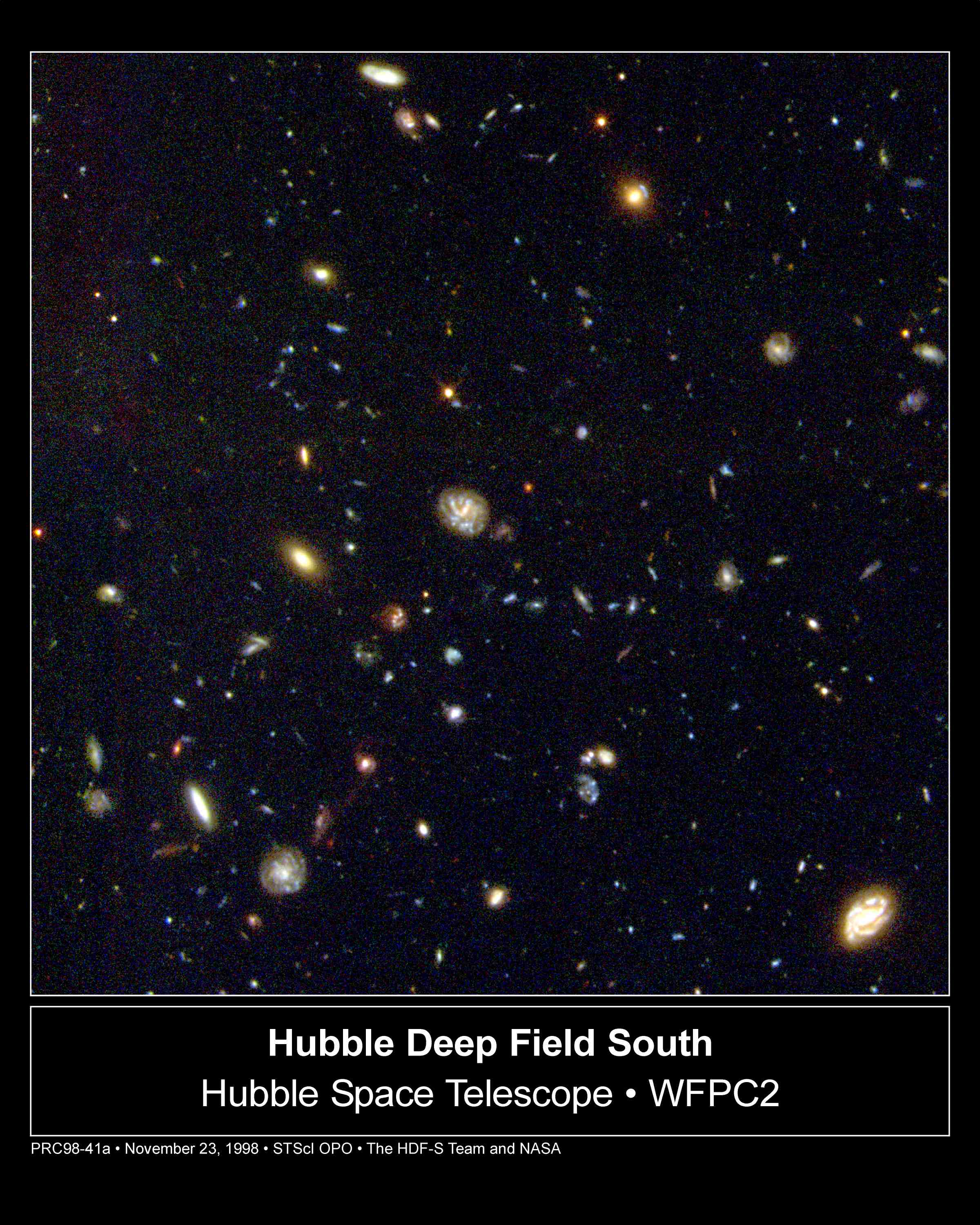
HubbleDeepFieldSouth

=== The Hubble Deep Field South ===
- The Lyman-α forest of the QSO in the Hubble Deep Field South; Sandra Savaglio, Henry Ferguson, Thomas Brown, Brian Espey, Kailash Sahu, Stefi Baum, C. M. Carollo, Mary Elizabeth Kaiser, Massimon Stiavelli, Robert Williams, Jennifer Wilson; The Astrophysical Journal Letters; 5 Feb 1999: arXiv:astro-ph/9901022
- The Hubble deep field south: STIS imaging; Jonathan P. Gardner, Stefi A. Baum, Thomas M. Brown, C. Marcella Carollo, Jennifer Christensen, Ilana Dashevsky, Mark E. Dickinson, Brian R. Espey, Henry C. Ferguson, Andrew S. Fruchter; Anne M. Gonnella, Rosa A. González-Lópezlira, Richard N. Hook, Mary Elizabeth Kaiser, Crystal L. Martin, Kailash C. Sahu, Sandra Savaglio, T. Ed Smith, Harry I. Teplitz, Robert E. Williams, Jennifer Wilson; The Astronomical Journal, v119 n2; Feb. 2000:
- Hubble space telescope observations of the associated absorption-line systems in Q0122+0338; Casey Papovich, Colin A. Norman, David V. Bowen, Tim Heckman, Sandra Savaglio, Anton M. Koekemoer, J. Chris Blades; The Astrophysical Journal Letters, Volume 531, Number 2; 10 March 2000:
- The Hubble deep field south: formulation of the observing campaign; The Astronomical Journal, Volume 120, Number 6; December 2000;

=== Gamma ray burst ===
- Heavy-Element abundances and dust depletions in the host galaxies of three gamma-ray bursts; Sandra Savaglio, S. Michael Fall, Fabrizio Fiore; The Astrophysical Journal Letters, v585 n2; 2003 Mar 10:
- Dust depletion and extinction in a gamma-ray burst afterglow: Sandra Savaglio, S. Michael Fall; The Astrophysical Journal Letters; 10 October 2004;
- GRBs as cosmological probes: cosmic chemical evolution; Sandra Savaglio; New Journal of Physics; Sept. 2006: arXiv:astro-ph/0609489
- Intervening Metal Systems in GRB and QSO Sight Lines: The Mg; Vladimir Sudilovsky, Sandra Savaglio, Paul Vreeswijk, Cedric Ledoux, Alain Smette, Jochen Greiner; The Astrophysical Journal, Volume 669, Number 2; 10 Nov. 2007:
- Low-Mass and Metal-Poor Gamma-Ray Burst Host Galaxies; Sandra Savaglio; International Astronomical Union, v4 nS255; 21 Aug 2008: arXiv:0808.2917
- The galaxy population hosting gamma-Ray bursts; Sandra Savaglio, K. Glazebrook, D. Le Borgne; The Astrophysical Journal; 29 Dec. 2008: arXiv:0803.2718

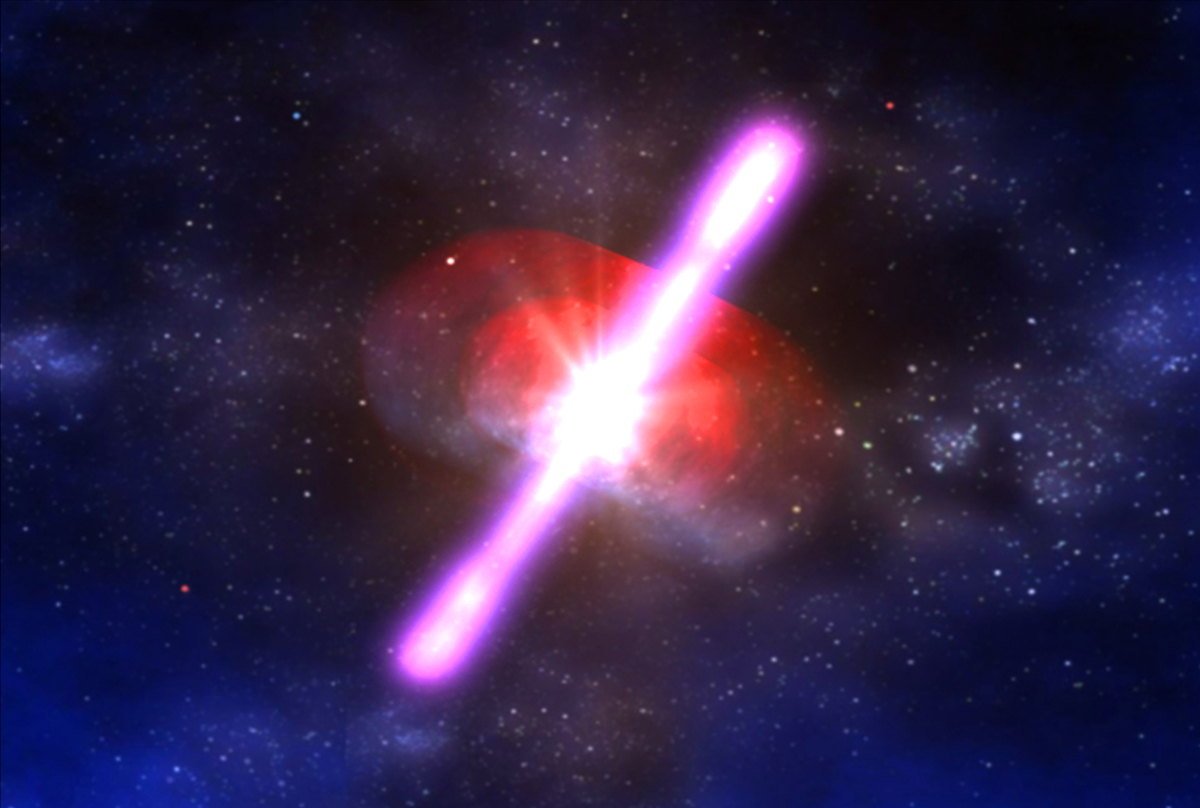
Gamma-ray-burst-illustration

- GRB 060605: multi-wavelength analysis of the first GRB observed using integral field spectroscopy; P. Ferrero, S. Klose, D. A. Kann, S. Savaglio, S. Schulze, E. Palazzi, E. Maiorano, P. Böhm, D. Grupe, S. R. Oates, S. F. Sánchez, L. Amati, J. Greiner, J. Hjorth, D. Malesani, S. D. Barthelmy, J. Gorosabel, N. Masetti, M. M. Roth; Astronomy and Astrophysics, Volume 497, Number 3; 12 February 2009:
- The extremely red host galaxy of GRB 080207; Leslie Hunt, Eliana Palazzi, Andrea Rossi, Sandra Savaglio, Giovanni Cresci, Sylvio Klose, Michal Michalowski, Elena Pian; The Astrophysical Journal Letters, v736 n2; 1 Aug. 2011:arXiv:1106.3988
- Gamma-ray burst host galaxies at low and high redshift; Sandra Savaglio; Astronomische Nachrichten; 18 Jan. 2012: arXiv:1201.3730
- Clustering of galaxies around GRB sight-lines; Vladimir Sudilovsky, Jochen Greiner, Arne Rau, Mara Salvato, Sandra Savaglio, S. D. Vergani, P. Schady, Jonny Elliott, T. Kruehler, D. A. Kann, Sylvio Klose, A. Rossi, Robert Filgas, Sebastian Schmidl; Astronomy & Astrophysics, Volume 552, id.A143, 8 pp; 26 Feb, 2012:
- Unveiling the fundamental properties of Gamma-ray burst host galaxies; Sandra Savaglio; International Astronomical Union, Vol 279, p. 212-215; Sept. 2012:
- Gamma-Ray bursts trace UV metrics of star formation over 3 > z ~ 5; J. Greiner, D. B. Fox, P. Schady, T. Krühler, M. Trenti, A. Cikota, J. Bolmer, J. Elliott, C. Delvaux, R. Perna, P. Afonso, D. A. Kann, S. Klose, S. Savaglio, S. Schmidl, T. Schweyer, M. Tanga, K. Varela; The Astrophysical Journal Letters, v809 n1; 10 Aug. 2015:
- A very luminous magnetar-powered supernova associated with an ultra-long gamma-ray burst; Jochen Greiner, Paolo A. Mazzali, D. Alexander Kann, Thomas Krühler, Elena Pian, Simon Prentice, Felipe Olivares E., Andrea Rossi, Sylvio Klose, Stefan Taubenberger, Fabian Knust, Paulo M.J. Afonso, Chris Ashall, Jan Bolmer, Corentin Delvaux, Roland Diehl, Jonathan Elliott, Robert Filgas, Johan P.U. Fynbo, John F. Graham, Ana Nicuesa Guelbenzu, Shiho Kobayashi, Giorgos Leloudas, Sandra Savaglio, Patricia Schady, Sebastian Schmid, Tassilo Schweyer, Vladimir Sudilovsky, Mohit Tanga, Adria C. Updike, Hendrik van Eerten, Karla Varela; Nature volume 523, pages 189–192: 10 Sep 2015: arXiv:1509.03279
- Probing dust-obscured star formation in the most massive gamma-ray burst host galaxies; Jochen Greiner, Michal􏰀 J. Micha􏰀lowski, Sylvio Klose, Leslie K. Hunt, Gianfranco Gentile, Peter Kamphuis, Rub ́en Herrero-Illana, Mark Wieringa, Thomas Kru ̈hler, Patricia Schady, Jonathan Elliott1, John F. Graham, Eduardo Ibar, Fabian Knust, Ana Nicuesa Guelbenzu, Eliana Palazzi, Andrea Rossi, Sandra Savaglio; Astronomy & Astrophysics; 29 September 2018: arXiv:1606.08285

=== Galaxy evolution ===
- When do early-type galaxies form?; Roberto G. Abraham, Patrick J. McCarthy, Erin Mentuch, Karl Glazebrook, Preethi Nair, Jean-Ren ́e Gauthier, Sandra Savaglio, David Crampton, Stephanie Juneau, Richard Murowinski, Damien Le Borgne, R. G. Carlberg, Inger Jørgensen, Kathy Roth, Hsiao-Wen Chen, Ronald O. Marzke; International Astronomical Union; 10 Nov 2006: arXiv:astro-ph/0611322
- The evolution of galaxy dust properties for 1<z<2.5; Stefan Noll, Daniele Pierini, Maurilio Pannella, Sandra Savaglio; 4 Dec. 2006: arXiv:astro-ph/0612080
- The cosmic evolution of dust-corrected metallicity in the neutral gas; Annalisa De Cia; Cédric Ledoux; Patrick Petitjean; Sandra Savaglio; Astronomy & Astrophysics, v611; 14 Mar 2018: arXiv:1709.06578

== Awards ==
- International Award "Vittorio De Sica" (Rome, November 2016)
- International Award Frescobaldi (Milan, October 2015)
- International Award Pericle d'Oro (Reggio di Calabria, July 2015)
- International Award Casato Prime Donne along with the first Italian female Astronaut, Samantha Cristoforetti. (Montalcino, 14 September 2014)
- Leonardo Award, IV Edition, Associazione Croce del Sud, Salerno, September 2011
- Pythagoras Award, Italy (February 2008)
- Primio Simpatia 2016 (Reggio Calabria, September 2016)
- FI.DA.PA. Award Woman of the South, Italy (June 2005)

== Conference and seminar organization ==
- XXIII International Symposium: "Nuclei in the Cosmos", SOC: Zs. Fülöp et al., Debrecen (Hungary), July 2014
- Groupement De Recherche Européen (GDRE) (English: European Research Group) workshop,"Cosmic SFR, stellar mass, metallicity as traced by GRBs, from the local universe to z = 8", chair: S. Savaglio, Garching (Germany), January 2010 / Rome (Italy) January 2011
- IAU General Assembly 2009 Joint Discussion: "The First Galaxies: Theoretical Predictions and Observational Clues", SOC: V. Bromm et al., Rio de Janeiro (Brazil), August 2009

== Gender conferences ==
- Discriminazione di genere nelle discipline di STEM, University Della Calabria, 12 December 2018
- One day meeting: "Outsider within – Gender and Science", for the 20th anniversary of the Centre of Women's Studies "Milly Villa, at University of Calabria, chair: Giovanna Vingelli, 12 December 2017. Among the many guests, Piera Levi-Montalcini, of the Livia-Montalcini Foundation.
- Women & Science, with Maria Cristina Pedicchio, presented by Eliana Liotta, Trieste Next, Trieste, September 2017
- One-day meeting: "Female astrophysicists from Calabria", attended by 500 high-school students, aimed at promoting the image of female scientists and providing role models for young girls who have interests in STEM career, SOC: A. Greco, S. Perri, S. Savaglio, G. Zimbardo, University of Calabria (Arcavacata, Italy), 29 October 2015

== Popular events ==
- "Da Matera all'Universo e ritorno, un viaggio da vertigine tra galassie e frattali", Materadio 2018, Globale-Locale, with Sandra Lucente, Matera (Italy), September 2018
- Supernovae: Creation and destruction, the two sides of Comic Explosions, Tropea Festival Reading & Writing, Vibo Valentia (Italy), October 2017
- Supernovae: Creation and destruction, the two sides of Comic Explosions, National Geographic Science Festival, Rome, May 2017
- "Le stelle fisse e la fissa delle stelle: due astrofisiche a confronto", Time of books, Milan, April 2017
- Cosmic explosions: supernovae & gamma-ray bursts, Messina (Italy), February 2017
- "Research: Predictions for the Future", Festival of Generations: "Beyond Frontiers: Generations and Cultures", Florence, October 2016
- Comets, asteroids and meteors, the fascinating world of what gives life and destruction, for the series "Fridays of the Universe", Ferrara (Italy), March 2016
- XOff Lecce (Italy), October 2014, closing talk of the 4-days event, title: "The Future"
- Cosmic Explosions, keynote speaker at the Wired Next Fest, Milan (Italy), May 2014

== International science teams ==
- GRAWITA – GRAvitational Wave Inaf TeAm (2018 – present)
- THOR – Turbulence Heating ObserverR (ESA M4 mission, 2015 – 2019)
- THESEUS – Transient High Energy Sources and Early Universe Surveyor (ESA M5 mission, 2014 – present)
- EELT-HIRES – High Resolution Spectrograph at the European Extremely Large Telescope (2012 – present)
- GHostS – GRB Host Studies (2005 – present, PI: S. Savaglio)

== Advisory committees ==
- Scientific Council of the Istituto Nazionale di Astrofisica (INAF, May 2020 – August 2024)
- Councilor of the Calabria Region for Research, University and Education (February 2020 – October 2021)
- Astronomy Archives User Group (AAUG) for the European Space Agency (ESA, June 2018 – present)
- National Scientific Abilitation – Committee member (November 2016 – August 2018)
- Galileo Award President of the Jury for the selection of the finalists – 12th edition (Padua, February 2018)
- Hubble Space Telescope Time Allocation Committee – Cycle 8, Cycle 17, Cycle 19, Cycle 22, Cycle 23, Cycle 25
- Gemini Telescope, Canadian Time Allocation, external referee (May 2003)
- Chair of Cosmology Panel and Observing Programmes Committee member at the European Southern Observatory – P89/P90 (November 2011 – May 2012)
- European Southern Observatory, Observing Programmes Committee – Periods P85/P87(November 2009 / November 2010), Panel: Cosmology
