= Saraceno =

Saraceno is a surname. Notable people with the surname include:

- Benedetto Saraceno (born 1948), Italian psychiatrist
- Blues Saraceno (born 1971), American rock musician
- Clara Saraceno (born 1983), Argentine-born laser scientist
- Giovanni Saraceno (died 1280), Italian Catholic archbishop
- Joe Saraceno (1931–2015), American record producer
- Sigismondo Saraceno (died 1585), Italian Catholic archbishop
- Tomás Saraceno (born 1973), Argentine contemporary artist
- Vittorio Saraceno, 18th-century Italian economist and numismatist

== See also ==
- Villa Saraceno, 16th-century Palladian villa in Italy commissioned by the Saraceno family
