= Sofia Kovalevskaya Award =

The Alexander von Humboldt Foundation of Germany bestowed the Sofia Kovalevskaya Award from 2002 to 2020. Sofia Kovalevskaya (1850–1891) was the first major Russian female mathematician, who made important contributions to mathematical analysis, differential equations and mechanics, and the first woman appointed to a full professorship in Northern Europe. This prestigious award named in her honor was given to promising young academics to pursue their line of research in the sciences or arts and humanities. The foundation encouraged applications from all areas of learning so long as the applicant had received a Ph.D. in the previous six years and could be categorized as "top flight" by their publications and experience as commensurate with age.

There have been a total 139 awardees since the inception of the Sofia Kovalevskaya Award in 2002 until its closure in 2020. Individual awards totalled up to 1.6 million Euro each. Funds were awarded to build and lead a team of researchers for a five-year period within a German host institution.

== Award winners ==
- 2002: Tiziana Boffa Ballaran, Anne Bouloumié, Luc Bovens, Stephane Charlot, Volker Deckert, Paolo D'Iorio, Oliver Eickelberg, Michael Feiginov, Michael Gotthardt, Stefan Hecht, Daniel Hofstetter, Judith Klein-Seetharaman, Manuel Koch, Yuriy Makhlin, Matilde Marcolli, Krzysztof Oplustil, Kawon Oum, Jane Elizabeth Parker, Maxim Polyakov, Alexander Pukhov, Tina Romeis, Luis Santos, Jochen M. Schneider, Joachim Schultze, Eva Stoger, Greg J. Stuart, Gleb Sukhorukov, Grigori Vajenine, Zhong Zhang
- 2004: Lucas Brunsveld, Yanbei Chen, Ferdinando Cicalese, Michal Czakon, Mark Depauw, Brian Hare, Jian-Wei Pan, Tricia Striano, Doris Y. Tsao, Eckhard von Törne, Martin Wilmking
- 2006: Jens Bredenbeck, Jure Demsar, Felix Engel, Natalia Filatkina, Olga Holtz, Reinhard Kienberger, Marga Cornelia Lensen, Martin Lövden, Thomas Misgeld, Benjamin Schlein, Taolei Sun
- 2008: Cinzia Casiraghi (physics), Karl Sebastian Lang (medicine), Esther Lutgens (medicine), Nathan MacDonald (biblical theology), Daniele Oriti (physics), Jan-Erik Siemens (neurophysiology), Mirka Uhlirova (molecular genetics), Aleksi Vuorinen (physics)
- 2010: Isabel Bäurle, Lapo Bogani, Camin Dean, Christian Doeller, Brandon Dotson, Gustavo Fernandez Huertas, Jörn Fischer, Christiana Fountoulakis Mäsch, Jörg Fröbisch, Joseph Hennawi, Shigeyoshi Inoue, Eike Kiltz, Philipp Alexander Lang, Pierpaolo Mastrolia, Andreas Möglich, Simone Pika, Roberto Rinaldi, Dmitry Volodkin
- 2012: Pavel Buividovich, Dmitry A. Fedosov, Tanja Gaich, Kerstin Kaufmann, Liu Na, Veronika Lukacs-Kornek, Ulf A. Orom, Miriam Ronzoni, Patricia Schady, Richard Stancliffe, Athanasios Typas, Samuel Wagner, Nils B. Weidmann, Yan Yu
- 2014: Kamal Asadi, Gregory Brennecka, Elizabeta Briski, Pierangelo Buongiorno, Jason Dexter, Katja Dörschner-Boyaci, Roland Donninger, Fernando Febres Cordero, Helen May-Simera, Christian Straßer, Renske Marjan van der Veen
- 2015: Rikkert Frederix, Mikhail Kudryashev, Karin Lind, Ioan M. Pop, Clara Saraceno, Zhuang Xiaoying
- 2016: Mazhar Ali, Michal P. Heller, Francesco Neri, Faith Osier, William Shepherd, Safa Shoai
- 2017: Ufuk Günesdogan, Enrique Jiménez, Laura Leal-Taixé, David J. E. Marsh, Anna Martius, Matteo Smerlak
- 2018: Aydan Bulut-Karslioglu, Kenji Fukushima, Milica Gašić, Hitoshi Omori, Paola Pinilla, Fritz Renner
- 2019: Tonni Grube Andersen, Joshua P. Barham, Jan De Graaf, Angelo Di Bernardo, Doris Hellerschmied, Ottaviano Ruesch
- 2020: Marcia de Almeida Monteiro Melo Ferraz, Danila Barskiy, Agnieszka Golicz, Gregory Maurice Green, André F. Martins, Mar Rus-Calafell, Torben Schiffner
