= Falling Walls =

Annual science event in Berlin, Germany

The Falling Walls Science Summit (previously Falling Walls Conference) is an annual science event in Berlin, Germany, which takes place from 7th to 9th of November and coincides with the anniversary of the Fall of the Berlin Wall. With the theme "Which are the next walls to fall in science and society?". The summit involves three days of presentations, discussions, and debates.

== History ==
After the inaugural 2009 conference organized by the Einstein Foundation, an independent non-profit institution by the name of the Falling Walls Foundation was established through the support of the German Ministry of Education and Research and the Berlin Senator for Education, Science and Research. The foundation gas been managed by Tatjana König. Professor Sebastian Turner, a Berlin entrepreneur who publishes the Tagesspiegel, has served on the board of trustees of the foundation.

== Speakers ==
=== 2017 ===
- Alexander Betts, University of Oxford
- Sarah Chayes, Carnegie Endowment for International Peace
- Esther Duflo, Massachusetts Institute of Technology (MIT)
- Dennis Lo, Chinese University of Hong Kong
- W.E. Moerner, Stanford University
- Jian-Wei Pan, University of Science and Technology of China
- Edgar Pieterse, University of Cape Town
- Jürgen Schmidhuber, Swiss AI Lab
- Christina Smolke, Stanford University

=== 2016 ===
- Quarraisha Abdool Karim, CAPRISA, Durban
- Kevin Bales, University of Nottingham
- Neil Gershenfeld, Massachusetts Institute of Technology
- Rob Knight, University of California, San Diego
- Lim Chuan Poh, A*STAR, Singapore
- Randolph Nesse, Arizona State University
- Peter Neumann, King's College London
- Hélène Rey, London Business School
- Katherine Richardson, University of Copenhagen
- Eyal Weizman, Goldsmiths, University of London

=== 2015 ===
- June Andrews, University of Stirling, UK
- Bruce A. Beutler, University of Texas Southwestern Medical Center, USA
- Emmanuelle Charpentier, Max Planck Institute for Infection Biology, Germany
- Ottmar Edenhofer, Potsdam Institute for Climate Impact Research, Germany
- Nilüfer Göle, École des Hautes Études en Sciences Sociales, France
- Demis Hassabis, Google DeepMind, London, UK
- Dirk Helbing, ETH Zurich, Switzerland
- Naila Kabeer, London School of Economics and Political Science, UK
- Wolfgang Ketterle, Massachusetts Institute of Technology, USA
- Nina Kraus, Northwestern University, USA
- Joanne Liu, Médecins Sans Frontières, Switzerland
- Saskia Sassen, Columbia University, New York City
- Brian Schmidt, Australian National University
- Jackie Yi-Ru Ying, Institute of Bioengineering and Nanotechnology, Singapore
- Jean-Pierre Bourguignon, President, European Research Council (Session Host)
- Rush D. Holt, CEO, American Association for the Advancement of Science (Session Host)
- Johanna Wanka, German Federal Minister of Education and Research (Official Opening)

=== 2014 ===
- David Chipperfield, David Chipperfield Architects
- Karl Deisseroth, Stanford University, USA
- Stefan Hell, Max Planck Institute for Biophysical Chemistry, Germany
- Lisa Kaltenegger, Cornell University, USA
- Christof Koch, Allen Institute for Brain Science, USA
- Nathan S. Lewis, California Institute of Technology, USA
- Mariana Mazzucato, University of Sussex, UK
- Svante Pääbo, Max Planck Institute for Evolutionary Anthropology, Germany
- Alan Rusbridger, Former Editor-in-Chief of The Guardian, UK
- Thierry Zomahoun, African Institute for Mathematical Sciences (AIMS), South Africa
- Anton Zeilinger, University of Vienna, Austria
- Diane Griffin, vice-president of the United States National Academy of Sciences (Session Host)
- Angela Merkel, Chancellor of the Federal Republic of Germany (Official Opening)
- Sir Paul Nurse, President of the Royal Society, UK (Session Host)
- Rupert Stadler, CEO, AUDI AG, Germany (Dinner speech)
- Philippe Taquet, President of the French Academy of Sciences (Session Host)
- Lev Zelenyi, Vice President of the Russian Academy of Sciences (Session Host)

=== 2013 ===
- Jagdish N. Bhagwati, Columbia University, USA
- Olafur Eliasson, artist
- Jill Farrant, University of Cape Town, South Africa
- Stephen Friend, President Sage Bionetworks, USA
- Anita Goel, CEO Nanobiosym, USA
- Rolf-Dieter Heuer, CERN, Switzerland
- Jules A. Hoffmann, Université de Strasbourg, France
- Robert P. Kirshner, Harvard University, USA
- Daniel G. Nocera, Harvard University, USA
- Onora O'Neill, Baroness O'Neill of Bengarve, University of Cambridge, UK
- Mark Pagel, University of Reading, UK
- Dan Shechtman, Technion – Israel Institute of Technology, Israel
- Salil Shetty, Secretary General Amnesty International, UK
- Luc Steels, Universitat Pompeu Fabra Barcelona, Spain
- Ai Weiwei, artist

=== 2012 ===
- David Awschalom, University of California, Santa Barbara
- Monique Breteler, Harvard School of Public Health in Boston
- Michael Bruter, London School of Economics
- Philip Campbell, Nature Publishing Group
- Awa Marie Coll-Seck, Senegal's Health Minister
- David Harel, The Weizmann Institute of Science, Israel
- Michel D. Kazatchkine, UN Special Envoy for HIV/Aids in Eastern Europe and Central Asia
- Alan I. Leshner, AAAS and Science
- Daniel Libeskind, Architect
- Helga Nowotny, European Research Council (ERC), Vienna
- Ina Schieferdecker, Fraunhofer FOKUS/Technische Universität Berlin
- Hal Varian, Google Inc.
- Daniel Zajfman, Weizmann Institute of Science, Israel

=== 2011 ===
- Anastasia Ailamaki, École Polytechnique Fédérale de Lausanne
- Nick Barton, Institute of Science and Technology, Austria
- Aaron Ciechanover, Technion
- Robert Darnton, Harvard University
- Ingrid Daubechies, Duke University
- Robert E. Horn, Stanford University
- Wang Hui, Tsinghua University, Beijing
- Mary Kaldor, London School of Economics
- Ferenc Krausz, Max Planck Institute for Quantum Optics Munich
- Angela Merkel, Chancellor of the Federal Republic of Germany
- Helga Nowotny, European Research Council (ERC), Vienna
- Kõji Omi, The Science and Technology in Society (STS) forum Kyoto
- Annette Schavan, German Federal Minister of Education and Research
- Dennis J. Snower, the Kiel Institute for the World Economy
- Cédric Villani, Université de Lyon
- Stewart Wallis, nef (the new economics foundation), London

=== 2010 ===
- Dalton Conley, Sociologist
- Frederick Cooper, historian
- Helmut Dosch, Physicist
- Olafur Eliasson, artist
- Doug Guthrie, Dean of The George Washington University School of Business
- Olga Holtz, mathematician
- Reinhard Hüttl, President at acatech
- Thomas Lengauer, Director at the Max Planck Institute for Informatics
- Yves Leterme, Prime Minister of Belgium
- Karl Ulrich Mayer, President of the Leibniz Association
- Jürgen Mlynek, President of the Helmholtz Association
- Annette Schavan, professor, German Federal Minister of Education and Research
- Sabine Schmidtke, professor, Center for Advanced Judaic Studies, University of Pennsylvania
- Christian Wulff, President of Germany

=== 2009 ===
- Jutta Allmendinger
- Alain Aspect
- Michel Brunet
- Dipesh Chakrabarty
- John-Dylan Haynes
- Rolf-Dieter Heuer
- Harold James (historian)
- Angela Merkel
- Amélie Mummendey
- Miguel Nicolelis
- Tricia Striano
- Wendelin Werner
- Thomas Wiegand
- Muhammad Yunus
