= Anne Schreiter =

Social scientist (born 1984)

- Born: 1984 (age 41–42)
- Education: University of St. Gallen (Ph.D.); Shanghai International Studies University; Nanjing University; Berlin University of the Arts (Diploma)
- Known for: German-Chinese Business Communication; Science Management
- Scientific career
- Fields: Social Science; Science Management
- Workplaces: Guidance, Skills & Opportunities for Researchers e.V. (GSO); University of California, Berkeley
- Thesis: Das alltägliche Fremde. Eine interdisziplinäre Analyse deutsch-chinesischer Arbeitswelten (2014)
- Website: GSO

Anne Schreiter is a social scientist and the managing director of Guidance, Skills & Opportunities for Researchers e.V. (GSO), a German non-profit organization that advocates for researchers and scientists, offering programs and training for academics to build impactful careers – in academia and beyond.

== Education ==
From 2002 to 2007, Schreiter studied Communication in Social and Economic Contexts at the Berlin University of the Arts and Chinese Language and Culture in Nanjing and Shanghai. Sequentially, Schreiter earned her Ph.D. in Organization Studies and Cultural Theory at the University of St. Gallen in Switzerland from 2009 to 2013. Her dissertation examines communicative aspects of Chinese and German business cultures.

== Career ==
For her postgraduate work, Schreiter worked at the University of California, Berkeley the Department of German with Prof Dr. Deniz Göktürk.

Between 2014 and 2017, Schreiter was a lecturer for contextual studies at the University of St. Gallen.

Since 2016, Schreiter has held the position of Managing Director at Guidance, Skills & Opportunities for Researchers e.V. (GSO). Schreiter and her team are dedicated to providing support and guidance to researchers as they navigate their career paths in Germany, regardless of whether their aspirations lead them to a university, research institution, enterprise, or nonprofit organization.

Schreiter regularly engages in and arranges discussions, workshops and events about topics such as academia, science work and science communication.

Since 2019, Schreiter has been a member of the Advisory Board of Elephant in the Lab, a blog about those problems in science, e.g., the journal system, the idiocy of authorship, citation cartels, and career chances for young or female researchers, and a member of the Planck-Academy Sounding Board.

Furthermore, Schreiter is a board member of the „Research Management Network" („Netzwerk Wissenschaftsmanagement") and a mentor for students in multiple programs.

== Awards and honours ==
- Finalist 2020 | Science & Innovation Management at the Falling Walls
- China Scholarship by Alfried Krupp von Bohlen und Halbach Foundation
- Fellow Academic Mentoring Programme of German-speaking Switzerland by the Fellow Academic Mentoring Programme of German-speaking Switzerland, Issued by the Swiss National Science Foundation (SNF)
- Full Study Grant, Issued by Studienstiftung des deutschen Volkes (German National Academic Foundation)
- Study Grant China, Issued by German Academic Exchange Service (DAAD)

== Selected publications ==
- Schreiter, Anne (2012): Kultur zwischen Ökonomisierung und kreativer Unordnung. Eine designtheoretische Perspektive. Interculture Journal.
- Schreiter, Anne (2015): Deutsch-Chinesische Arbeitswelten : Einblicke in den interkulturellen Unternehmensalltag in Deutschland und China. Book.
- Partschefeld, Yves B.; Schreiter, Anne (2015): BRIC on BRIC: Russia - China. Book section.
- Schreiter, Anne (2015): China. Book section.
- Schreiter, Anne (2015): Transcultural Studies in a Chinese Context. Book section.
- Schreiter, Anne; Sternberg, René (2015): Gegangen, um zu bleiben. Lebenswelten junger Erwachsener im ländlichen Ostdeutschland. Book section.
- Schreiter, Anne (2012): Bin ich ostdeutsch? Vom Umgang mit den kleinen Unterschieden. Book section.
