= Lumen Naturae =

2020 book by Matilde Marcolli

Lumen Naturae: Visions of the Abstract in Art and Mathematics is a book on connections between contemporary art, on the one hand, and mathematics and theoretical physics, on the other. It is written by Matilde Marcolli, and published by the MIT Press in 2020.

== Background ==
The author, Matilde Marcolli, is an Italian mathematical physicist who describes herself as having grown up "among art critics and art historians." The book had its origin in public lectures given by Marcolli, at a bookshop near the California Institute of Technology, where she works as a professor. It aims "to explain modern science to the artists and to enlighten the art for scientists".

== Contents ==
Lumen Naturae overviews many recent developments in mathematics, physics, and art, finding in many cases "fluid analogies" rather than more direct correspondences. Reproductions of nearly 250 artworks are included, together with the author's interpretation of these works and their connections to the scientific topics she discusses. The book's focus is on these works themselves, and not on the lives of the artists who created them.

After an introductory chapter, Lumen Naturae is organized into ten topic-specific chapters:

- The first chapter is primarily focused on art, and concerns the frozen moments and juxtapositions of still life and vanitas painting, from its pre-contemporary origins through Paul Cézanne, Dada, and Cubism. It compares these to mathematical models of spacetime.
- The next chapter shifts its focus to mathematics, including number systems, vector spaces, coordinate geometry, and topology, fractals, tessellations, and the Erlangen program of understanding geometries through their symmetries.
- Two more chapters concern entropy, randomness, and complexity, connecting them to the art theory of Rudolf Arnheim and the action painting of Jackson Pollock.
- The sixth chapter concerns zero, the vacuum, and artistic representations of the void. In both general relativity and quantum physics the vacuum is not actually empty, and Marcolli uses this idea to discuss quantum theory and quantum gravity more generally. Works such as Kazimir Malevich's Black Square and Mark Rothko's color fields are selected as the artistic counterpart to these ideas.
- The next three chapters are shorter and more technical, concerning the geometry of numbers and analytic number theory, the Standard Model of particle physics, and the shape of the universe.
- The penultimate chapter concerns futurism in art, and its connections with anarchist, fascist, socialist, and communist politics of the 20th century.
- The final chapter discusses the history of illuminated manuscripts, the use of illustration in mathematics and physics books, and the author's own work illuminating her research notebook pages.

== Audience and reception ==
Stephan Ramon Garcia describes Lumen Naturae as difficult to categorize: "too mathematical to be an art book or a popular-science book" but going "too deeply into art, particularly modern and contemporary art, to be a mathematical book". Its intended audience is "scientifically minded people", and it includes technical material about advanced geometry, probability theory, quantum theory, relativity theory, and the like. Readers are encouraged to read what they can, and skip the rest; reviewer Victor Pambuccian writes that it is "likely to have something very unexpected to say to any reader, regardless of expertise", and Garcia calls it "ideal for someone with a basic knowledge of art, art history, physics, philosophy, and/or mathematics".

Reviewer Paul Campbell praises Lumen Naturae as "extraordinary, fascinating, and astonishing", particularly calling out the wide breadth of topics that it covers, and the many references to art and art theory that it provides for greater depth of coverage of its topics. Pambuccian calls it "the most comprehensive study of the relations between the visual arts and mathematics ever written".

Lumen Naturae won the 2021 PROSE Award for Mathematics.

== Related reading ==
Lumen Naturae is not the only book highlighting the connections between mathematics and art. Reviewer Paul McRae suggests as additional examples The Fourth Dimension and Non-Euclidean Geometry in Modern Art by Linda Dalrymple Henderson (1983), and Mathematics + Art: A Cultural History by Lynn Gamwell (2016).
