= Esther Lutgens =

Dutch physician, molecular biologist and professor

- Born: The Netherlands
- Education: Maastricht University
- Scientific career
- Workplaces: Geisel School of Medicine; Harvard Medical School; Maastricht University
- Thesis: Cell turnover and immune cell activation: key factors in the control of plaque progression and phenotype in atherosclerosis? (2001)

Esther Lutgens is a Dutch physician and molecular biologist who is Professor of Vascular Immunopathology at Amsterdam University Medical Centre. She studies the modulation of co-stimulatory pathways and the immune system.

== Early life and education ==
Lutgens was a medical student at Maastricht University, where she became interested in the cardiovascular and immune systems. She remained there for doctoral research, where she investigated immune cell activation and cell turnover. She then moved to the Department of Pathology as a postdoctoral fellow. She worked alongside Mat Daemen and studied cellular proliferation in atherosclerotic plaque. She moved to the United States, and completed fellowships at Harvard Medical School and the Geisel School of Medicine. At the Harvard Medical School she worked with Peter Libby.

== Research and career ==
Lutgens started her independent scientific career back in the Netherlands, as a Professor at Maastricht University. She was awarded a Sofia Kovalevskaya Award in 2008 and moved to LMU Munich. In 2011, she was appointed a Professor at the University of Amsterdam Medical Centre.

Lutgens' research considers the immune system and vascular inflammation. Her laboratory investigates atherosclerosis, and, in particular, the signalling axis between the protein CD40 and its ligand, CD40L. Lutgens identified that the CD40 ligand was expressed in atherosclerotic plaque (atheroma). Working with Biogen, Lutgens performed murine studies of these observations. She found mice that were CD40L deficient had reduced atherosclerosis.

Lutgens focussed on the signalling pathways of CD40. She found that interactions between TRAF6 and CD40L were key drivers of atherosclerosis. She has developed lipid lowering compounds that can target the TRAF6 binding pocket for CD40.

== Awards and honours ==
- 2013 Netherlands Organisation for Scientific Research Vici Grant
- 2016 ATVB Council Jeffrey M. Hoeg Award
- 2016 European Research Council Consolidator Grant
- 2018 European Society of Cardiology Outstanding Achievement Award
- 2020 American Heart Association Arteriosclerosis Recognition Award

== Selected publications ==
- P Carmeliet; Maria Grazia Lampugnani; Lieve Moons; et al. (1 July 1999). "Targeted deficiency or cytosolic truncation of the VE-cadherin gene in mice impairs VEGF-mediated endothelial survival and angiogenesis". Cell. 98 (2): 147–157. doi:10.1016/s0092-8674(00)81010-7. ISSN 0092-8674. PMID 10428027. Wikidata Q28140788.
- Lutgens E; Gorelik L; Daemen MJ; de Muinck ED; Grewal IS; Koteliansky VE; Flavell RA (1 November 1999). "Requirement for CD154 in the progression of atherosclerosis". Nature medicine. 5 (11): 1313–1316. doi:10.1038/15271. ISSN 1078-8956. PMID 10546000. Wikidata Q52536870.
- C. R. Dhore; J. P. Cleutjens; E. Lutgens; et al. (1 December 2001). "Differential expression of bone matrix regulatory proteins in human atherosclerotic plaques". Arteriosclerosis, Thrombosis, and Vascular Biology. 21 (12): 1998–2003. doi:10.1161/hq1201.100229. ISSN 1079-5642. PMID 11742876. Wikidata Q77350558.
