= Monique Breteler =

Dutch neuroepidemiologist

Monique M. B. Breteler
- Born: 1961; Nijmegen, Netherlands
- Awards: Bengt Winblad Lifetime Achievement Award
- Scientific career
- Fields: Epidemiology, Alzheimer's disease
- Workplaces: Erasmus Universiteit Rotterdam, University of Bonn

Monique Maria Bernadette Breteler (born 26 January 1961, Nijmegen) is a Dutch neuroepidemiologist. She is Director of Population Health Sciences at the German Center for Neurodegenerative Diseases (DZNE) and Professor of Population Health Sciences at the University of Bonn. Between 2002 and 2022, she was Adjunct Professor of Epidemiology at the Harvard School of Public Health in Boston, Massachusetts. She has been a foreign member of the Royal Netherlands Academy of Arts and Sciences since 2015, and a member of the German Academy of Sciences Leopoldina since 2019.

== Academic career ==
Breteler received her medical degree from the University of Nijmegen (1987) and her PhD degree in epidemiology from the Erasmus University Rotterdam (1993).

She joined the Department of Epidemiology at Erasmus University Rotterdam in 1989 to develop the neurologic component in the Rotterdam Study, a large cohort study on chronic diseases in the elderly. From 1995 to 2011 she was head of the neuroepidemiology section of the department, where she was the primary investigator for neurological diseases of the Rotterdam Study and initiated the Rotterdam Scan Study. Her work in the Rotterdam Scan Study led to important insights about Alzheimer's disease, in particular the role of lifestyle factors, metabolic disorders, inflammation, and vascular mechanisms.

Since 2011 she is Director of Population Health Sciences at the German Center for Neurodegenerative Diseases (DZNE) and Professor of Population Health Sciences at the University of Bonn. Between 2002 and 2022, she also held an appointment in the Department of Epidemiology of the Harvard School of Public Health, Boston, MA, as adjunct professor of epidemiology.

== Research ==
Breteler's research interest is in the etiology and preclinical detection of age-related neurodegenerative and cerebrovascular disorders, including dementia (in particular Alzheimer's disease), Parkinson's disease and stroke.

For more than 20 years, Breteler worked on the Rotterdam Study, a prospective population-based study of frequency and causes of age-related disorders that includes 15,000 persons and has been ongoing since 1990, she also initiated the Rotterdam Scan Study, a prospective population-based neuroimaging study that includes more than 5000 people. With her research in the Rotterdam study, Breteler identified a link between life-style factors, vascular and brain diseases, and has been highly successful at identifying links between epidemiological data and brain scan information.

At the German Center for Neurodegenerative Diseases, Breteler is establishing the Rhineland Study, a prospective cohort study of 30,000 individuals that aims to identify causes and preclinical multimodal biomarker profiles of neurodegenerative and neuropsychiatric diseases and to investigate normal and pathological brain structure and function over the adult life course.

== Honours and awards ==
In 1998 Breteler received a fellowship of the Royal Netherlands Academy of Arts and Sciences for her work on vascular factors in Alzheimer's disease, and in 2003 a prestigious VICI grant of the Netherlands Organisation for Scientific Research for her prospective population-based neuro-imaging studies.

In July 2012 Breteler received the "2012 Bengt Winblad Lifetime Achievement Award", which is presented annually by the US-American Alzheimer's Association at the "Alzheimer’s Association International Conference" to honor researchers who have made extraordinary contributions to Alzheimer's disease research.

In 2012 Breteler spoke at the Falling Walls conference in Berlin, according to the official Falling Walls organization to "focus attention on a new age of health research aimed at optimizing brain function and quality of life throughout the entire life span".

She has also taken up various roles to advice on public health policy, e.g. as speaker at the 2014 "The future of Europe is science" conference organized by the European Commission and opened by José Manuel Barroso.

In 2015 Breteler became a foreign member of the Royal Netherlands Academy of Arts and Sciences. In 2019 she became a member of the German Academy of Sciences Leopoldina.
