= Thierry Zomahoun =

Beninese-Canadian political economist

Thierry Zomahoun is a Beninese-Canadian national. Zomahoun is a political economist known for his involvement on educational initiatives, particularly in mathematics.

He is also the chairman and CEO of The Niagara Forum, an international platform in Canada focused on geopolitics, science, and innovation.

Zomahoun is the chairman and CEO of SPG Inc., a high-tech firm based in Toronto. In 2013, Zomahoun founded the Next Einstein Forum (NEF) to promote science and innovation in Africa. The inaugural NEF event held in Senegal in 2016, and a second edition took place in Rwanda in 2018. He established The Kifra Prize in 2019 to honor research excellence.

From 2011 to early 2020, Zomahoun served as the first president and CEO of African Institute for Mathematical Sciences (AIMS). expanding it into a network of centers across Africa. In 2019, he was recognized by The New African Magazine as one of the top 100 Most Influential Africans.

== Innovative education advocacy ==
During his leadership at AIMS, he focused on developing and expanding a network of campuses for graduate scholarship and research in Mathematical Sciences. Saved from the streets by his grandmother, he learned the value of education at a young age and achieved graduate degrees from universities in Africa, Europe, and North America. Since 2011, his work has been focused on creating an enabling environment for the transformation of Africa through education.

Fluent in French and English, Zomahoun is a public advocate for altering perceptions about the potential of African youth and changing attitudes about Africa's role as a global hub for science. He told Jeffrey Marlow from Wired (website) at Falling Walls 2014 in Berlin that AIMS graduates are prepared to challenge the status quo. Through formal master's degree programs, applied research, and science school teacher training programs, the academic institutes produce scholars versed in critical thinking, independent reasoning, and problem-solving. His objective is to form a generation of young scientists and leaders to develop the continent using innovation and change the image of Africa to a continent where science is embraced.

During a meeting with parliamentarians in Ottawa, Canada, in October 2014, Zomahoun told Carl Bernier in a Radio Canada interview, "With a new generation of young scientists, we want to transform the image of Africa." What is different about Zomahoun's approach is that his researchers' topics are directly aligned with developmental issues. "We are creating young leaders in health sciences, technology, finance, and other disciplines from the investment of partners like the Canadian government," he said. "Investment from them has been key to the success of our centres in South Africa, Ghana, Senegal, Cameroon, and Tanzania."

Zomahoun underlines the importance of arming graduates with employment skills as well. "Our plan is to close the skills gap in Africa, we want to train our scholars to take leadership roles in health sciences, planning, technology, telecommunications and banking," he told Anasthasie Tudieshe of Radio France International. Zomahoun believes this is important for youth career advancement and promotes employability.

With encouraging more youth to pursue science, Zomahoun told Luca Tancredi Barone from EuroScientist (Euroscience) in 2015 that, “With 80% of African scholars pursuing humanities, his plan is to accelerate training for scientists in mathematics.” He believes that mathematical sciences provide the most significant benefit for Africa because the investment in infrastructure remains low. Zomahoun also noted that African projects such as the M-Pesa in Kenya and the Square Kilometre Array in South Africa and the continent will need more scientists like the ones trained at AIMS to ensure the programs succeed.

He also advocates that young women pursue mathematical sciences. Zomahoun asserts, “Women and youth must participate in change and development in Africa.” “The next Einstein will be African, and her education in science will be the basis for the continent's development,” he said when interviewed by Aliou Kande of Le Monde.

== Career, industry, and initiatives ==
In 2013, Zomahoun founded the Next Einstein Forum (NEF) - a global forum for science and technology, the first to take place on African soil, to make Africa an international centre for science discourse. The first NEF Global Gathering 2016 was held in Dakar, Senegal, in 2016 under the patronage of H.E. Macky Sall, President of Senegal.

Zomahoun joined AIMS in 2011. His academic team recruited the brightest post-graduate mathematics and science students in Africa. It allowed them to study with professors from international universities in a 24-hour, tuition-free environment. The model proved effective in South Africa, and when Zomahoun joined, his mission was to replicate it across the continent. The expansion plan came to be known as the Next Einstein Initiative. Zomahoun's focus is to ensure the institutes offer research and training opportunities that meet the highest international standards. “We must create the right environment for African scientists to thrive and remain at home to do their research and innovate,” Zomahoun told Philippa Thomas on BBC Four's The World Tonight in 2014.

Zomahoun was invited to join the delegation of Canada's Prime Minister Stephen Harper to the Summit of the Organization of La Francophonie in Dakar, Senegal in 2014. He told Senegal's Le Soleil, “With our partners, such as the Canadian Government, we ensure that they invest in science, research and mathematics to transform Africa through a socio-economic and technological development plan.”

In June 2015, Zomahoun secured a $25 million (USD) investment from the MasterCard Foundation. This investment enabled 500 scholarship students to pursue master's degrees in mathematical sciences and developed a mathematics teacher training program. The donation was announced in Cape Town on June 4, 2015.

Previously, Zomahoun has worked for Right to Play International, Aide et Action International, and ChildFund International. Zomahoun believes that science must focus on impact and be beneficial to society. On a World Economic Forum 2015 panel, Zomahoun debated that sciences and mathematics can be harnessed to offer relevant solutions for global problems. AIMS has a student body encompassing 42 African nationalities and attracts 150 to 200 instructors from 35 countries around the globe each year.
