= Cinzia Casiraghi =

Italian nano-engineer working in Britain

- Education: Politecnico di Milano (BSc); University of Cambridge (PhD)
- Awards: Philip Leverhulme Prize
- Scientific career
- Fields: Graphene; 2D materials Printable electronics Optical spectroscopy Nanotechnology
- Workplaces: University of Manchester; National Graphene Institute
- Thesis: Surface properties and Raman spectroscopy of diamond-like carbon (2006)
- Website: casiraghi.weebly.com

Cinzia Casiraghi is a professor of nanoscience in the Department of Chemistry at the University of Manchester and National Graphene Institute in the UK.

== Education ==
Casiraghi's undergraduate studies took place at the Politecnico di Milano in Italy, where she obtained a BSc and an MSc in Nuclear Engineering. She completed her PhD in electrical engineering at the University of Cambridge in 2006.

== Research and career ==
After her PhD, she completed postdoctoral positions both at Cambridge and at the Free University of Berlin, Germany. In 2008 Casiraghi was awarded the Sofja Kovalevskaya Award, a €1.65 million grant awarded to the highest quality junior researchers from outside Germany, for work concerning formation of graphene and carbon nanotubes. She moved to the University of Manchester in 2010, and was appointed Professor in Nanoscience in 2016, the same year that she was awarded a Philip Leverhulme Prize. She uses Raman spectroscopy to study two-dimensional materials; which include graphene and chalcogenides. She has focussed on ink-jet printed two-dimensional materials as well as nanotubes for sensors, photodetectors and solar cells.

Casiraghi was awarded a European Research Council (ERC) consolidator grant to study the Nucleation of Organic Crystals on 2D Templates. She has also demonstrated diamond-like carbon can be to increase storage density of data storage.

Outside of academia, Casiraghi has contributed to popular science segments for BBC Radio 4 and The Guardian.

== Honours and awards ==
Her awards and honours include:

- Philip Leverhulme Prize, 2016
- Eli and Harari £50K Graphene Enterprise Award, 2015
