= Semiconductor saturable-absorber mirror =

Type of saturable absorber

Semiconductor saturable-absorber mirrors (SESAMs) are a type of saturable absorber used in mode locking lasers.

Semiconductor saturable absorbers were used for laser mode-locking as early as 1974 when p-type germanium was used to mode lock a CO_{2} laser which generated pulses of around 500 picoseconds. Modern SESAMs are III-V semiconductor single quantum well (SQW) or multiple quantum wells grown on semiconductor distributed Bragg reflectors (DBRs). They were initially used in a Resonant Pulse Modelocking (RPM) scheme as starting mechanisms for Ti:Sapphire lasers which employed KLM as a fast saturable absorber. RPM is another coupled-cavity mode-locking technique. Different from APM lasers which employ non-resonant Kerr-type phase nonlinearity for pulse shortening, RPM employs the amplitude nonlinearity provided by the resonant band filling effects of semiconductors. SESAMs were soon developed into intracavity saturable absorber devices because of more inherent simplicity with this structure. Since then, the use of SESAMs has enabled the pulse durations, average powers, pulse energies and repetition rates of ultra-fast solid-state lasers to be improved by several orders of magnitude. Average power of 60W and repetition rate up to 160 GHz were obtained. By using SESAM-assisted KLM, sub-six-femtosecond pulses directly from a Ti: Sapphire oscillator were achieved.

Ursula Keller invented and demonstrated the semiconductor saturable absorber mirror (SESAM) which demonstrated the first passively mode-locked diode-pumped solid-state laser in 1992. "For almost two decades since then, her group at ETH Zurich has continued to define and push the frontier in ultrafast solid-state lasers both with detailed theoretical models and with world-leading experimental results, demonstrating orders of magnitude improvement in key features such as pulse duration, energy, and repetition rate. She also helped to spearhead industrial transfer of this technology. Today most ultrashort lasers are based on SESAM modelocking, with important industrial applications ranging from optical communication, precision measurements, microscopy, ophthalmology, and micromachining."

A major advantage SESAMs have over other saturable absorber techniques is that absorber parameters can be easily controlled over a wide range of values. For example, saturation fluence can be controlled by varying the reflectivity of the top reflector while modulation depth and recovery time can be tailored by changing the low temperature growing conditions for the absorber layers. This freedom of design has further extended the application of SESAMs into modelocking of fiber lasers where a relatively high modulation depth is needed to ensure self-starting and operation stability. Fiber lasers working at 1 μm and 1.5 μm were successfully demonstrated.
