= Isabel Bäurle =

German plant biologist

- Education: University of Freiburg
- Scientific career
- Workplaces: Max Planck Institute of Molecular Plant Physiology; John Innes Centre; University of Potsdam
- Thesis: Positioning the stem cell niche in the shoot apical meristem of Arabidopsis thaliana (2004)
- Website: baurlelab.wordpress.com

Isabel Bäurle is a German plant biologist who is a professor of Plant Epigenetics at the University of Potsdam. She is on the editorial board of the Current Opinion in Plant Biology.

== Early life and education ==
Bäurle was an undergraduate student at the University of Freiburg, where she studied biology and chemistry. She completed an undergraduate research internship at the University of Bologna. In 2000, Bäurle completed her doctoral research at the University of Freiburg. After graduating, she moved to the John Innes Centre, where she worked with Caroline Dean. Bäurle was awarded a Royal Society University Research Fellowship, which allowed her to start her independent scientific career at the John Innes Centre. She worked as a visiting researcher at the Max Planck Institute of Molecular Plant Physiology.

== Research and career ==
Bäurle was appointed a group leader at the University of Potsdam in 2010. She was made a Junior Professor in 2013 and full Professor in 2019.

Bäurle studies the adaptation of plants to abiotic stress, and the roles of epigenetics in the adaptation processes. Abiotic stress, which include extreme temperatures and restricted water, are likely to be exacerbated during the climate crisis. She has shown that plants remember their previous exposure to abiotic stresses, and that whilst their future responses are modified, the fundamental mechanisms that underpin these responses are not understood. Cellular memory in plants is surprising given that they do not have a nervous system. The outputs of Bäurle's research are being used to design new strategies for crop management.

Bäurle serves on the editorial board of the Current Opinion in Plant Biology.

== Selected publications ==
- Bäurle, Isabel; Dean, Caroline (2006). "The timing of developmental transitions in plants". Cell. 125 (4): 655–664. doi:10.1016/j.cell.2006.05.005. PMID 16713560. Wikidata Q36483601.
- Thorsten Hamann; Benková, Eva; Bäurle, Isabel; Kientz, Marika; Jürgens, Gerd (2002). "The Arabidopsis BODENLOS gene encodes an auxin response protein inhibiting MONOPTEROS-mediated embryo patterning". Genes & Development. 16 (13): 1610–1615. doi:10.1101/gad.229402. PMC 186366. PMID 12101120. Wikidata Q33337383.
