= Matilde Marcolli =

Italian mathematician and physicist

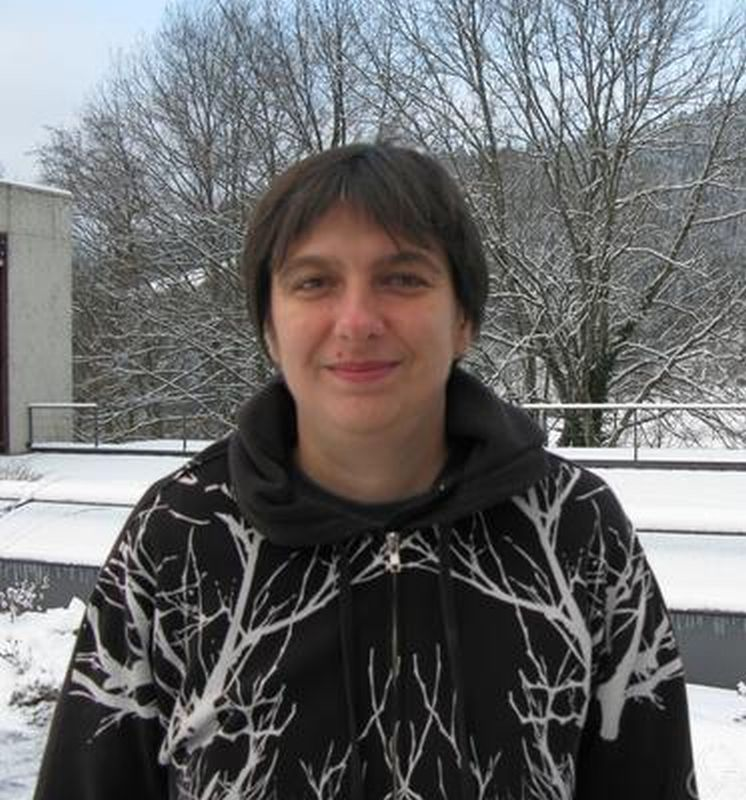
- Marcolli in 2010 at Oberwolfach
- Born: November 30, 1969 (age 56); Como
- Education: University of Milan, University of Chicago
- Scientific career
- Fields: Mathematics
- Workplaces: University of Bonn, Florida State University, Max Planck Institute for Mathematics, Caltech, University of Toronto, Perimeter Institute
- Doctoral advisor: Melvin Rothenberg

Matilde Marcolli is an Italian-American mathematical physicist. She won the Heinz Maier-Leibnitz-Preis of the Deutsche Forschungsgemeinschaft and the Sofia Kovalevskaya Award of the Alexander von Humboldt Foundation, and has authored and edited numerous books. She is currently the Robert F. Christy Professor of Mathematics and Computing and Mathematical Sciences at the California Institute of Technology.

== Career ==
Marcolli obtained her Laurea in Physics in 1993 summa cum laude from the University of Milan under the supervision of Renzo Piccinini, with a thesis on Classes of self equivalences of fibre bundles. She moved to the USA in 1994, where she obtained a master's degree (1994) and a PhD (1997) in Mathematics from the University of Chicago, under the supervision of Melvin Rothenberg, with a thesis on Three dimensional aspects of Seiberg-Witten Gauge Theory. Between 1997 and 2000 she worked at the Massachusetts Institute of Technology (MIT) as a C.L.E. Moore instructor in the Department of Mathematics.

Between 2000 and 2010 she held a C3 position (German equivalent of associate professor) at the Max Planck Institute for Mathematics in Bonn and held an associate professor position (courtesy) at Florida State University in Tallahassee. She also held an honorary professorship at the University of Bonn. From 2008 to 2017 she was a full professor of Mathematics in the Division of Physics, Mathematics and Astronomy of the California Institute of Technology. From 2018 to 2020 she was a professor in the mathematics department of the University of Toronto and a member of the Perimeter Institute. She is currently the Robert F. Christy Professor of Mathematics and Computing and Mathematical Sciences at the California Institute of Technology.

She held visiting positions at the Tata Institute of Fundamental Research in Mumbai, the Kavli Institute for Theoretical Physics in Santa Barbara, the Mittag-Leffler Institute in Stockholm, the Isaac Newton Institute in Cambridge, and the Mathematical Sciences Research Institute in Berkeley, California.

== Research ==
Marcolli's research work has covered different areas of mathematics and theoretical physics: gauge theory and low-dimensional topology, algebraic-geometric structures in quantum field theory, noncommutative geometry with applications to number theory and to physics models, especially related to particle physics, quantum gravity and cosmology, and to the quantum Hall effect. She also worked in linguistics.

She has collaborated with several other mathematicians, physicists, and linguists, among them Yuri I. Manin, Alain Connes, Michael Atiyah, Roger Penrose, Noam Chomsky. Twenty six graduate students obtained their PhD under her supervision between 2006 and 2022.

She also wrote articles about philosophy, theory about art and anarchism. She also wrote about anarcho-transhumanism.

== Honors and awards ==
In 2001 she obtained the Heinz Maier-Leibnitz-Preis of the Deutsche Forschungsgemeinschaft (DFG) and in 2002 the Sofia Kovalevskaya Award of the Alexander von Humboldt Foundation. She was a plenary speaker in the 2008 European Congress of Mathematics in Amsterdam (with a talk on Renormalization, Galois symmetries and motives) and an invited speaker of the 2010 International Congress of Mathematicians in Hyderabad (with a talk on Noncommutative Geometry and Arithmetic).

== Books authored ==
- Marcolli, Matilde (1999). Seiberg-Witten gauge theory. New Delhi: Hindustan Book Agency. ISBN 978-81-85931-22-7. OCLC 468606720.
- Marcolli, Matilde; Manin, Jurij Ivanovič (2005). Arithmetic Noncommutative Geometry. American Mathematical Society. ISBN 978-0-8218-3833-4.
- Connes, Alain; Marcolli, Matilde (2008). Noncommutative Geometry, Quantum Fields and Motives. American Mathematical Society. ISBN 978-0-8218-7478-3.
- Marcolli, Matilde (2010). Feynman Motives. Singapore: World Scientific. ISBN 978-981-4271-20-2.
- Matilde, Marcolli (2017). Noncommutative Cosmology. Singapore: World Scientific. ISBN 978-981-320-286-3.
- Marcolli, Matilde (2020). Lumen Naturae: Visions of the Abstract in Art and Mathematics. MIT Press. ISBN 978-0-262-04390-8.
- Matilde, Marcolli; Chomsky, Noam; Berwick, Robert A. (2025). Mathematical Structure of Syntactic Merge: An Algebraic Model for Generative Linguistics. The MIT Press. ISBN 978-0-262-55252-3.

== Books edited ==
- Hertling, Claus; Marcolli, Matilde, eds. (2003). Frobenius Manifolds: Quantum Cohomology and Singularities. Vieweg-Teubner Verlag. ISBN 978-3-322-80238-5.
- Consani, Caterina; Marcolli, Matilde, eds. (2006). Noncommutative geometry and number theory: where arithmetic meets geometry and physics (1st ed.). Vieweg-Teubner Verlag. ISBN 978-3-8348-0170-8.
- Albeverio, Sergio; Marcolli, Matilde; Paycha, Sylvie; Plazas, Jorge (2008). Traces in Number Theory, Geometry and Quantum Fields. Vieweg+Teubner Verlag. ISBN 978-3-8348-0371-9.
- Khalkhali, Masoud; Marcolli, Matilde (2008). An Invitation to Noncommutative Geometry. World Scientific. ISBN 978-981-270-616-4.
- Ceyhan, Özgür; Manin, Yu I.; Marcolli, Matilde (2010). Arithmetic and Geometry Around Quantization. Springer. ISBN 978-0-8176-4831-2.
- Abbaspour, Hossein; Marcolli, Matilde; Tradler, Thomas (2010). Deformation spaces: perspectives on algebro-geometric moduli. Vieweg+Teubner. ISBN 978-3-8348-1271-1.
- Marcolli, Matilde; Parashar, Deepak (2011). Quantum groups and noncommutative spaces perspectives on quantum geometry: a publication of the Max-Planck-Institute for Mathematics, Bonn. Vieweg + Teubner. ISBN 978-3-8348-1442-5. OCLC 793144094.
