= Ursula Keller =

Swiss physicist

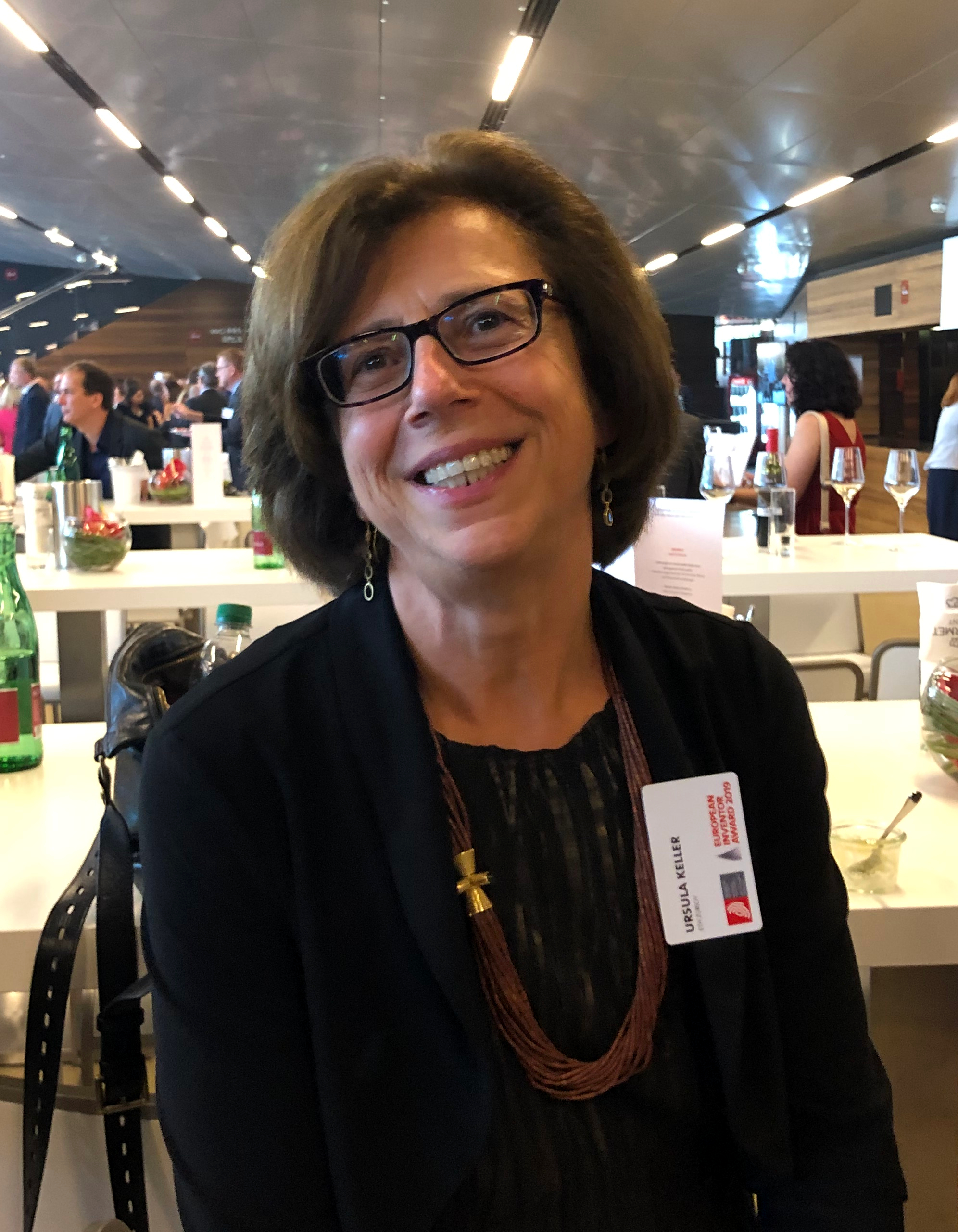
- Born: 21 June 1959 (age 67)
- Known for: Inventing the Semiconductor saturable-absorber mirror technology used in mode locking ultra-fast solid-state laser systems
- Awards: National Academy of Engineering Member, National Academy of Sciences Member
- Scientific career
- Fields: Physics, Laser Technology
- Doctoral students: Clara Saraceno

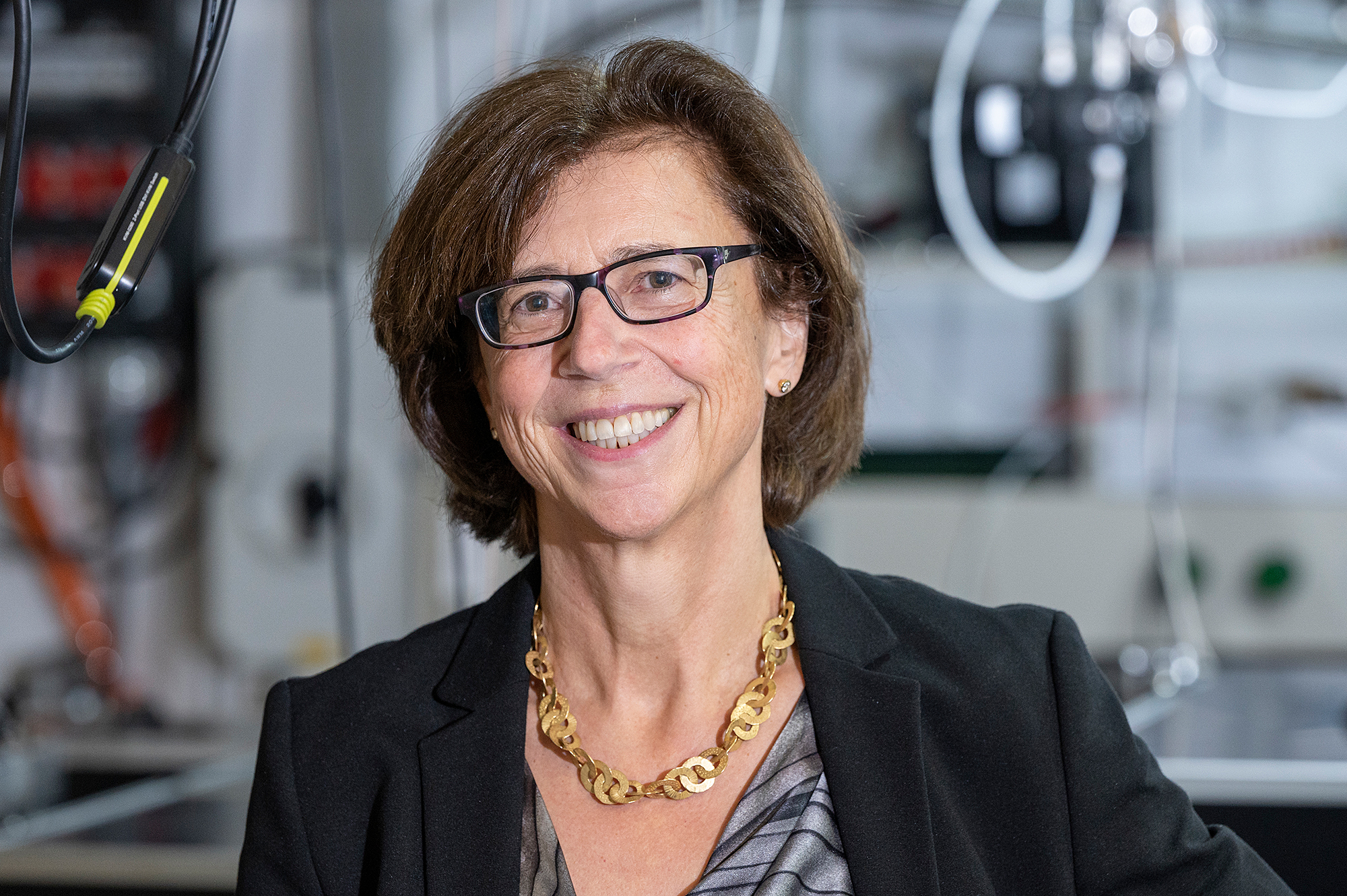
Ursula Keller (2022)

Ursula Keller (born 21 June 1959) is a Swiss physicist. She has been a tenured physics professor at ETH Zurich, Switzerland since 1993. A pioneer in ultrafast science and technology, she is known for inventing the semiconductor saturable absorber mirror (SESAM), enabling passive mode-locking of lasers and revolutionizing ultrafast laser applications in science and industry. Keller led the Swiss NCCR MUST program in ultrafast science (2010–2022), co-founded several companies, including Time-Bandwidth Products (now part of Lumentum) and K2 Photonics, and published a graduate textbook "Ultrafast Laser Physics" with Springer Verlag. She is highly cited and received many prestigious awards. From 2012-2016 she was the founding president of the Women Professors Forum at ETH Zurich.

== Career ==
Ursula Keller grew up in a working-class family. After graduating with a "diploma" degree in physics in 1984 from ETH Zurich, Switzerland, she continued her studies at Stanford University, where she obtained a master's degree in 1987, and then continued with a doctorate in 1989 in applied physics. The topic of her studies was the development of a new technique for optical measurement of charge and voltage in GaAs type integrated circuits.

From 1989 to 1993, she started her independent research as a member of technical staff at AT&T Bell Laboratories in Holmdel, New Jersey, where she conducted research on photonic switching, ultra-fast laser technology and semiconductor spectroscopy and developed a method for manufacturing ultra-short pulse lasers.

In 1993, she was appointed as a tenured associate Professor of Physics at the Swiss Federal Institute of Technology in Zurich, becoming the school's first female Professor of Physics. In October 1997, she became a full professor.

Her research areas are ultra-fast solid-state and semiconductor lasers, the development of reliable and functional instruments to generate extreme ultraviolet (EUV) X-rays and attosecond science. She developed the first method for generating ultra-fast light pulses known as semiconductor saturable-absorber mirrors (SESAMs), which have become a worldwide industry standard for cutting and welding in fields ranging from electronics and automotive industry to communications technology, medical diagnostics and surgery and have made myriad important contributions to the field of laser science since. Dr. Keller’s earlier research into carrier envelope phase stabilization and frequency comb technology was integral to Theodor W. Hänsch and John L. Hall’s development of laser-based spectroscopy that garnered them the 2005 Nobel Prize in Physics.

Ursula Keller has published more than 500 peer-reviewed journal papers with total citation of more than 56000 and h-index of 123. Her first SESAM review publication has cited by 2472 people (as on 28. November 2024).

Ursula Keller has patented several inventions in the field of ultra-fast lasers for industrial and medical applications.

She is the creator of the Attoclock, one of the most accurate time measurement devices in the world, which can record time intervals up to a few attoseconds, the billionth part of a billionth of a second.

From 2010 to 2022, Ursula Keller has been Director of the Swiss National Research Centre for Ultra-fast Molecular Sciences and Technologies (NCCR MUST), funded by the Swiss National Science Foundation.

Since 2014, she has been a member of the Research Council of the Swiss National Science Foundation.

In 2018, Ursula Keller won the European Inventor Award in the "Lifetime Achievement ". In 2019, she was appointed as one of the leading experts that judges proposals for this award.

She won the IEEE Photonics Award in 2018 and the IEEE Edison Medal in 2019.

She won the 2020 Gold Medal from the Society of Photo-Optical Instrumentation Engineers and the 2020 Frederic Ives Medal / Jarus Quinn Prize from the Optical Society.

Ursula Keller engages for equal rights and better career opportunities of women in fields of Science, technology, engineering, and mathematics. She was director of a research programme of the Swiss National Science Foundation from 2010 till 2022, and was the founding president of the ETH Women Professors Forum. In March 2019, in the context of the mobbing allegations against Marcella Carollo, Ursula Keller denounced a "lack of leadership, gender discrimination and corruption at ETH Zurich" and claimed that the reason for the proposed dismissal of her colleague was "not primarily the mobbing allegations, but her gender". In the same period, Ursula Keller has been formally reprimanded by ETH Zurich, including the mention of a possible dismissal in case of recurrence. Two external investigations disproved the accusations that Ursula Keller made against ETH Zurich. Otherwise, the Swiss Federal Audit Office recommended more transparency in the distribution of funds. The Federal Administrative Court of Switzerland ruled in 2022, that the termination was unjustified due to a lack of objectively sufficient grounds.

== Awards and honors ==
- 1998: Zeiss Research Award, "for her pioneering work on the generation of high-power, ultra-short laser pulses using solid-state lasers".
- 2003: Fellow of OSA
- 2004: Berthold Leibinger Innovation Prize from the Berthold Leibinger Stiftung for her Semiconductor Saturable Absorber Mirror (SESAM) invention enabling industrial mode locked solid-state lasers
- 2008: Joseph Fraunhofer Award / Robert M. Burley Prize from The Optical Society "For seminal contributions to the development and application of ultrafast lasers and notably pioneering work on semiconductor saturable absorber mode-locking."
- 2013: Arthur L. Schawlow Award, Laser institute of America (LIA), LIA's highest achievement award
- 2014: Fellow of the Institute of Electrical and Electronics Engineers (IEEE), 2014 for contributions to ultrashort pulse mode locked laser physics and technology
- 2015: Charles Hard Townes Award from The Optical Society "For seminal contributions in the fields of octave-spanning lasers, frequency comb technology, and high repetition-rate ultrafast semiconductor disc lasers."
- 2017: Weizmann Women and Science Award, "In recognition of her pioneering and seminal contributions to ultrafast lasers technology and important breakthroughs in attosecond science"
- 2018: European Inventor Award for laser technology in the category "Lifetime achievement."
- 2018: IEEE Photonics Award,
- 2019: IEEE Edison Medal,
- 2020: SPIE Gold Medal, is the highest honor the Society bestows, "in recognition of career long pioneering contributions in ultrafast science"
- 2020: Frederic Ives Medal/Quinn Prize, which recognises overall distinction in Optics, from The Optical Society "For fundamental contributions to ultrafast lasers technology, especially the development of high peak and average power oscillators and important breakthroughs in attosecond science"
- 2021: Elected as an international member of the National Academy of Sciences, USA
- 2022: Marcel Benoist Prize, which has been dubbed the "Swiss Nobel Prize"
- 2025: Foreign Member of the Royal Society
- 2026: Elected as an international member of the National Academy of Engineering, USA, for "contributions to ultrafast lasers and attosecond technologies"
