= Martin Lodge =

Martin Lodge is professor of political science and public policy at the London School of Economics (LSE). Lodge studies comparative regulatory regimes and policies, institutional analysis, and German, British and European Union public policy. He is considered one of the leading scholars of regulation.

== Selected publications ==
- On different tracks: designing railway regulation in Britain and Germany. Praeger, Westport, CT., 2002. ISBN 9780275976019
- The politics of public service bargains: reward, competency, loyalty - and blame. Oxford University Press, Oxford, 2006. (With Christopher Hood) ISBN 9780199269679
- Executive politics in times of crisis. Palgrave Macmillan, Basingstoke, 2012. (Editor with Kai Wegrich) ISBN 9780230304864
- Political science research methods in action. Palgrave Macmillan, Basingstoke, 2013. (With Michael Bruter) ISBN 9780230367753
