= Xiaoying Zhuang =

Researcher in computational mechanics

Xiaoying Zhuang (born 1983) is a researcher in computational mechanics, including continuum mechanics, peridynamics, and the analysis of vibration and fracture mechanics. She has applied these methods in the design of composite materials and nanostructures, including materials for the aerospace industry and nano-machines for harvesting vibrational energy. Originally from China, and educated in China and England, she has worked in Norway, China, and Germany, where she is Heisenberg Professor and Chair of Computational Science and Simulation Technology of Leibniz University Hannover.

== Education and career ==
Zhuang was born in Shanghai in 1983. She was a student at Tongji University in Shanghai, graduating in 2007, and then traveled to Durham University in England for graduate study. She completed her doctoral dissertation, Meshless methods: theory and application in 3D fracture modelling with level sets, in 2010 in the Durham School of Engineering and Computing Sciences, supervised by Charles Augarde.

She became a postdoctoral researcher at the Norwegian University of Science and Technology, and then from 2011 to 2014 she returned to Tongji University as a lecturer and later associate professor.

She moved to Germany in 2014. After a year at Bauhaus University, Weimar, she became a research group leader within the Institute of Continuum Mechanics at Leibniz University Hannover in Germany in 2015. She became a full professor at the university in 2021; there, she is a Heisenberg Professor and Chair of Computational Science and Simulation Technology in the Institute for Photonics and Faculty of Mathematics and Physics.

== Books ==
Zhuang is a coauthor of books including:

- Extended Finite Element and Meshfree Methods (with Timon Rabczuk, Jeong-Hoon Song, and Cosmin Anitescu, Academic Press, 2020)
- Computational Methods Based on Peridynamics and Nonlocal Operators: Theory and Applications (with Timon Rabczuk and Huilong Ren, Springer, 2023).

== Recognition ==
The Association of Computational Mechanics in Engineering – UK (ACME-UK) gave Zhuang their 2010 Zienkiewicz Prize for the best annual doctoral dissertation in computational mechanics. Zhuang's move to Bauhaus University, Weimar was funded by a Marie Curie International Incoming Fellowship, funded by the European Commission. She was a 2015 recipient of the Sofia Kovalevskaya Award, funding her work as a group leader in the Hannover Institute of Continuum Mechanics.

Zhuang was a 2018 recipient of the Heinz Maier-Leibnitz-Preis, given "for her research into lightweight materials for aviation". The International Chinese Association of Computational Mechanics gave her their Fellow Award in 2018, and she was also a 2018 recipient of the Science Prize of the State of Lower Saxony for Young Scientists. She was a 2019 recipient of the German Curious Mind Researcher Award, in the "materials and active ingredients" category, recognizing her research on the simulation of nano-scale mechanical-energy harvesters "at the intersection of mechanical engineering and materials science". She was named as a Heisenberg Professor in 2020.
