= Vittorio Saraceno =

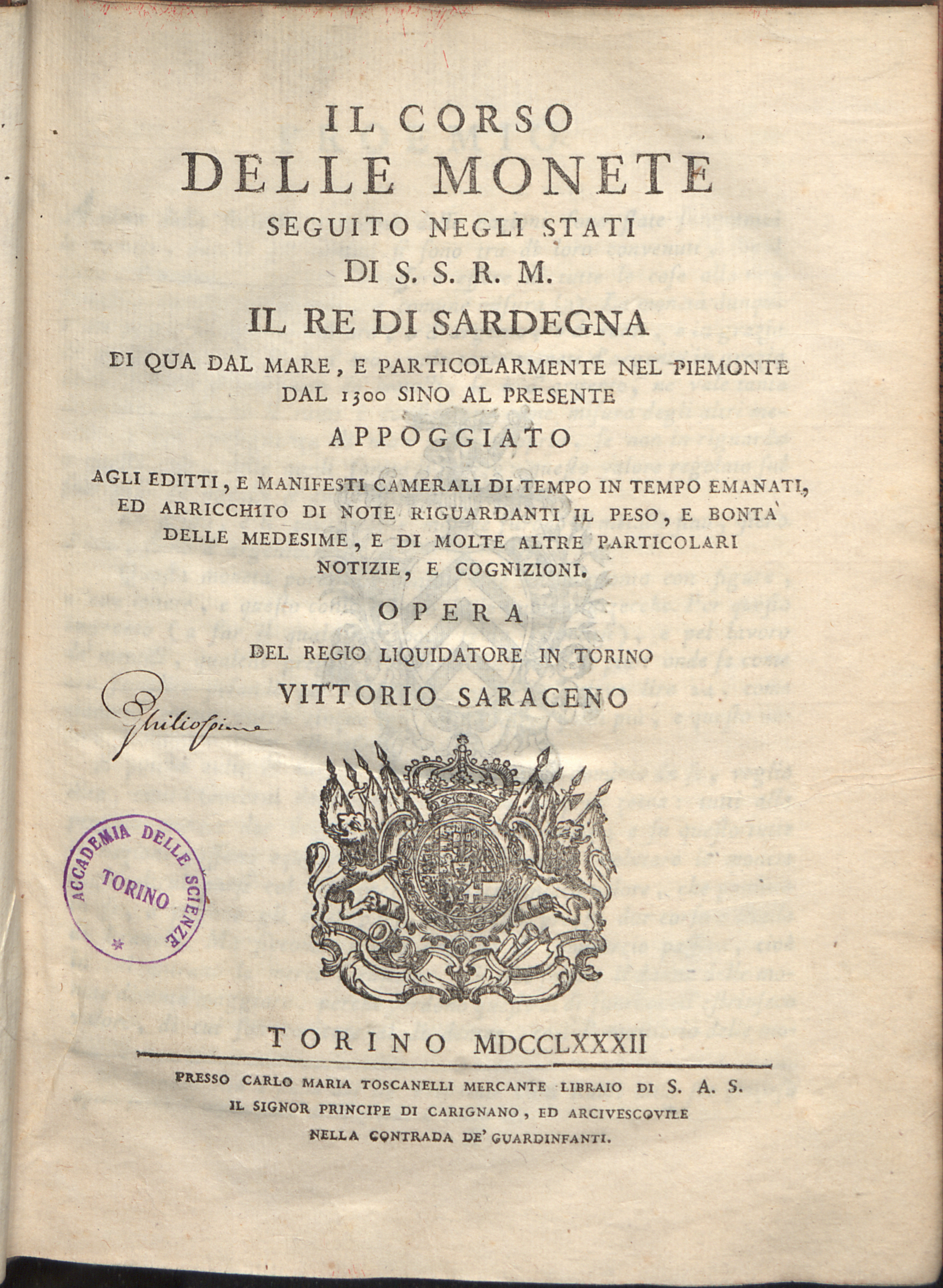
Corso delle monete seguito negli Stati di S.S.R.M. il Re di Sardegna di qua dal mare. 1782 – via BEIC digital library.

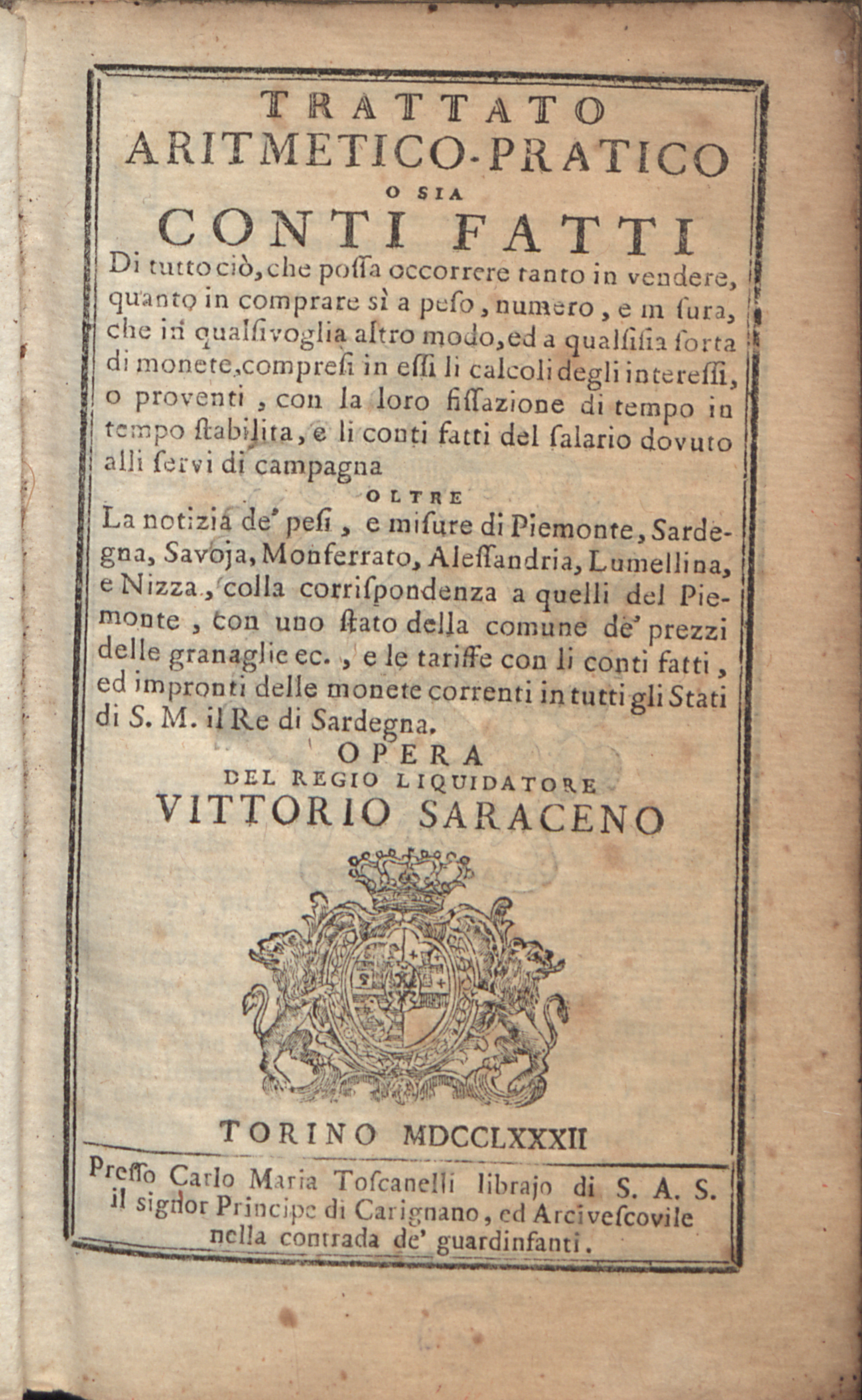
Trattato aritmetico-pratico, 1782

Vittorio Saraceno (18th century) was an Italian economist and numismatist.

== Works ==
- Saraceno, Vittorio (1776). Trattato o sia tariffa di tutte le monete d'oro, e d'argento, secondo il loro valore comunemente corso dalli 15 maggio 1658 sino al presente. Torino: Giovanni Antonio Masserano.
- Saraceno, Vittorio (1782). Corso delle monete seguito negli Stati di S.S.R.M. il Re di Sardegna di qua dal mare. Torino: Carlo Maria Toscanelli, Stamperia reale Torino.
- Saraceno, Vittorio (1782). Trattato aritmetico-pratico. Torino: Carlo Maria Toscanelli, Stamperia reale Torino.
