= Michael Bruter =

French academic

- Occupation: Professor

Academic background
- Education: Institut d'études politiques de Bordeaux; University of Hull; University of Bordeaux; University of Houston
- Thesis: Understanding Identity Realignment: the Emergence of a Mass European Identity (2001)

Academic work
- Discipline: Political Science
- Sub-discipline: Electoral psychology, Electoral ergonomics, Political behaviour, Political psychology, Elections, Public opinion, Research methods, Comparative politics, Political participation, Political communication, Youth politics, Extremism, Protest politics, and European politics.
- Institutions: London School of Economics and Political Science (2001-); University of Hull (1999-2001); University of Houston (1997-1999)
- Website: www.epob.org/michael-a-bruter/

Michael Bruter is Professor of political science and European politics at the London School of Economics, where he directs the Electoral Psychology Observatory in collaboration with Sarah Harrison. He is also incoming Associate Vice President and Pro-Vice Chancellor for Research at the LSE (from October 2024) and a co-founder of CODES Collaborative Democracy Solutions with Sarah Harrison, a venture also supported by the LSE which uses research findings from electoral psychology, electoral ergonomics, technology, and design to create new democratic tools. A discoverer of the sub-fields of electoral psychology and electoral ergonomics, Bruter is also a specialist in political behaviour, political psychology, elections, public opinion, research methods, comparative politics, political participation, political communication, youth politics, extremism, protest politics, and European politics.

Bruter has notably been invited to speak at the Nobel Prize Dialogue on the future of democracy and by the World Economic Forum . He was also the first social scientist invited by the STOA Panel of the European Parliament to give their annual keynote speech on the future of science and technology and his research has been discussed in an event at the United Nations .

== Biography ==
Bruter earned an undergraduate degree from the Bordeaux Institute of Political Studies in 1996, a master's degree in European Studies from the University of Hull in 1997 and a master's degree in European Political and Economic History from the University of Bordeaux in 1998. He obtained his PhD in 2001 from the University of Houston, and lectured at the University of Hull from 1999 to 2001, before joining the London School of Economics and Political Science in 2001. He was promoted to professor in 2014, and has been director-founder of the Electoral Psychology Observatory since February 2020.

He is an associate member of the Centre for the Study of Democratic Citizenship at McGill University in Montreal, as well as Europa Fellow at the Australian National University. He has also held numerous visiting appointments, notably at Columbia University (New York), the University of Melbourne, the Bordeaux and Strasbourg Instituts d'Etudes Politiques, the University of Canterbury, the University of Salzburg, etc.

== Research ==
=== European identity ===
Bruter's doctoral thesis, published in 2001 as "Understanding identity realignments: The emergence of a mass European identity", was partly funded by a grant from the Economic and Social Research Council (ESRC). One of his supervisors was Professor Mark Franklin, a lead expert on electoral and European Union politics.

In 2005, he published "Citizens of Europe?: The Emergence of a Mass European Identity".

This book shows empirically for the first time how a mass European identity has emerged across the EU member states between 1970 and the present day. Beyond this novel approach, it also offers a whole new theory of political identities, based on two 'civic' and 'cultural' components. Michael Bruter shows how multiple identities reinforce - rather than exclude - each other, and studies in depth the unsuspected impact of the media and political institutions on the emergence of new political identities.

— Citizens of Europe?: The Emergence of a Mass European Identity, back cover.

=== Extreme-right in Europe ===
In "Mapping Extreme Right Ideology" (2011), Michael Bruter and Sarah Harrison investigate 25 extreme-right parties in 17 European countries. Their multimethod research (mass survey, leaders interviews, textual analysis) results in a new model of European extreme-right politics, based on expressions of authoritarian values and negative identity.

Throughout this study, we theoretically develop and empirically test a conceptual map of the extreme right ideological world, based on two dimensions: (1) a negative identity dimension that can take two predominant forms of expression, which we respectively define as xenophobic and populist, and (2) an authoritarian dimension, of which the two founding modes are respectively reactionary and repressive. We show that the first dimension concerns the way an extreme right party, leader, or voter tends to identify the simplified source of the problems faced by the nation and that the second concerns the equally simplified universal and utopian solution that they propose to fix it.

— Mapping Extreme Right Ideology, p. 195.

Their research also recognises the diversity of the extreme-right party family.

"What is an extreme right party? How do we define the extreme right party family? Who is a member and who is not? Is it a party family at all? [...] Far from being a monolithic and unified concept, the European extreme right constitutes a varied and complex multidimensional universe, with its tensions, hesitations, transformations, and challenges on how to match the preferences of parties, leaders, members, and potential voters over time."

— Mapping Extreme Right Ideology, p. 1 & 194.

=== Inside the Mind of a Voter: A New Approach to Electoral Psychology – Electoral Psychology and Electoral Ergonomics ===
In 2013, Bruter's ECREP at LSE team won the award for Best International Research from the Market Research Society alongside Opinium Research for Bruter's "Inside the Mind of a Voter" project (which survey fieldwork was completed by Opinium). The €1.2 million project on electoral psychology is funded by the European Research Council. Beyond academic publications, the project has had an important public profile, with a presentation at the Falling Walls conference, an interview in Nature, and multiple references in the media, for example in the Guardian, Le Monde, etc.

In 2020, Bruter and Harrison published "Inside the mind of a voter: a new approach to electoral psychology", offering a new political psychology perspective to electoral politics, by focussing on the point of view and emotions of voters, rather than on electoral institutions.

The authors examine unique concepts including electoral identity, atmosphere, ergonomics, and hostility. From filming the shadow of voters in the polling booth, to panel study surveys, election diaries, and interviews, Bruter and Harrison unveil insights into the conscious and subconscious sides of citizens’ psychology throughout a unique decade for electoral democracy. They highlight how citizens’ personality, memory, and identity affect their vote and experience of elections, when elections generate hope or hopelessness, and how subtle differences in electoral arrangements interact with voters’ psychology to trigger different emotions.

— Inside the mind of a voter: a new approach to electoral psychology, abstract.

This research is not only about studying voters' emotions, but seeks to determine how to improve electoral institutions by better taking into account these emotions. This has led Bruter to collaborate with several Electoral Commissions (Australia, Georgia, Sweden, Palestinian Territories, South Africa, etc.), European Union institutions, and several international or cultural organizations, such as the British Council. As explained by Bruter and Harrison (2017: "Understanding the emotional act of voting"):

To understand voting behaviour, we must consider voters' emotions and their interaction with electoral arrangements and the complex functions elections serve in democracies. We can then optimize voting via electoral ergonomics — the design of electoral arrangements that consider voters' bodies and minds.

— Understanding the emotional act of voting

=== Electoral hostility ===
On 6 April 2018, the European Research Council (ERC) announced that Bruter had been awarded an Advanced Grant of €2.5 million over five years for his new project ELHO dedicated to the study of electoral hostility in 27 democracies. Bruter explained that the project is intended to understand why so many people hate each other because of the way they vote, what are the implications of this hostility and what can be done to resolve it.

I define electoral hostility as negative feelings (frustration, anger, contempt, disgust) held towards individuals or groups as a result of their effective or perceived electoral preferences. It may occur in the campaign, post-election, and reinforce into self-perpetuating cycles of hostility as it is structured as a Mokken scale which can become ‘stages’ of hostility. While scepticism of political elites is well-studied, hostility towards fellow voters takes electoral negativity to a new level. Electoral hostility may have far reaching consequences, leading citizens to resent one another due to electoral stances and drift apart in increasingly divided societies, but also to the delegitimization of electoral outcomes and negative attitudes towards solidarity.

— ELHO: The Age of Hostility, EPO website.

Bruter and his EPO colleagues have developed a Hostility Barometer. For example, during the 2019 UK General Elections, the research team found that "49% of those intending to vote Conservative feel some “contempt” towards Labour voters, and 68% of those intending to vote Labour feel some "disgust" towards Conservative voters".

This "The Age of Hostility" project is one of the two founding projects of the Electoral Psychology Observatory (Department of Government, LSE), alongside the "First and Foremost" project (analysing the experience of first-time voters).

=== First time voters and youth democratic experience ===
In 2011, Bruter received a €250,000 European Commission grant to study youth participation in Europe, having done previous research on young party members' motivations in European democracies. In 2016, he published "Youth participation in Europe: In between hope and disillusion" (with Cammaerts, Banaji, Harrison, and Anstead).

The main argument of the book is that youth may not regularly engage with the standard forms of political participation not because they are apathetic, but rather because the political offer does not match their concerns, ideas and ideals of democratic politics. Diverse groups of young people feel that ‘those in power do not listen’. Youth are therefore critical against mainstream politics and traditional media and feel that they must not merely be given a voice, but also possibilities to participate in follow-up processes and to further shape the relevant debates and policy implementation.

— Book Review: Youth Participation in Democratic Life: Stories of Hope and Disillusion.

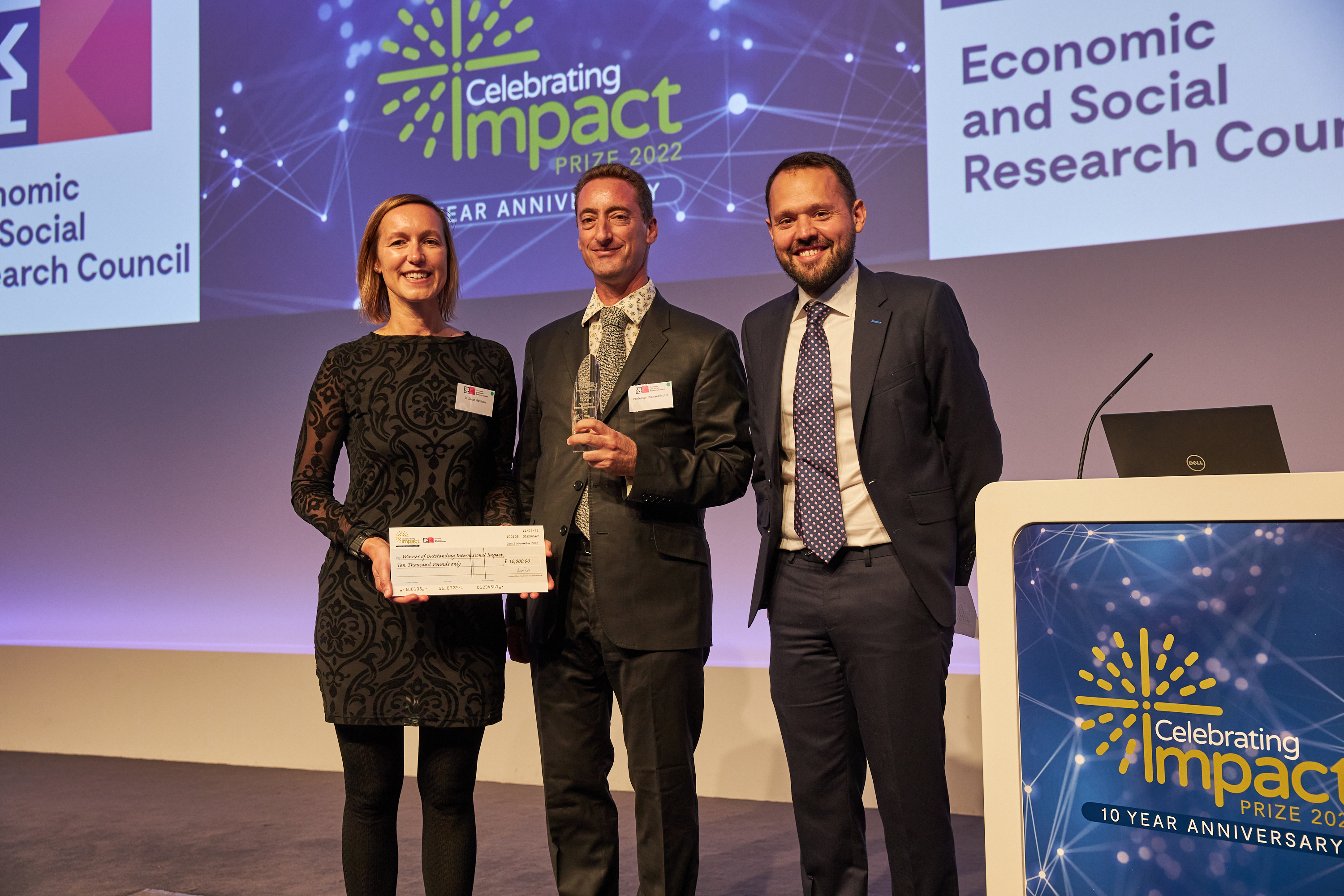
Michael Bruter (center) and Sarah Harrison (left) receiving the ESRC Celebrating Impact Prize, 2022

In 2016, Bruter started a new project on optimising the electoral experience of first time voter in collaboration with Sarah Harrison and a number of leading Electoral Commissions around the world, resulting in the EPO's "First and Foremost" projet, funded by a £720,000 grant from the Economic and Social Research Council. One of the key justification of this research is the fact that youth who abstain in the first two elections of their lives are likely to become chronic abstentionist, while those who vote in their first two elections can be expected to be regiular participants. Therefore, improving first-time voters' experience is key to maintaining a reasonably high electoral turnout.

Bruter spoke in favor of lowering the legal voting age because young people who still live with their parents are more likely to vote, which could lead to a higher turnout among first-time voters, and thus also to higher participation in the long term due to the habituation phenomenon associated with youths' first two votes.

In November 2022, the Economic and Social Research Council (ESRC) announced that Bruter and Harrison had been awarded the Celebrating Impact Prize 2022 for Outstanding international impact due to the EPO's work on optimising citizens’ electoral experience.

=== Empowering citizens with technology ===
Bruter and Sarah Harrison also founded the Collaborative Democracy Solutions (CODES) project, supported by the LSE, which aims to better understand the mind of voters, as well as optimise electoral and consultative processes, using technology. One of the project's key achievement is the Code T human-led artificial intelligence, which allows citizens to express their preferences in their own words and have them translated into "powerful, accurate, and transparent collective decisions".

In 2022, the project received a European Research Council Proof of Concept grant of €150,000.

== Awards ==
- Winner ESRC/UKRI Celebrating Impact Prize for Outstanding International Impact (2022)
- Stein Rokkan award for Best International Research, Honourable mention, for Inside the Mind of a Voter (2021)
- Best International Research Award, Market Research Society for “Inside the Mind of a Voter” (2013)
- Best International Research Award, Special mention, Market Research Society for “Values in international cooperation” (2021)
- Best International Research Award, Finalist, Market Research Society for “Feeling European” (2014)

== Selected publications ==
- Inside the Mind of a Voter. Princeton University Press, 2020. ISBN 9780691182896 (with Sarah Harrison). This book received the Honourable Mention for the Stein Rokkan prize 2021 jointly awarded by the European Consortium for Political Research and the International Science Council for best book in comparative social science.
- Youth Participation in Democratic Life. ISBN 9781403932396 Palgrave Macmillan, 2016. (with Bart Cammaerts, Shaku Banaji, Sarah Harrison, and Nick Anstead)]
- Political science research methods in action. Palgrave Macmillan, Basingstoke, 2013. (With Martin Lodge) ISBN 9780230367753
- Asia in the Eyes of Europe: Images of a Rising Giant. Nomos, 2012. (Co-edited with Sebastian Bersick, Natalia Chaban, Sol Iglesias, and Ronan Lenihan)
- Mapping Extreme Right Ideology. Palgrave Macmillan, 2011 (with Sarah Harrison).
- The Future of our Democracies. Palgrave Macmillan, 2009. (With Sarah Harrison)
- Encyclopaedia of European elections. Palgrave Macmillan, Basington, 2007. ISBN 9781403994844 (With Yves Deloye)
- Citizens of Europe? The emergence of a mass European identity. Palgrave Macmillan, 2005. ISBN 9781403932396
