= Hsiao-Wen Chen =

Chinese-American astronomer

Hsiao-Wen Chen (Chinese: 陳曉雯) is a Taiwanese-American astronomer who uses a combination of absorption spectroscopy and emission-line mapping to study diffuse baryonic "normal matter" in the intergalactic medium and galactic halos, and the connections between this matter and the matter in star-forming regions of galaxies. The circumgalactic medium resides in the interface between star-forming regions and intergalactic space contains the majority of baryonic mass as well as the critical record of gas circulation in and out of galaxies. Chen, a professor of astronomy and astrophysics at the University of Chicago, has been leading efforts to decipher how the growth and evolution of galaxies over cosmic time are connected and/or regulated by the physical properties of the circumgalactic gas.

== Education and career ==
Chen studied physics at National Taiwan University, earning a bachelor's degree in 1992 and a master's in 1994. She completed a Ph.D. in astronomy at Stony Brook University in 1999.

After postdoctoral research at the Carnegie Observatories from 1999 to 2002, and as a Hubble Fellow at the Massachusetts Institute of Technology from 2002 to 2005, Chen became an assistant professor of astronomy at the University of Chicago in 2005. She was promoted to associate professor in 2012 and full professor in 2017. She has also been affiliated with the university's Kavli Institute for Cosmological Physics since 2007.

She was her university's representative to the Association of Universities for Research in Astronomy from 2006 to 2017, chair of the Visiting Committee of the Adler Planetarium 2013-2014, vice-president of the intergalactic medium commission of the International Astronomical Union from 2015 to 2021, chair of the Hubble Space Telescope Users Committee for 2016–2017, and member of the NASA Astrophysics Advisory Committee from 2023 to 2025. She is the principal investigator of two large Hubble Space Telescope General Observer's programs, the Cosmic Ultraviolet Baryon Survey (CUBS) and the Circumgalactic Observations of Nuv-shifted Transitions Across Cosmic Time (CONTACT) project. Chen is serving on the Executive Committee of NASA Cosmic Origins Program Analysis Group. She is a principal organizer of the NASA COPAG DGCE seminar series.

== Recognition ==
The American Astronomical Society named Chen to their 2022 class of AAS Fellows, "for fundamental work using quasar absorption-line observations to study the halo gas content of galaxies".
