= Benedetto Saraceno =

Italian psychiatrist

Benedetto Saraceno (born 1948) is an Italian psychiatrist and an advocate of mental health reforms. He has been director of the Department of Mental Health and Substance Abuse of the World Health Organization and is the Secretary General of the Lisbon Institute for Global Mental Health. He has been appointed as a Global Ambassador of the Special Olympics.

== Biography ==
Saraceno was trained as a psychiatrist in Italy and worked with the team of Franco Basaglia in Trieste. He was an active militant of the movement "Psichiatria Democratica", the Italian professional group supporting the process of deinstitutionalization and the establishment of a national network of community mental health services. In 1981 Saraceno became the director of a public residential facility for severely mental disabled persons in Milan.

In 1985 he moved from clinical work to research at the Institute "Mario Negri" in Milan where he worked mostly in the field of public mental health as director of the Laboratory of Social Psychiatry and Epidemiology. From 1985 to 1996 he was also actively involved in mental health system reform in Latin American countries, working as a consultant of the Pan American Health Organization in Nicaragua, Costa Rica, Salvador, Chile, Peru and Panama. He played a key role in the process leading to the Caracas Declaration in 1990.

In 1996 Saraceno was recruited by the World Health Organization in Geneva where he became responsible of the program Nations for Mental Health, an initiative aimed at promoting the mental health of underserved populations.

In 2000 he was appointed Director of the WHO Department of Mental Health, later renamed the Department of Mental Health and Substance Abuse. In 2001 Saraceno led the preparation of the WHO World Health Report: Mental Health: New Understanding, New Hope, and of the world health day devoted to mental health with the slogan: "Stop Exclusion Dare to Care". He led the WHO Department of Mental Health and Substance Abuse until 2010 contributing to important initiatives of reform of mental health systems in many countries and working towards the promotion of the human rights of people with mental disability. He played a leading role in the process of approval of the Global Strategy on Harmful Use of Alcohol by all WHO member states. From 2007 to 2008 he was also the Director ad interim of the Department of Chronic Diseases and Health Promotion, WHO, Geneva.

In 2002 he was appointed professor of Global Health at the School of Medical Sciences of the Nova University of Lisbon, and has been one of the directors of its International Master on Mental Health Policy and Services. Saraceno has been the head of the steering committee of the Gulbenkian Global Mental Health Platform, the Chairman of the Global Initiative on Psychiatry and now is the Secretary General of the Lisbon Institute of Global Mental Health. He is the scientific director of the Center on Urban Suffering attached to the “Casa della Carità” in Milano, Italy In 2010 he was appointed Professor at the Department of Mental Health of the University of Geneva.

Saraceno's work deals with social psychiatry, epidemiology and public health with special emphasis on human rights, deinstitutionalization, psychosocial rehabilitation and global mental health. He has published more than 200 articles in scientific journals, edited 15 books and is the author of 10 books translated in different languages.

== Honours ==
In 1992 he became President of the World Association of Psychosocial Rehabilitation. In 2003 he was appointed Honorary Fellow of the Royal College of Psychiatrists, UK; in 2007 Honorary Doctor of Birmingham City University, UK; in 2007 Doctor Honoris Causa of the Universidad Nova de Lisbon; in 2016 Fellow of the Swiss School of Public Health.
