= Simone Pika =

German behavioral biologist

Simone Susanne Pika (née Klein) is a German ethologist and primatologist investigating the evolution and development of language, cognition and plasticity by focusing on distinct model systems such as corvids, great apes, monkeys and dolphins. Since 2017, she co-directs the Ozouga Chimpanzee Project, Loango National Park in Gabon. She is a full professor at the Institute of Cognitive Science, Osnabrück University, Germany.

== Career ==
Since 2017, Pika is the head of the Comparative BioCognition group at the Institute of Cognitive Science, Osnabrück University, Germany.

In 1992, Pika did her first ethological internship with Wolfgang Wickler at the Max Planck Institute for Behavioural Physiology in Seewiesen, Germany. She studied biology at the Technical University Darmstadt and the University of Münster. Her specialization in ethology at the Department of Behavioural Biology, University of Münster and contact with Norbert Sachser led to a diploma thesis on the social behavior of three great ape species living in the Zürich Zoologischer Garten in collaboration with August A. Anzenberger and Bob Martin from the University of Zürich. From 2000 to 2003, Pika did her PhD at the Max Planck Institute for Evolutionary Anthropology in Leipzig, supervised by Michael Tomasello and Norbert Sachser. In her thesis, she investigated gestural communication in bonobos and gorillas in captivity. In 2006, she accepted a postdoctoral fellowship at the University of Alberta in Canada to study gestural usage in bilingual humans.

== Research ==
Pika's research centers on the evolution and development of language, cognition and plasticity by focusing on model groups that are characterized by complex social relationships and networks. She uses a combination of methods of ethology, comparative psychology, cognitive science and artificial intelligence. Pika's work contributed to a better understanding of learning involved in gesture acquisition, gesture forms, referential use, influence of experience and social matrices on communicative output. species-specific communication styles, use of conversational rules in communicative interactions, tool-use and behavioral plasticity, development and complexity of cognition, inter-species aggression and medical behavior.

== Awards ==
In 2010, Pika was awarded with the Sofja Kovalevskaja Award of the Alexander von Humboldt Foundation. In 2017, she received an EU-Consolidator grant (772000, TurnTaking) of the European Research Council (ERC) under the European Union's Horizon 2020 research and innovation program.

== Selected publications ==
1. Mascaro, A., Southern, L. M., Deschner, T., & Pika, S. (2022). Application of insects to wounds of self and others by chimpanzees in the wild. Current Biology, 32, R97-R115. DOI: 10.1016/j.cub.2021.12.045
2. Pika, S., Sima, M. J., Blum, C. R., Herrmann, E., & Mundry, R. (2020). Ravens parallel great apes in physical and social cognitive skills. Scientific Reports, 10(20617), 19. DOI: 10.1038/s41598-020-77060-8
3. Boesch, C., Kalan, A. K., Mundry, R., Arandjelovic, M., Pika, S., Dieguez, P., Ayimisin, E. A., Barciela, A., Coupland, C., Egbem, V. E., Eno-Nku, M., Fay, J. M., Fine, D., Hernandez-Aguilar, R. A., Hermans, V., Kadam, P., Kambi, M., Llana, M., Maretti, G., ... Kühl, H. S. (2020). Chimpanzee ethnography reveals unexpected cultural diversity. Nature Human Behaviour, 4, 910-916. DOI: 10.1038/s41562-020-0890-1.
4. Pika, S., & Deschner, T. (2019). A new window onto animal culture: The case of chimpanzee gesturing. Gesture, 18(2-3), 237-258. DOI: 10.1075/gest.19012.pik
5. Pika, S., Klein, H., Bunel, S., Baas, P., Theleste, E., & Deschner, T. (2019). Wild chimpanzees (Pan troglodytes troglodytes) exploit tortoises (Kinixys erosa) via percussive technology. Sci Rep, 9(1), 7661. DOI: 10.1038/s41598-019-43301-8
6. Pika, S., & Fröhlich, M. (2019). Gestural acquisition in great apes: The social negotiation hypothesis. Animal Cognition, 22(4), 551-565. DOI: 10.1007/s10071-017-1159-6
7. Pika, S., Wilkinson, R., Kendrick, K. H., & Vernes, S. C. (2018). Taking turns: Bridging the gap between human and animal communication. Proceedings of the Royal Society B: Biological Sciences, 285(20180598), 9. DOI: 10.1098/rspb.2018.0598
8. Prieur, J., Barbu, S., Blois-Heulin, C., & Pika, S. (2017). Captive gorillas' manual laterality: The impact of gestures, manipulators and interaction specificity. Brain and Language, 175, 130-145. DOI: 10.1016/j.bandl.2017.10.001
9. Fröhlich, M., Kuchenbuch, P., Müller, G., Fruth, B., Furuichi, T., Wittig, R. M., & Pika, S. (2016). Unpeeling the layers of language: Bonobos and chimpanzees engage in cooperative turn-taking sequences. Scientific Reports, 6, 25887. DOI: 10.1038/srep25887
10. Pika, S., & Mitani, J. C. (2006). Referential gestural communication in wild chimpanzees (Pan troglodytes). Current Biology, 16(6), R191-R192. DOI: 10.1016/j.cub.2006.02.037
