= Tricia Striano =

American psychologist

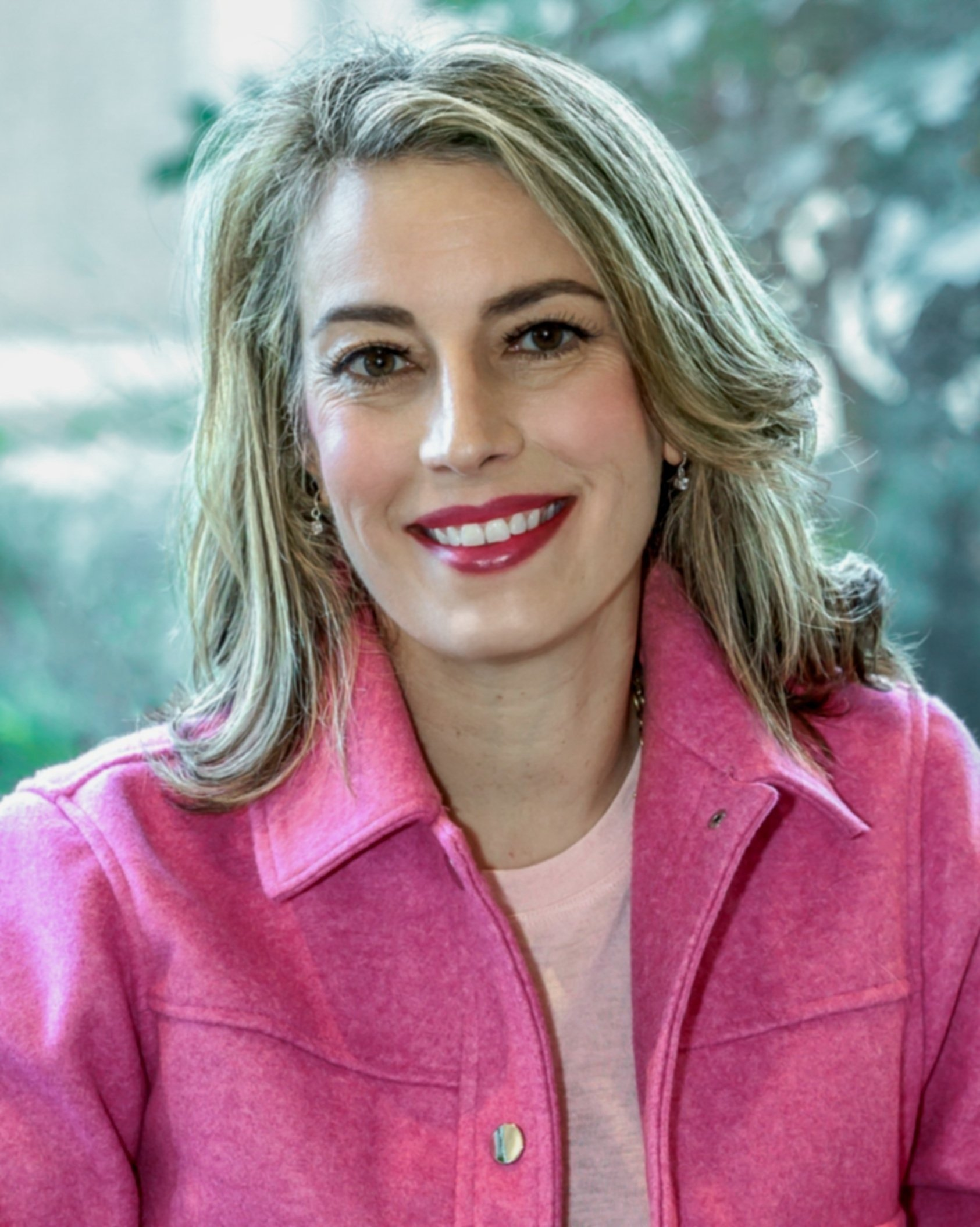
Tricia Skoler

Tricia Striano is an American psychologist who is the head of the Independent Research Group on Cultural Ontogeny at the Max Planck Institute for Evolutionary Anthropology in Leipzig, Germany.

== Career ==
Striano was born in Weymouth Massachusetts. She obtained her BA in psychology from The College of the Holy Cross. She obtained her Ph.D. in psychology from Emory University in 2000, after which she became Head of the Independent Research Group on Cultural Ontogeny at the Max Planck Institute for Evolutionary Anthropology in Leipzig, Germany. In 2004,

Tricia Striano received the Sofia Kovalevskaya Award of the Alexander von Humboldt Foundation and the Sanctae Crucis Award of the College of the Holy Cross. She built the Neurocognition and Development Research Group at the Max Planck Institute for Human Cognitive and Brain Sciences and Center for Advanced Studies at the University of Leipzig.

In 2008, Striano obtained her Habilitation from the University of Osnabruck in Germany. Tricia Striano founded Tricia Striano Inc and brand AisforBanana®.

== Research ==
Striano's main area of research is social cognition and learning in infancy, using brain and behavioral measures.

== Publications ==
=== Articles ===
- Hoehl, Stefanie; Reid, Vincent M.; Parise, Eugenio; Handl, Andrea; Palumbo, Letizia; Striano, Tricia (July 2009). "Looking at Eye Gaze Processing and Its Neural Correlates in Infancy-Implications for Social Development and Autism Spectrum Disorder". Child Development. 80 (4): 968–985. doi:10.1111/j.1467-8624.2009.01311.x. PMID 19630888.
- Hoehl, Stefanie; Wiese, Lisa; Striano, Tricia (11 June 2008). "Young Infants' Neural Processing of Objects Is Affected by Eye Gaze Direction and Emotional Expression". PLOS ONE. 3 (6) e2389. Bibcode:2008PLoSO...3.2389H. doi:10.1371/journal.pone.0002389. PMC 2405932. PMID 18545689.
  - "Three-month-old Infants Are Sensitive To Emotional Cues Referring To Objects In The World". ScienceDaily (Press release). June 13, 2008.
- Hoehl, Stefanie; Striano, Tricia (November 2008). "Neural Processing of Eye Gaze and Threat-Related Emotional Facial Expressions in Infancy". Child Development. 79 (6): 1752–1760. doi:10.1111/j.1467-8624.2008.01223.x. PMID 19037947.
- Striano, Tricia; Stahl, Daniel (July 2005). "Sensitivity to triadic attention in early infancy". Developmental Science. 8 (4): 333–343. doi:10.1111/j.1467-7687.2005.00421.x. PMID 15985067.
- Striano, Tricia; Reid, Vincent M. (October 2006). "Social cognition in the first year". Trends in Cognitive Sciences. 10 (10): 471–476. doi:10.1016/j.tics.2006.08.006. PMID 16942896. S2CID 12033849.
- Striano, Tricia; Henning, Anne; Stahl, Daniel (29 June 2006). "Sensitivity to interpersonal timing at 3 and 6 months of age". Interaction Studies. 7 (2): 251–271. doi:10.1075/is.7.2.08str.
- Striano, Tricia; Bertin, Evelin (1 August 2005). "Coordinated affect with mothers and strangers: A longitudinal analysis of joint engagement between 5 and 9 months of age". Cognition and Emotion. 19 (5): 781–790. doi:10.1080/02699930541000002. hdl:11858/00-001M-0000-0010-A65C-2. S2CID 144063734.
- Striano, Tricia (2004). "Direction of Regard and the Still-Face Effect in the First Year: Does Intention Matter?". Child Development. 75 (2): 468–479. doi:10.1111/j.1467-8624.2004.00687.x. JSTOR 3696652. PMID 15056200.
- Striano, Tricia; Tomasello, Michael; Rochat, Philippe (2001). "Social and object support for early symbolic play". Developmental Science. 4 (4): 442–455. doi:10.1111/1467-7687.00186.
- Striano, Tricia; Rochat, Philippe (1 April 2000). "Emergence of Selective Social Referencing in Infancy". Infancy. 1 (2): 253–264. doi:10.1207/S15327078IN0102_7. PMID 32680288. S2CID 145540138.
- Striano, Tricia; Rochat, Philippe (November 1999). "Developmental link between dyadic and triadic social competence in infancy". British Journal of Developmental Psychology. 17 (4): 551–562. doi:10.1348/026151099165474.

=== Books ===
- Striano, Tricia, Reid, Vincent (2009). Social cognition development, neuroscience, and autism. Wiley-Blackwell. ISBN 978-1-4051-6217-3. OCLC 1087695427.
- Reid, Vincent M.; Striano, Tricia; Koops, Willem (2007). Social Cognition During Infancy. Psychology Press. ISBN 978-1-84169-832-8.
