= Gerd Jürgens =

Gerd Jürgens (also spelt Juergens) (born 1949) is a plant developmental biologist and emeritus Director of the Cell Biology Department at the Max Planck Institute for Developmental Biology and Head of the Center for Plant Molecular Biology (ZMBP) at the Eberhard-Karls Universität Tübingen. He has published extensively in leading journals, including eight papers in the journal Nature as well as various articles in the journals Cell, Science, Journal of Cell Biology and The Plant Journal.

== Research ==
During his postdoctoral years in the 1980s he worked with Nobel Prize winners Christiane Nüsslein-Volhard and Eric Wieschaus at the European Molecular Biology Laboratory (EMBL) in Heidelberg on the topic of Drosophila melanogaster embryogenesis. At the age of 37 he made the switch from animal to plant research and became one of the first researchers to work on what was later to become the model plant organism: Arabidopsis thaliana. He was responsible for pioneering research in the genetic dissection of plant embryogenesis. Using the genetically-tractable plant Arabidopsis thaliana he conducted the first forward genetic screen (using mutagenesis with 0.3% ethyl methane sulfonate (EMS)) looking for embryonic defects. His laboratory discovered and characterized the protein KNOLLE, which is required for cytokinesis and was the first protein known to exclusively target the cell plate in plant cells. Jürgens also worked extensively on the ARF-GEF GNOM. Both knolle and gnom were first discovered in his embryonic mutant screens.

== Prizes and awards ==
Jürgens won the Gottfried Wilhelm Leibniz Prize (the highest research award in Germany) in 1995.
