= Clara Saraceno =

Laser scientist

Clara Jody Saraceno (born 1983) is a laser scientist whose research involves the development of ultrafast lasers, a technology whose applications include ultrafast laser spectroscopy, and imaging biological processes at the molecular scale. Born in Argentina and educated in France and Switzerland, she works in Germany as a professor in the Faculty for Electrical Engineering of Ruhr University Bochum, where she holds the Chair of Photonics and Ultrafast Laser Science.

== Education and career ==
Saraceno was born in 1983 in Buenos Aires, Argentina. She studied optics and photonics at the Institut d'optique Graduate School in France, part of Paris-Saclay University, after which she worked in the US for Coherent, Inc. from 2007 to 2008. Returning to graduate study at ETH Zurich in Switzerland, she completed a PhD in 2012, under the supervision of physicist Ursula Keller.

After postdoctoral research at ETH Zurich and the University of Neuchâtel in Switzerland, she joined Ruhr University Bochum in Germany as an associate professor in 2016.

== Recognition ==
Saraceno's doctoral thesis won the 2013 Quantum Electronics and Optics Division Thesis Prize of the European Physical Society. She was a 2016 recipient of the Sofia Kovalevskaya Award of the Alexander von Humboldt Foundation.

She became an Optica Ambassador in 2019, and was named as a 2022 Optica Fellow, "for seminal contributions to ultrafast science and technology, as well as outstanding service to the optics community".
