= Rosa Amelia González-Lópezlira =

Mexican astronomer

Rosa Amelia González-Lópezlira is a Mexican astronomer specializing in galaxy formation and evolution, the age distribution of stars in different regions of galaxies, and the rotation rate of globular clusters in galaxies, including the discovery of an anomalously fast rotation rate in Messier 106. She is a researcher at the National Autonomous University of Mexico (UNAM), in the UNAM Institute of Radio Astronomy and Astrophysics.

== Education and career ==
González-Lópezlira was an undergraduate physics student at UAM Iztapalapa. She went to the University of California, Berkeley for doctoral study in astronomy, completing her Ph.D. in 1996 with the dissertation Observational tracers of the dynamics and stellar populations of galactic disks: Azimuthal age gradients in M99 supervised by James R. Graham.

She was a postdoctoral researcher at the Space Telescope Science Institute, working there with Ron Allen, and joined the UNAM Institute of Radio Astronomy and Astrophysics as a researcher in 2000.

== Recognition ==
González-Lópezlira is a member of the Mexican Academy of Sciences.
