= Patricia Schady =

British astrophysicist (1978–2026)

Patricia Schady (1978 – 1 March 2026) was a British astrophysicist specializing in gamma-ray bursts and their host galaxies. At the time of her death, she was a senior lecturer at the University of Bath.

== Life and career ==
Schady was born in 1978 in the United Kingdom. After reading mathematics and computer science at University College London, she studied radio astronomy at the Jodrell Bank Centre for Astrophysics of the University of Manchester before returning to University College London for a PhD in astrophysics at the Mullard Space Science Laboratory. Her 2008 doctoral dissertation, Prompt observations of gamma-ray bursts with Swift, was jointly supervised by Keith Mason and Mat Page.

Before joining the academic staff at the University of Bath, Schady became a postdoctoral researcher at the Max Planck Institute for Extraterrestrial Physics in Garching, near Munich in Germany.

Schady died on 1 March 2026.

== Recognition ==
Schady was a 2012 recipient of the Sofia Kovalevskaya Award of the Alexander von Humboldt Foundation, funding her continued research as a group leader at the Max Planck Institute for Extraterrestrial Physics.
