= Olga Holtz =

Russian mathematician (born 1973)

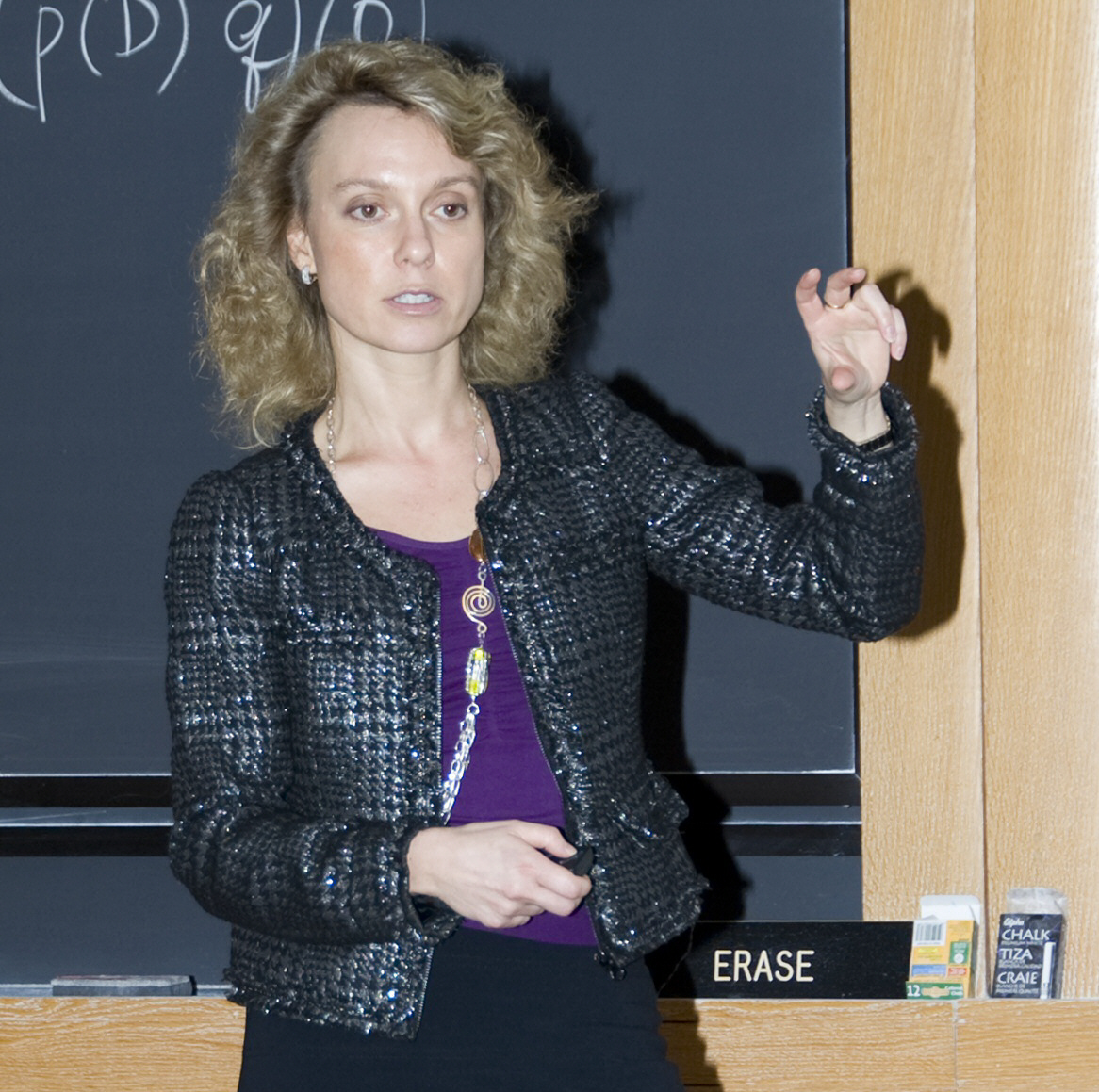
- Holtz at the Institute for Advanced Study in Princeton, October 2009
- Born: August 19, 1973 (age 53); Chelyabinsk, Soviet Union
- Education: South Ural State University; University of Wisconsin–Madison
- Awards: EMS Prize (2008)
- Scientific career
- Fields: Mathematics
- Workplaces: University of California, Berkeley, TU Berlin

Olga Holtz (Russian: Ольга Гольц; born August 19, 1973) is a Russian mathematician specializing in numerical analysis. She received the Sofia Kovalevskaya Award in 2006 and the European Mathematical Society Prize (2008). Since 2008, she is a member of the Young Academy (Junge Akademie) of Germany.

== Life ==
Holtz's early mathematical development was largely due to her parents, who were both programmers. At the age of 15, she was selected for a high school that specialized in mathematics, which she graduated from two years later. Holtz attended the South Ural State University in Chelyabinsk (1995) and the University of Wisconsin–Madison (2000), staying on at the latter until 2002 in a postdoctorate research position after earning her Ph.D. She then spent 1.5 years in Germany with a Humboldt research fellowship at the Institute of Mathematics of Technische Universität Berlin, before returning to the United States in 2004, where she held a Morrey Assistant Professorship at the Department of Mathematics of the University of California, Berkeley from 2004 to 2007.

After winning a €1,000,000 Sofia Kovalevskaya Award in 2006, Holtz built her research group at Technische Universität Berlin, where she became a Professor of applied mathematics while concurrently serving as an Associate, then Full Professor of Mathematics at University of California, Berkeley. Since then, Holtz has garnered additional honors. The European Mathematical Society awarded her its 2008 prize, and the European Research Council awarded her €880,000 Starting Grant in August 2010. In 2015 she was elected as a fellow of the American Mathematical Society "for contributions to numerical linear algebra, numerical analysis, approximation theory, theoretical computer science, and algebra".

Holtz, who considered a career in music before deciding on mathematics, performs with the Berlin Philharmonic Choir and practices ballroom dancing.
