= New Testament theology =

New Testament theology (NTT) is the branch of biblical theology that concerns the study and interpretation of the New Testament (NT). It seeks to explain the meaning of NT texts in their own grammatical, historical and cultural terms. It is separate from dogmatic theology and systematic theology. It is related but distinct from historical theology.

== Academic discipline ==
There are two main approaches to NTT. The first is reconstructing the theology of the NT writers. The second approach is to offer a systematic presentation of NT teaching. Frank Thielman uses a "canonical and synthetic approach" that addresses each NT book separately or canonically but also includes thematic or synthetic summaries.

=== History ===
==== 1700s–1914 ====
In the 17th century, attempts to prove that Protestant dogmatic theology was based in the Bible were described as biblical theology. These early works explained biblical texts according to standard outlines used in systematic theology. In the 1770s, Johann Salomo Semler argued that biblical theology needed to be separated from dogmatic theology.

Johann Philipp Gabler's 1787 lecture "On the Proper Distinction Between Biblical and Dogmatic Theology" is considered the beginning of modern biblical theology. Gabler believed the Bible was "the one clear source from which all true knowledge of the Christian religion is drawn". For Gabler, dogmatic theology must be based on a biblical theology that is "pure and unmixed with foreign elements". Gabler identified two tasks for biblical theology. The first task was to provide an accurate historical description of the ideas found in the Bible. He argued that the interpretation of biblical texts needed to be informed by the language and customs of the relevant historical period. Significantly, Gabler did not assume that the OT and NT possessed a uniformity in beliefs. Gabler's second task was to compare biblical ideas with each other to discover universal scriptural truths on which dogmatic theology could be based. While scholars took up Gabler's first task, his second task was forgotten. According to biblical scholar Frank Matera, "Instead of becoming a servant of dogmatic theology, biblical theology soon became its rival."

George Lorenz Bauer's four-volume theology published 1800–1802 marked the emergence of NTT as an independent discipline. In 1864, Ferdinand Christian Baur set forth the controversial view that early Christian beliefs were shaped by a struggle between Gentile and Jewish Christianity. Other important works of NTT were written by Bernhard Weiss (1868), Willibald Beyschlag (1891–1892), and Heinrich Julius Holtzmann (1897). Weiss and Holtzmann produced "comprehensive handbooks of NT theology that meticulously examined the doctrinal systems (Lehrbegriffe) of the various NT writers."

In his 1897 essay "The Task and Methods of 'New Testament Theology'", William Wrede criticized the work of Weiss and Holtzmann and called for a history of religions approach to NTT. This would not be limited to the biblical canon but would account for all early Christian literature. Wrede believed the field should be renamed "history of early Christian religion and theology" and that it should explain "what was believed, thought, taught, hoped, required, and striven for in the earliest period of Christianity; not what certain writings say about faith, doctrine, hope, etc." (emphasis in original). Wrede's project was never completed; although, Johannes Weiss came close with his unfinished Earliest Christianity: A History of the Period A.D. 30–150, originally published in 1914.

==== 1914–1990 ====
After World War I, the rise of dialectical theology led to a renewed interest in the theological elements of the NT. The most important work of this era was Rudolf Bultmann's Theology of the New Testament, originally published in 1948. Bultmann's work was based on three concepts. First, the primary topic of NTT is the kerygma (proclamation) about Jesus Christ. Second, this kerygma must be interpreted existentially in order to understand the human condition. Third, Bultmann rejects salvation history.

Bultmann's interpretation was shaped by form criticism, according to which the authors of the synoptic gospels mainly collected and compiled traditions about Jesus. These traditions, for the most part, were not historically authentic. While the historical Jesus was a Jewish rabbi and end-time prophet, the Christian church later proclaimed him to be messiah and lord after the Easter event. This is why Bultmann can say, "The message of Jesus is a presupposition for the theology of the New Testament rather than a part of that theology itself ... Christian faith did not exist until there was a Christian kerygma; i.e., a kerygma proclaiming Jesus Christ—specifically Jesus Christ the Crucified and Risen One—to be God’s eschatological act of salvation". Bultmann divided early Christianity into a Palestinian church and a syncretistic Hellenistic church, which included Paul and the Johannine tradition. Bultmann's Theology of the New Testament focuses mainly on Pauline and Johannine theology, which he viewed as deeply influenced by Gnosticism.

NT professor C. Kavin Rowe describes the 50 years after Bultmann as a "sterile" phase in the NTT field. Other NT theologies were written, but these failed to match Bultmann's impact.

Joachim Jeremias presented an alternative to Bultmann in his 1971 NT theology. Utilizing the criterion of dissimilarity and other techniques, Jeremias concludes in contrast to Bultmann's form criticism that "[i]n the synoptic tradition it is the inauthenticity, and not the authenticity, of the sayings of Jesus that must be demonstrated". For Jeremias, the message and work of the historical Jesus is inseparable from the church's post-Easter proclamation. In the words of Peter Stuhlmacher:

Jeremias presents us with a historically argued reversal of Bultmann’s kerygma theology: the decisive ground of faith is not found for the first time in the apostolic preaching of the crucified and risen Christ, but already in Jesus's word and work, as reliably attested in the Synoptic Gospels.

French theologian Oscar Cullmann's Salvation in History (1965) was well received among Catholic exegetes, the ecumenical world, and OT scholars. Cullmann traces salvation history to the history of Israel in the OT and sees in all the NT writings an inaugurated eschatology: salvation is already accomplished in Jesus' life, death, and resurrection, but it is not yet consummated. This consummation awaits the second coming of Christ, the final judgment, and the ultimate establishment of the kingdom of God.

Important NT theologies produced in the English-speaking world included Alan Richardson (1958), George Eldon Ladd (1974), Donald Guthrie (1981), Leon Morris (1986).

==== 1990–2000s ====
NT professor C. Kavin Rowe wrote in 2006 that the field of NTT had experienced a "revival" in recent years. Georg Strecker (1996) and Joachim Gnilka (1994) continue in the Bultmannian tradition. Both highlight the NT's theological diversity in ways that Rowe believes "render questionable its existence as a collection."

Other German scholars have moved beyond Bultmann. Reviewing the work of German scholars Ferdinand Hahn (2001, 2005), Ulrich Wilckins (2002–2005), and Peter Stuhlmacher (1991, 1999), Rowe writes:

In multiple and important ways—and regardless of their many differences—their theologies converge to provide a coherent alternative to the larger Bultmannian paradigm in NTT. Where Bultmann famously side-stepped the significance of the OT, Hahn, Wilckens, and Stuhlmacher all affirm the inseparability of the Old from the New. Where Bultmann refused the historical Jesus a part in the theology of the NT, Hahn, Wilckens, and Stuhlmacher press for the necessity of Jesus' earthly life as an essential ingredient of NTT. Where Bultmann saw deep and irreconcilable theological contradiction within the NT (the radical divergences between Paul/John and Frühkatholizismus ['Early Catholicism'], for example), Hahn, Wilckens, and Stuhlmacher argue for a discernible theological unity amidst the obvious and real diversity of the NT writings. And, finally, where Bultmann's existential interpretation clearly placed the accent on theological anthropology (human "self-understanding"), Hahn, Wilckens, and Stuhlmacher all insist on the centrality of theology proper: the NT is first of all about God.

William Wrede's ideas continue to have influence among scholars, including Heikki Räisänen (1990), Klaus Berger (1994), Walter Schmithals (1994), and Gerd Theissen (1999).

== Synoptic Gospels ==
The Gospel of Mark begins with a statement of Jesus' identity: he is "Jesus Christ, the Son of God". The name Jesus means "Yahweh saves", and Christ is a Greek title meaning "Messiah", a person anointed by God to fulfill a specific role. Not only is Jesus the messiah, but he is also God's son.

=== Birth of Jesus ===
The tradition of the virgin birth of Jesus is found in the Gospels of Matthew and Luke but not Mark or John. For Matthew, Jesus is the Messiah and Son of God whose birth fulfills the prophecy of Isaiah 7:14, "Look, the virgin shall become pregnant and give birth to a son, and they shall name him Emmanuel". The Greek Septuagint uses παρθένος ('virgin') to translate the Hebrew noun עַלְמָה (ʿalmâ), which means 'a young woman who has not yet given birth'. Paul the Apostle does not mention the virgin birth. In Galatians 4:4, he writes that Jesus was "born of a woman" (γενόμενος ἐκ γυναικός), a common Jewish figure of speech indicating that someone is a human being (see Job 14:1; Matthew 11:11).

Jesus is described as being descended from David (Matthew 1:1–16; Luke 3:23–38; Romans 1:3–4; 2 Timothy 2:8).

=== Baptism of Jesus ===
Jesus' mission begins with his baptism by John the Baptist. The Baptist's apocalyptic preaching centered on the imminent judgment of Israel. To his Jewish audience, the Baptist warns that their descent from Abraham and covenant with God will not save them from the coming destruction (Luke 3:7–9). He urged his listeners to repent and receive forgiveness, symbolized by baptism or the religious washing with water (Mark 1:4).

In the synoptic gospels, John's ministry is a fulfillment of the prophecy in Malachi 3:1 and Isaiah 40:3. He is explicitly identified with the returning Elijah (Luke 1:17; Matthew 11:14), whose role is to prepare the people for God's arrival before the final the day of judgment (Malachi 3:1, 4:5–6). The Gospel of John, however, is careful to subordinate the Baptist to Jesus and deny him the status of Elijah (John 1:6–8, 15, 19–28). This reflects the rivalry between early Christians and the Baptist's own followers.

The Baptist proclaims that one will come who is "more powerful" than him. While John baptizes with water, the coming one will baptize with the Holy Spirit and fire. He will save those who repent, but the wicked will be destroyed with unquenchable fire (Luke 3:15–17). This "coming one" can be identified as the Messiah and Son of Man. Genesis 49:10 speaks of the coming of Shiloh, and Psalm 118 mentions "the one who comes in the name of the LORD". Both of these passages were interpreted messianically in early Judaism. Daniel 7:13 states that the Son of Man will "come with the clouds of heaven." In 1 Enoch, (Note: 1 Enoch 45–49; 52; & 61–63. See also Isaiah 11; 42:6; & 52:15.) the Son of Man is described as God's anointed one who is given the seven gifts of the Spirit. He is God's representative, presiding over the judgment of the world and establishing the kingdom of God.

Jesus heard John's preaching and submitted to baptism. It is this event that marks the start of Jesus' public ministry. New Testament scholar Howard Marshall explains the significance of Jesus' baptism as follows:

As he emerges from baptism with water, he experiences the Spirit coming down from above upon him and hears a voice identifying him as "my Son; with you I am well pleased". Although this event is not described as a baptism with the Spirit, it does look as though this is the baptism of the Spirit happening to the One who will baptize others with the Spirit. In the rest of the Gospel it may be assumed that Jesus does what he does and says what he says under the guidance and power of the Spirit, who is now permanently with him (Mk 1:12; cf. Mk 3:29). The incident is something like the calling of a prophet, but the language used is reminiscent of what God says to his anointed one (i.e., the king) in Psalm 2:7 and to his servant, on whom he puts his Spirit so that he may bring justice to the world, in Isaiah 42:1–4. The effect is thus to initiate Jesus into the office of God’s coming king, since the Old Testament passages, or certainly Psalm 2, were by now understood as prophecies still awaiting fulfillment.

== See also ==
- Old Testament theology
