= Consistent eschatology =

Consistent eschatology (thorough-going eschatology) is a theory in theological and biblical studies that interprets Jesus "in exclusively eschatological terms". The view was initiated by Johannes Weiss, and "picked up, developed, and popularized" by Albert Schweitzer. It is an exclusive futuristic eschatology, the consistent interpretation of Jesus' eschatology as an expectation of an imminent end, and the thorough-going eschatology, the first position by Schweitzer. He used a thorough eschatology to provide a solution to the historical problems associated with Jesus' life. According to this view, asserted by Johannes Weiss (J. Weiß), the proclamation of Jesus, his actions and ministry are dominated by the eschatological expectation of the impending return. (For example, "the kingdom of God is at hand”. Mk. 1:15)

It has been described by one critic (George Eldon Ladd) as picturing:

Jesus as a deluded Jewish apocalyptist who proclaimed an eschatological kingdom which never came and which never can come. Jesus had no message about the rule of God in the world or his divine purpose for mankind in history. He believed, mistakenly, that God was about to break off history and establish his eschatological kingdom in which he, Jesus, would be elevated to the glorious status of the Son of Man.

As a futuristic eschatology, it is in contrast to "realized eschatology", which sees the kingdom of God as not in the future but already completed in the ministry of Jesus Christ, (realized eschatology explaining the lack of apocalyptic upheaval and conquering Kingdom of God that Jesus's followers had been expecting). It has evolved into inaugurated eschatology which started the synthesis of the consistent eschatology of Schweitzer and the realized eschatology of C. H. Dodd.

== See also ==
- Realized eschatology
- Apocalypticism
- Christian eschatology
- Idealism (Christian eschatology)
- Kingdom theology
- Jesuism
- Postmillennialism
- World to Come

== Sources ==
- George Eldon Ladd (1959). The Gospel of the Kingdom: Scriptural Studies in the Kingdom of God. Wm. B. Eerdmans Publishing. ISBN 978-0-8028-1280-3.
- Albert Schweitzer, The Mystery of the Kingdom of God: The Secret of Jesus' Messiahship and Passion. (1914), Prometheus Books. 1985. ISBN 0-87975-294-7
