= Eternal life (Christianity) =

Concept of continued life after death

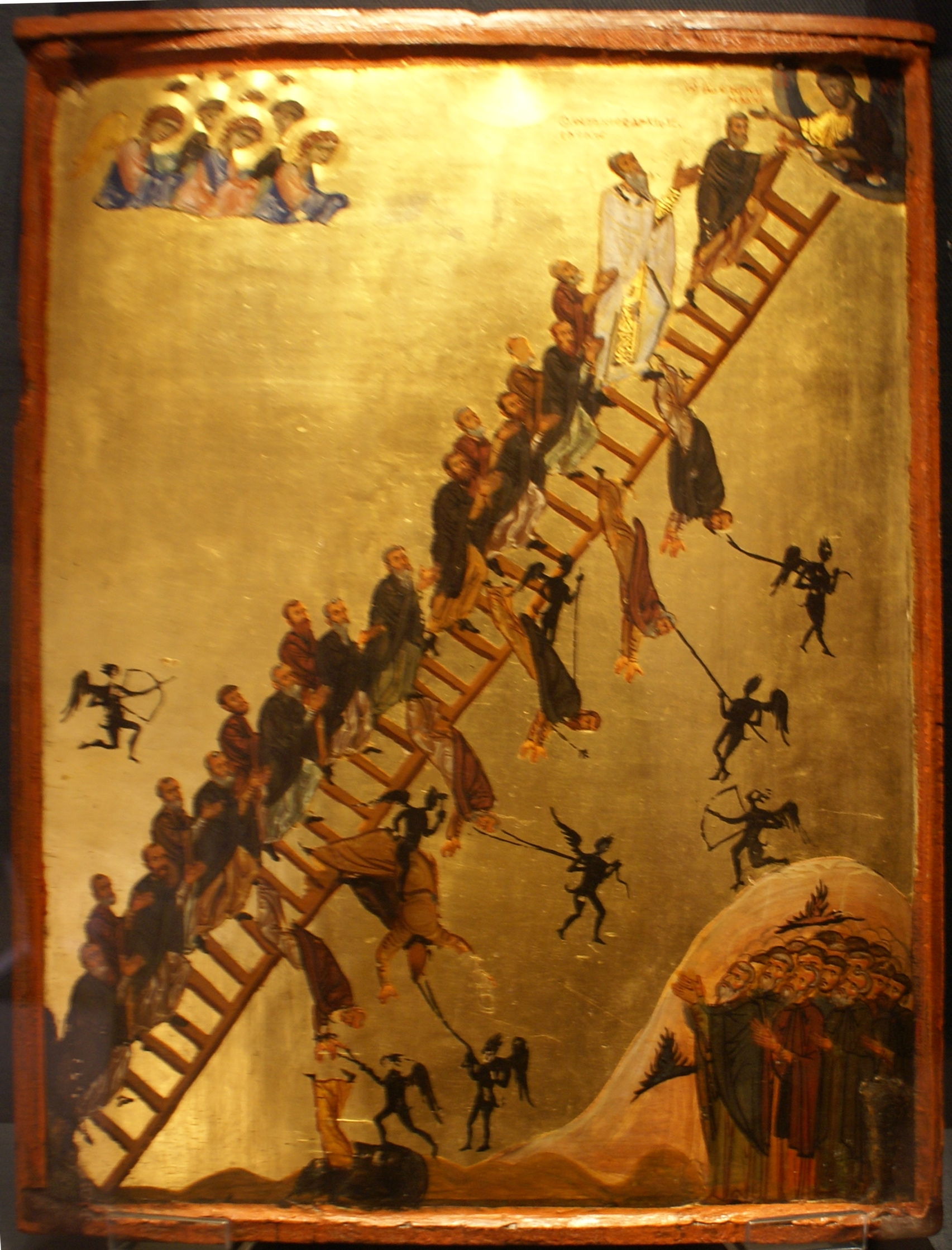
The Ladder of Divine Ascent is an important icon kept and exhibited at Saint Catherine's Monastery, Sinai, situated at the base of Mount Sinai in Egypt. The gold ground is typical of icons such as this, which was manufactured in the 12th century after a manuscript written by the 6th century monk John Climacus who based it on the biblical description of Jacob's ladder. It depicts the ascent to Heaven by monks, some of whom fall and are dragged away by black demons.

Eternal life traditionally refers to continued life after death, as outlined in Christian eschatology. The Apostles' Creed testifies: "I believe... the resurrection of the body, and life everlasting." In this view, eternal life commences after the Second Coming of Jesus Christ and the resurrection of the dead, although in the New Testament's Johannine literature there are references to eternal life commencing in the earthly life of the believer, possibly indicating an inaugurated eschatology.

According to mainstream Christian theology, after death but before the Second Coming, the saved live with God in an intermediate state, but after the Second Coming, experience the physical resurrection of the dead and the physical recreation of a New Earth. The Catechism of the Catholic Church states, "By death the soul is separated from the body, but in the resurrection God will give incorruptible life to our body, transformed by reunion with our soul. Just as Christ is risen and lives for ever, so all of us will rise at the last day." N.T. Wright argues that "God's plan is not to abandon this world... Rather, he intends to remake it. And when he does, he will raise all people to new bodily life to live in it. That is the promise of the Christian gospel."

In the Synoptic Gospels and the Pauline Letters, eternal life is generally regarded as a future experience, but the Gospel of John differs from them in its emphasis on eternal life as a "present possession". Raymond E. Brown points out that in the Synoptic Gospels eternal life is something received at the final judgment, or the Age to Come (Mark 10:30, Matthew 18:8-9) but the Gospel of John positions eternal life as a present possibility, as in John 5:24.

Thus, unlike the synoptics, in the Gospel of John eternal life is not only futuristic, but also pertains to the present. In John, those who accept Christ can possess life "here and now" as well as in eternity, for they have "passed from death to life", as in John 5:24: "He who hears my word, and believes him that sent me, has eternal life, and comes not into judgment, but has passed out of death into life." In John, the purpose for the incarnation, death, resurrection and glorification of The Word was to provide eternal life to humanity.

== In the New Testament ==
Scholars such as John H. Leith assert that eternal life is never described in detail in the New Testament, although assurances are provided that the faithful will receive it. Other scholars such as D. A. Carson suggest that eternal life is explicitly defined in John 17:3, where Jesus says in his High Priestly Prayer, "Now this is eternal life: that they may know you, the only true God, and Jesus Christ, whom you have sent." Carson says of this verse that "Eternal life turns on nothing more and nothing less than knowledge of the true God" and that it is "not so much everlasting life as personal knowledge of the Everlasting One." The Eerdmans Dictionary of the Bible on the other hand, contends that "the nature of eternal life is only sketched in its essential elements in the New Testament".

John W. Ritenbaugh says that eternal life is knowing God, and that Jesus implies an intimate relationship with God that matures over time.

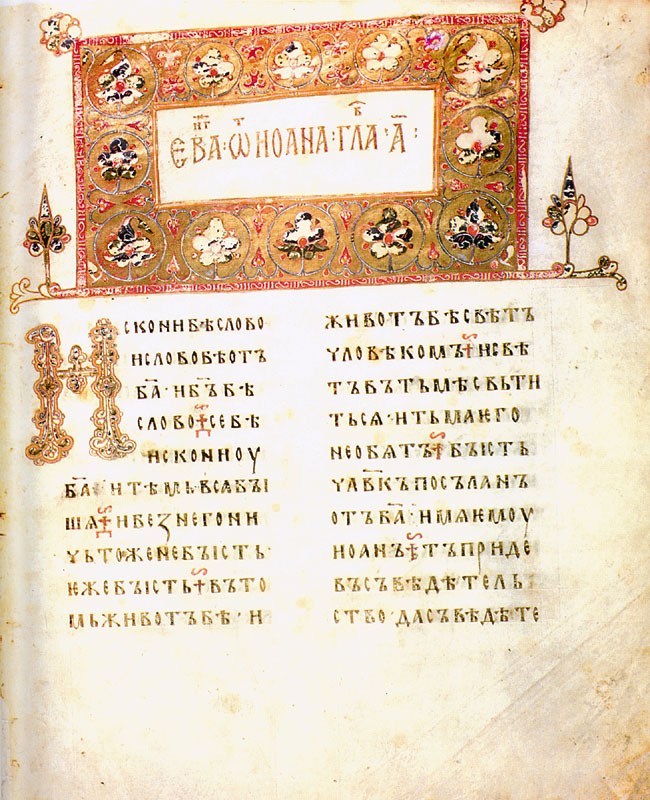
Ostromir Gospel of John, 1056

While the Synoptic Gospels are seen as focusing on the proclamation of the Kingdom of God, some scholars see eternal life as the central theme of Jesus' preaching in the Gospel of John, where receiving eternal life is seen to be synonymous with entering the Kingdom. In Christian teachings, eternal life is not an inherent part of human existence, and is a unique gift from God, based on the model of the Resurrection of Jesus, viewed as a unique event through which death was conquered "once for all", permitting Christians to experience eternal life. This eternal life is provided to believers, generally assumed to be at the resurrection of the dead.

In New Testament theology, in addition to "life" (zoe, i.e. ζωὴ in Greek), there is also a promised spiritual life sometimes described by the adjective eternal (aionios i.e. αἰώνιος in Greek) but other times simply referred to as "life". In both John and Paul the possibility of attaining eternal life and avoiding the wrath of God is dependent on believing in Jesus, the Son of God. For John abiding in Christ involves love for one another, as in John 15:9-17, and John 5:24. The existence of divine love in believers, then facilitates the influence of the gospel on the world, and lead to widespread salvation. 1 John 3:14 then manifests "the already but not yet" acquisition of eternal life by referring to the acquisition of eternal life as a once for all (ephapax) event, and the role of love in attaining it: "We know that we have passed from death to life, because we love each other. Anyone who does not love remains in death", somewhat reminiscent of the words of Jesus in John 5:24.

=== Pauline letters ===
In the Pauline epistles, eternal life becomes possible in the person of Christ, where by the grace of God and through faith in Christ humans can receive the gift of eternal life. For Paul (as in Galatians 6:8) future eternal life arrives as a result of the indwelling of the Holy Spirit during the present life. Paul views sin as an obstacle to attaining eternal life, as in Romans 6:23. For Paul eternal life is a future possession and "the eschatological goal towards which believers strive." Paul emphasizes that eternal life is not merely something to be earned, but a gift from God, as in Romans 6:23: "wages of sin is death; but the free gift of God is eternal life in Christ Jesus our Lord." Romans 6:23 thus also counter-positions sin and eternal life: while sin results in death, those who are "in Christ" will reap eternal life.

Paul also discusses the relationship of eternal life to the Holy Spirit, stating that to be with the Spirit and to think with the Spirit leads to eternal life, e.g. Galatians 6:8: :"he who sows to the Spirit shall of the Spirit reap eternal life." For Paul future eternal life arrives as a result of the indwelling of the Holy Spirit during the present life, and the inter-related statements about the present life, the Spirit and future life form a key element of the teachings on the topic in Galatians.

1 Timothy 1:16 characterizes Christians by reference to eternal life and calls the followers of Jesus: "an ensample of them that should thereafter believe on him unto eternal life." and 6:12 advises them to "fight the good fight of the faith, lay hold on the life eternal".

=== Synoptic Gospels ===
The New Testament includes fifteen occurrences of the word life, eight of these including the adjective eternal.

There are parallels in how the synoptics refer to "being saved" and John refers to eternal life, as in the table below:

Matthew 16:25	Mark 8:35	Luke 9:24	John 12:25
... whosoever shall lose his life for my sake shall find it.	... whosoever shall lose his life for my sake and the gospel's shall save it.	... whosoever shall lose his life for my sake, the same shall save it.	... he that hates his life in this world shall keep it unto life eternal.

In the Gospel of Luke, the Parable of the Good Samaritan begins with a question about eternal life in 10:25 when a lawyer asks Jesus what he needs to do to "inherit eternal life".

The Gospel of Matthew includes references to eternal life, in 19:16, 19:29 and 25:46. The reference in Matthew 19:16 is within the parable of Jesus and the rich young man which also appears in Mark 10:17–31 and Luke 18:18–30. This parable relates the term "eternal life" to entry into the Kingdom of God. The parable starts by a question to Jesus from the young man: "what good thing shall I do, that I may have eternal life?" and Jesus advises him to keep the commandments, and then refers to entry into the "Kingdom of God" in the same context.

=== Johannine literature ===
For God so loved the world, that he gave his only begotten Son, that whosoever believeth on him should not perish, but have eternal life.

— John 3:16

The Johannine concept of eternal life differs from the synoptic view. Johannine writings specifically present the view of eternal life as not simply futuristic, but also pertaining to the present, so those who hear the words of Jesus and trust in Yahweh can possess life "here and now" as well as in eternity, for they have "passed from death to life", as in John 5:24. Overall, the New Testament balances the present and future with respect to eternal life: the believer has passed from death to eternal life, but this remains to be totally realized in the future.

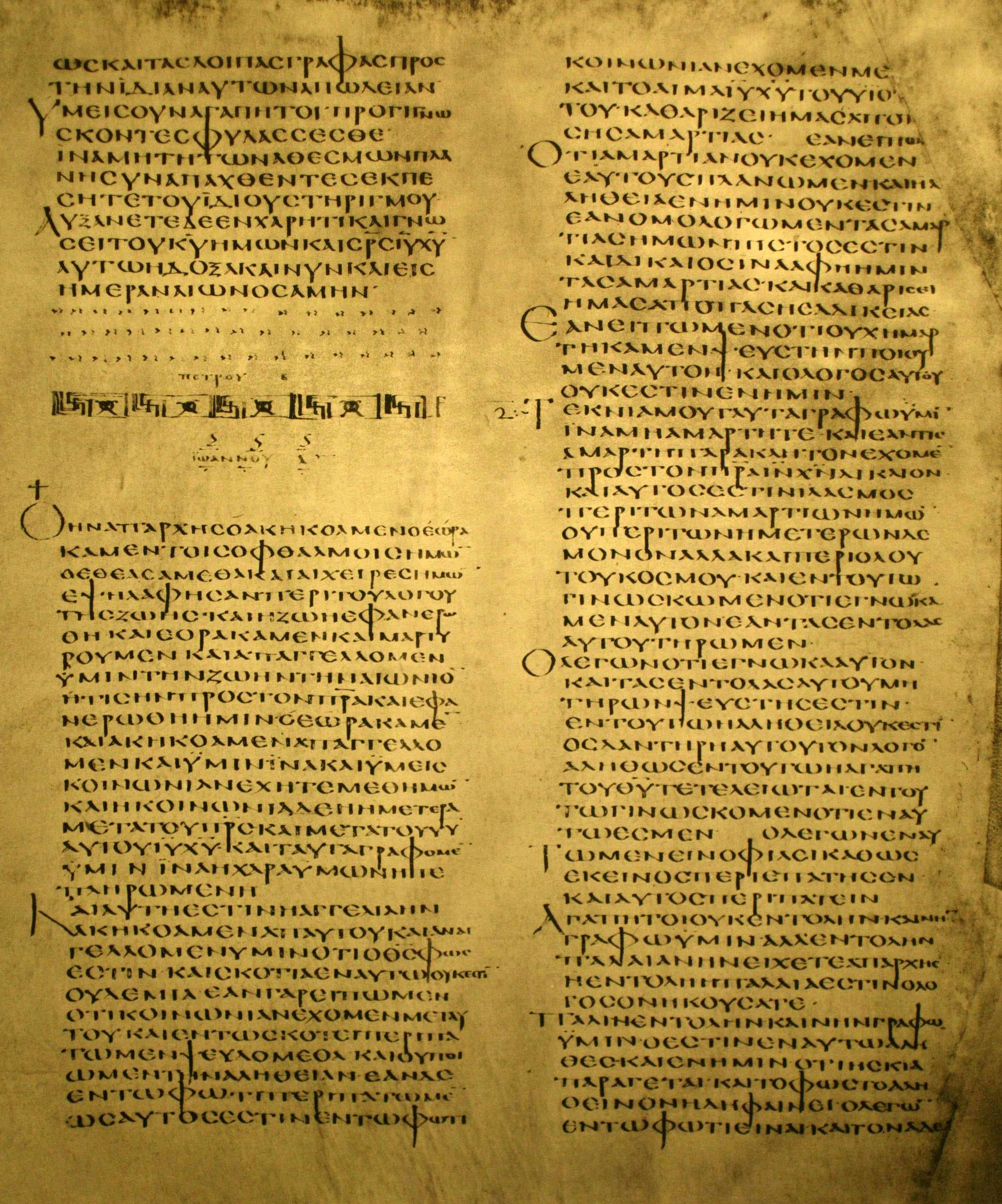
First Epistle of John in Codex Alexandrinus, 5th century

There are about 37 uses of the word life in the Gospel of John, of which about half refer to eternal life. There are six appearances in 1 John. The concept so permeates Johannine writings that in many cases one may just read life as eternal life.

Reformed evangelical theologian D. A. Carson sees John 5:24 as giving the "strongest affirmation of inaugurated eschatology in the Fourth Gospel": it is not necessary for the believer to "wait until the last day to experience something of resurrection life." George Eldon Ladd points out that, like the Kingdom of God, eternal life is "not only an eschatological gift belonging to the Age to Come; it is also a gift to be received in the old aeon". In this context, the gift of eternal life in the old aeon in which sin and death are still present is contrasted with eternal life in the new aeon of life and righteousness, the World to Come to which the faithful will belong.

However, although as in John 3:16 God has provided the gift of eternal life to believers, the possibility of perishing (απόληται) remains if one rejects Jesus. According to John 3:36, "He that believeth on the Son hath eternal life; but he that obeyeth not the Son shall not see life, but the wrath of God abideth on him."

Towards the end of the Gospel of John (20:31), the purpose of writing the Fourth Gospel is stated as: "so that you may believe that Jesus is the Christ, the Son of God, and that by believing you may have life in his name". This is often correlated to 1 John 5:13: "These things I have written to you who believe in the name of the Son of God, so that you may know that you have eternal life."

John's Gospel positions eternal life around the person of Jesus, the Christ. In the Johannine view Christ can reveal life to humans because he is life himself. 1 John 1:2: "proclaim to you the eternal life, which was with the Father and was manifested to us" is compared to John 1:1: "and the Word was with God", referring to the pre-existence of Christ.

The term is used in the Gospel of John in the context of the Water of Life and John 4:14 states: "the water that I shall give him shall become in him a well of water springing up unto eternal life."

In John 6:51 Jesus states that: "he who eats my flesh and drinks my blood has eternal life, and I will raise him up at the last day." This has been transposed, not only into a relationship with Jesus in common with Christian Theology but also into the Eucharist as an element of obtaining eternal life. The Catechism of the Catholic Church (item 1212) teaches that Christians are born through the sacrament of Baptism and receive the "food of eternal life" in the Eucharist.

In John 10:27–28 Jesus states that: "My sheep hear my voice, and I know them, and they follow me: and I give unto them eternal life; and they shall never perish." This refers to the personal, heart to heart relationship the Christian is expected to have with Jesus.

Another use is in John 17:3: "And this is life eternal, that they should know thee the only true God, and him whom thou didst send, Jesus Christ", this usage relating to the "theme of life" in the Book of Revelation.

== Teaching by denomination ==
=== Catholic Church ===
The Catholic church teaches that salvation to eternal life and the renewal of the present earthly reality both figure in "Christ's redemptive work" and in the mission of those who follow him. This redemptive work,

"while essentially concerned with the salvation of men, includes also the renewal of the whole temporal order. Hence the mission of the Church is not only to bring the message and grace of Christ to men but also to penetrate and perfect the temporal order with the spirit of the Gospel. In fulfilling this mission of the Church, the Christian laity exercise their apostolate both in the Church and in the world, in both the spiritual and the temporal orders. These orders, although distinct, are so connected in the singular plan of God that He Himself intends to raise up the whole world again in Christ and to make it a new creation, initially on earth and completely on the last day."

==== Particular judgement ====
The term "judgment" is used for two things: the Particular Judgment which occurs at death, and the General Judgment which occurs at the return of Christ, at the resurrection of the dead.

==== Purgatory ====
The Catholic Church teach that there is a state called Purgatory where souls who have died in a state of grace by Christ, and so have passed the Particular Judgment, are purged of any remaining inappropriate worldly attachments or trace of sin, ready for the love of Christ, before the Final Judgment.

==== Bodily resurrection ====
The Catechism of the Catholic Church states, "By death the soul is separated from the body, but in the resurrection God will give incorruptible life to our body, transformed by reunion with our soul. Just as Christ is risen and lives for ever, so all of us will rise at the last day."

==== Heaven ====
After judgment, the saved will enjoy the beatific vision of God:

"This perfect life with the Most Holy Trinity this communion of life and love with the Trinity, with the Virgin Mary, the angels and all the blessed is called "heaven'. Heaven is the ultimate end and fulfilment of the deepest human longings, the state of supreme, definitive happiness.

— Catechism of the Catholic Church

In this new universe God "will wipe away every tear from their eyes, and death shall be no more, neither shall there be mourning nor crying nor pain any more, for the former things have passed away".

==== Hell ====
Catholic teaching states hell is "a state of definitive self-exclusion from communion with God and the blessed" It notes "God predestines no one to go to hell; for this, a willful turning away from God (a mortal sin) is necessary, and persistence in it until the end." In their life on earth, someone in mortal sin should turn to God, who Catholics conceive of as having unlimited mercy.

According to some theologians the church does not teach how populated Hell is, if at all.

==== States ====
Pope John Paul II taught that heaven, hell and purgatory are not places per se, but states of the human soul or "conditions of existence", They have historically been spoken of figuratively as places.

Though many saints have had visions of heaven, hell or purgatory, (some in ecstatic or lurid detail) the Catholic Church teaches minimally on them, noting that the "new heaven and new earth" is a mysterious renewal whose details God has not revealed, and that "the blessed communion between God and those in Christ is beyond all description and understanding".

=== Seventh-day Adventists ===
Seventh-day Adventists believe that only God has inherent unconditional immortality, all humans can only possess immortality conditionally through faith in Jesus as a gift, unbelievers will eternally perish or cease to exist. This belief is based on biblical texts such as; John 3:16 which states; “For God so loved the world, that he gave his only begotten Son, that whosoever believeth in him should not perish, but have everlasting life” as well as other verses: ( 1 Tim 6:16, Gen 2:17, 3:1-5, 22, Matt 25:46, John 10:28, Rom 7:6-8, Rom 6:23, 1 Tim 6:19, 1 John 5:11-13, 1 Cor 15:33-34, Luke 20:36, Matt 10:28). This view is called conditional immortality

Adventist also believe that when a person dies, death is a state of unconscious sleep until the resurrection. They base this belief on biblical texts such as Ecclesiastes 9:5 which states "the dead know nothing", and 1 Thessalonians 4:13–18 which contains a description of the dead being raised from the grave at the second coming.

"And the LORD God formed man of the dust of the ground, and breathed into his nostrils the breath of life; and man became a living soul." (cf. Gen 2:7)

The text of Genesis 2:7 clearly states that God breathed into the formed man the "breath of life" and man became a living soul. He did not receive a living soul; he became one. The New King James Bible states that "man became a living being". According to the Scriptures, only man received life in this way from God. Because of this man is the only living creature to have a soul.

"And out of the ground the Lord God formed every beast of the field ... wherein is the breath of life." (cf. Genesis 2:19, 7:15)

"Both man and beast ... have all one breath, so that a man hath no preeminence above the beast."(cf. Ecclesiastes 3:19)

Of the many references to soul and spirit in the Bible, never once is either the soul or the spirit declared to be immortal, imperishable or eternal. Indeed, only God has immortality unconditionally (1 Timothy 1:17; 6:16). Adventists teach that the resurrection of the righteous will take place at the second coming of Jesus, at which time they will be restored to life and taken to reside in Heaven, while the wicked be resurrected to face Judgment and be eternally destroyed or annihilated.

=== Jehovah's Witnesses ===
Jehovah's Witnesses believe the word soul (nephesh or psykhe) as used in the Bible is a person, an animal, or the life a person or animal enjoys. Hence, the soul is not part of man, but is the whole man—man as a living being. Hence, when a person or animal dies, the soul dies, and death is a state of non-existence, based on Psalms 146:4, Ezekiel 18:4, and other passages. Hell (Hades) is not a place of fiery torment, but rather the common grave of humankind, a place of unconsciousness.

One group, referenced as "the little flock" of 144,000 people, will receive immortality and go to heaven to rule as Kings and Priests with Christ during the thousand years. As for the rest of humankind, after the final judgment, it is expected that the righteous will receive eternal life and live forever on an Earth turned into a paradise.

Those granted eternal life in heaven are immortal and cannot die by any cause. Even God himself typically wouldn't kill them. They teach that Jesus was the first to be rewarded with heavenly immortality, but that Revelation 7:4 and Revelation 14:1, 3 refer to a literal number (144,000) of additional people who will become "self-sustaining", that is, not needing anything outside themselves (food, sunlight, etc.) to maintain their own life.

They make a distinction between immortality and eternal life in that humans who have passed the final judgement and were rewarded "eternal life" can still technically lose that life and die if they were ever hypothetically sin at some future point in time, though they do not succumb to disease or old age, due to their living forever still being subject to obedience. They also still continue to be dependent on food, water, air, and such to maintain life. Nevertheless, those who pass that final test are "guaranteed" to remain faithful throughout all eternity due to the test being perfect and designed to eliminate those who would ever misuse their free will.

=== Latter Day Saints ===
In Latter-day Saint (Mormonism) theology, the spirit and the body constitute the human soul. Whereas the human body is subject to death on earth, they believe that the spirit never ceases to exist and that one day the spirits and bodies of all mankind will be reunited again. This doctrine stems from their belief that the resurrection of Jesus Christ grants the universal gift of immortality to every human being.

Joseph Smith Jr., the founder of the Latter Day Saint movement, provided a description of the afterlife based upon a vision he received, which is recorded in the Doctrine and Covenants. According to the 76th section of the LDS scripture, the afterlife consists of three degrees or kingdoms of glory, called the Celestial Kingdom, the Terrestrial Kingdom, and the Telestial Kingdom. Other Biblical scriptures speak of varying degrees of glory, such as 1 Corinthians 15:40–41: "There are also celestial bodies, and bodies terrestrial: but the glory of the celestial is one, and the glory of the terrestrial is another. There is one glory of the sun, and another glory of the moon, and another glory of the stars: for one star differeth from another star in glory."

The few who do not inherit any degree of glory (though they are resurrected) reside in a state called outer darkness, which, though not a degree of glory, is often discussed in this context. Only those known as the "Sons of Perdition" are condemned to this state.

== Other Christian beliefs ==
The doctrine of conditional immortality states the human soul is naturally mortal, and that immortality is granted by God as a gift. The doctrine is a "significant minority evangelical view" that has "grown within evangelicalism in recent years".

Some sects who hold to the doctrine of baptismal regeneration also believe in a third realm called Limbo, which is the final destination of souls who have not been baptised, but who have been innocent of mortal sin. Souls in Limbo include unbaptised infants and those who lived virtuously but were never exposed to Christianity in their lifetimes. Christian Scientists believe that sin brought death, and that death will be overcome with the overcoming of sin.

== See also ==
- Abundant life
- Nirvana
- Eternal oblivion
- Eternal sin
- Light of the World
