= Kingdom of God (Christianity) =

Phrase in the New Testament

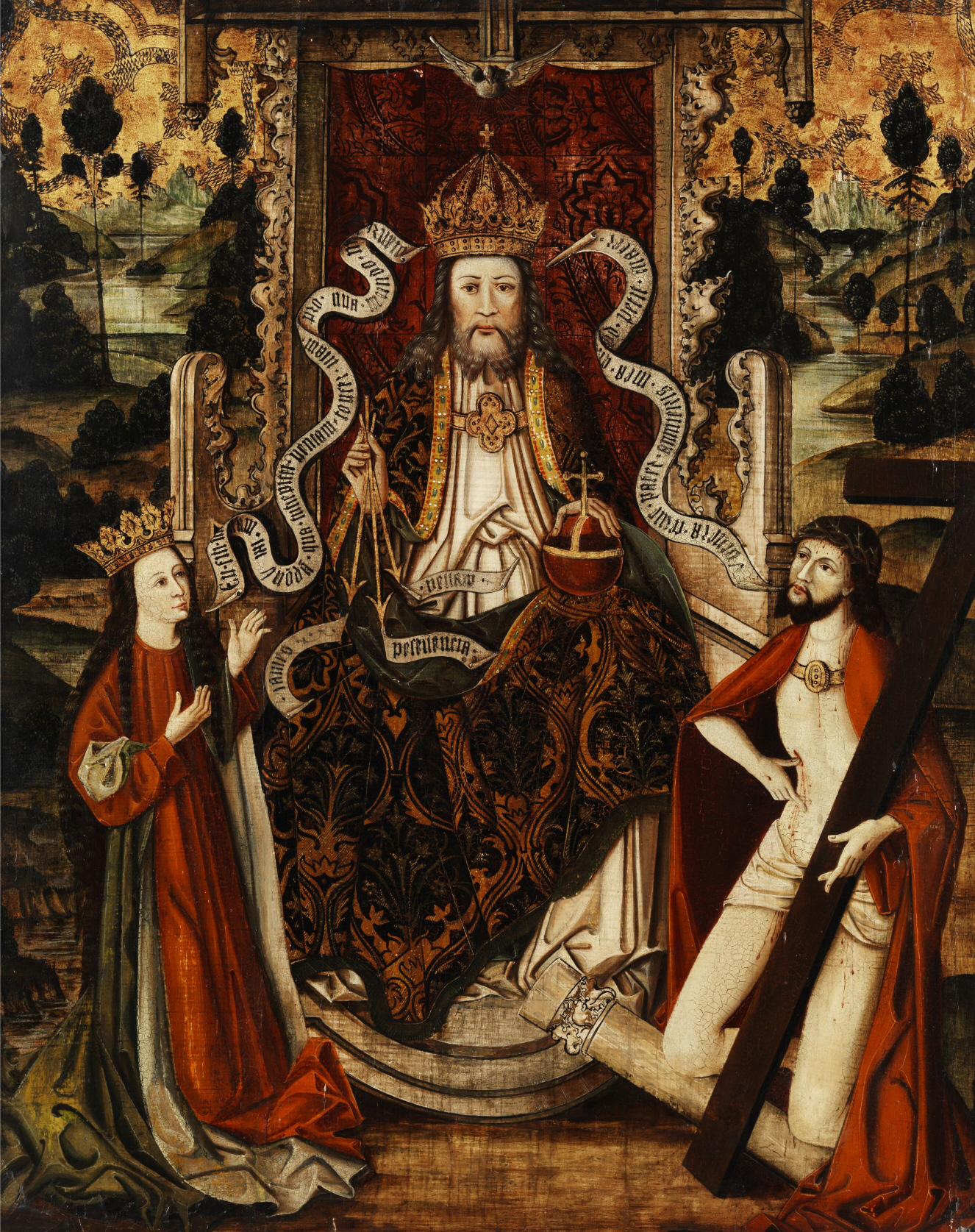
God the Father on his throne, Westphalia, Germany, late 15th century.

The Kingdom of God (and its related form the Kingdom of Heaven in the Gospel of Matthew) is one of the key elements of the teachings of Jesus in the New Testament. Drawing on Old Testament teachings, the Christian characterization of the relationship between God and humanity inherently involves the notion of the Kingship of God. The Old Testament refers to "God the Judge of all" and the notion that all humans will eventually "be judged" is an essential element of Christian teachings. Building on a number of New Testament passages, the Nicene Creed indicates that the task of judgment is assigned to Jesus.

The New Testament is written against the backdrop of Second Temple Judaism. The view of the kingdom developed during that time included the restoration of Israel to a Davidic Kingdom and the intervention of God in history via the Danielic Son of Man. The coming of the kingdom of God involved God finally taking back the reins of history, which he had allowed to slacken as pagan Empires had ruled the nations. Most Jewish sources imagine a restoration of Israel and either a destruction of the nations or a gathering of the nations to obedience to the One True God. Jesus stands firmly in this tradition. His association of his own person and ministry with the "coming of the kingdom" indicates that he perceives that God's great intervention in history has arrived and that he is the agent of that intervention. However, in the Parable of the Mustard Seed, Jesus seems to indicate that his own view on how the kingdom of God arrives differs from the Jewish traditions of his time. It is commonly believed that this multiple-attested parable suggests that the growth of the kingdom of God is characterized by a gradual process rather than an event, and that it starts small like a seed and gradually grows into a large firmly rooted tree. His suffering and death, however, seem to cast doubt upon this (how could God's appointed king be killed?) but his resurrection affirms his claim with the ultimate proof of only God having resurrection power over death. The claim includes his exaltation to the right hand of God and establishes him as "king". Jesus' predictions of his return make it clear that God's kingdom is not yet fully realized according to inaugurated eschatology but in the meantime the good news that forgiveness of sins is available through his name is to be proclaimed to the nations. Thus the mission of the Church begins and fills the time between the initial coming of the Kingdom, and its ultimate consummation with the Final Judgment.

Christian interpretations or usage of the term "kingdom of God" regularly make use of this historical framework and are often consistent with the Jewish hope of a Messiah, the person, and ministry of Jesus Christ, his death and resurrection, his return, and the rise of the Church in history. A question characteristic to the central theme of most interpretations is whether the "kingdom of God" has been instituted because of the appearance of Jesus Christ or whether it is yet to be instituted; whether this kingdom is present, future or is omnipresent simultaneously in both the present and future existence.

The term "kingdom of God" has been used to mean Christian lifestyle, a method of world evangelization, the rediscovery of charismatic gifts and many other things. Others relate it not to our present or future earthly situation but to the world to come. The interpretation of the phrase is often based on the theological leanings of the scholar-interpreter. A number of theological interpretations of the term the Kingdom of God have thus appeared in its eschatological context, e.g., apocalyptic, realized or Inaugurated eschatologies, yet no consensus has emerged among scholars.

== Etymology ==
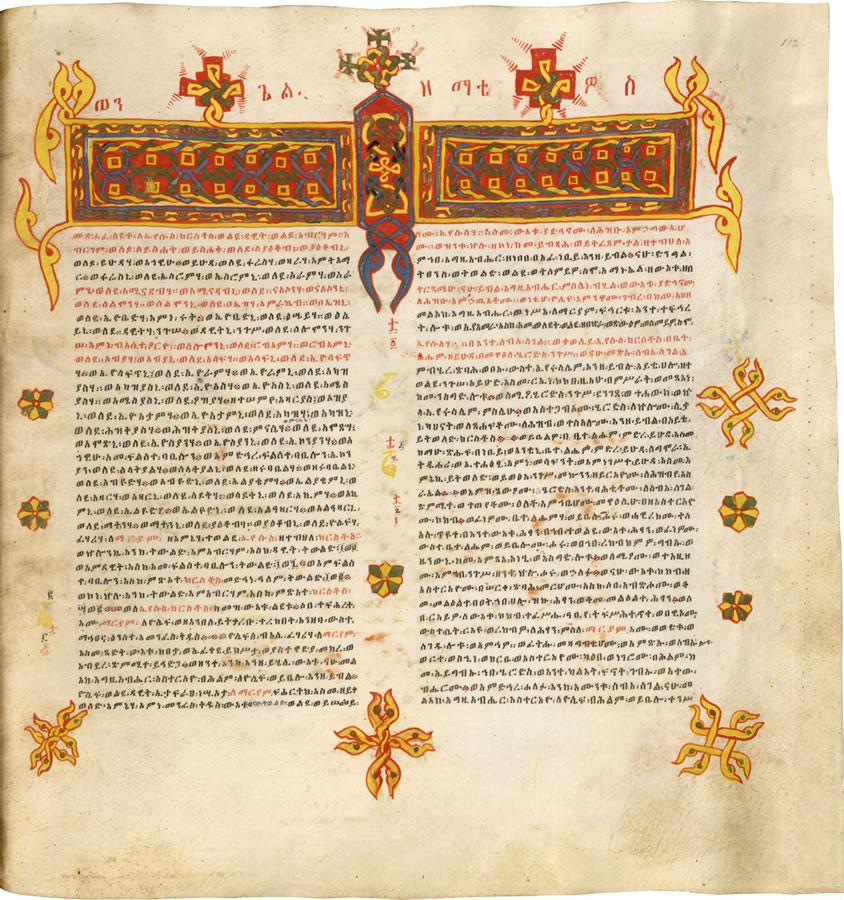
Gospel of Matthew, c. 1700

The word Kingdom (in Greek: βασιλεία basileíā) appears 162 times in the New Testament and most of these uses relate to either basileíā toû Theoû (βασιλεία τοῦ Θεοῦ) i.e. the Kingdom of God or to basileíā tō̂n Ouranō̂n (βασιλεία τῶν Οὐρανῶν) i.e. Kingdom of Heaven in the Synoptic Gospels. Kingdom of God is translated to Latin as Regnum Dei and the Kingdom of Heaven as Regnum caelorum. Kingdom of Heaven (Basileíā tō̂n Ouranō̂n) appears 32 times in the Gospel of Matthew and nowhere else in the New Testament. Matthew also uses the term the Kingdom of God (Basileíā toû Theoû) in a handful of cases, but in these cases, it may be difficult to distinguish his usage from the Kingdom of Heaven (Basileíā tō̂n Ouranō̂n).

There is general agreement among scholars that the term used by Jesus himself would have been "Kingdom of God". Matthew's use for the term the Kingdom of Heaven is generally seen as a parallel to the usage of Kingdom of God in Mark and Luke's gospels. Matthew is likely to have used the term Heaven due to the fact that the background of his Jewish audience imposed restrictions on the frequent use of the name of God. R.T. France suggests that in the few cases where the Kingdom of God is used, Matthew seeks a more specific and personal reference to God and hence goes back to that term.

== Kingship and kingdom ==
The Christian characterization of the relationship between God and humanity involves the notion of the "Kingship of God", whose origins go back to the Old Testament, and may be seen as a consequence of the creation of the world by God. The "enthronement psalms" (Psalms 45, 93, 96, 97–99) provide a background for this view with the exclamation "The Lord is King". However, in later Judaism a more "national" view was assigned to God's Kingship in which the awaited Messiah may be seen as a liberator and the founder of a new state of Israel.

The kingdom of God is first introduced in 1 Chronicles 28:5 1 Chronicles 28:5 - David Commissions Solomon, then in 2 Chronicles 13:8 1 Chronicles 13:8 - Uzzah Touches the Ark, and Daniel 2:44, where the prophet Daniel foretells a coming kingdom that would begin during the days of the Roman Empire (Daniel 2:44). The term "Kingdom of God" does not appear in the Old Testament, although "his Kingdom" and "your Kingdom" are used in some cases when referring to God. However, the Kingdom of God (the Matthean equivalent being "Kingdom of Heaven") is a prominent phrase in the Synoptic Gospels and there is near-unanimous agreement among scholars that it represents a key element of the teachings of Jesus.

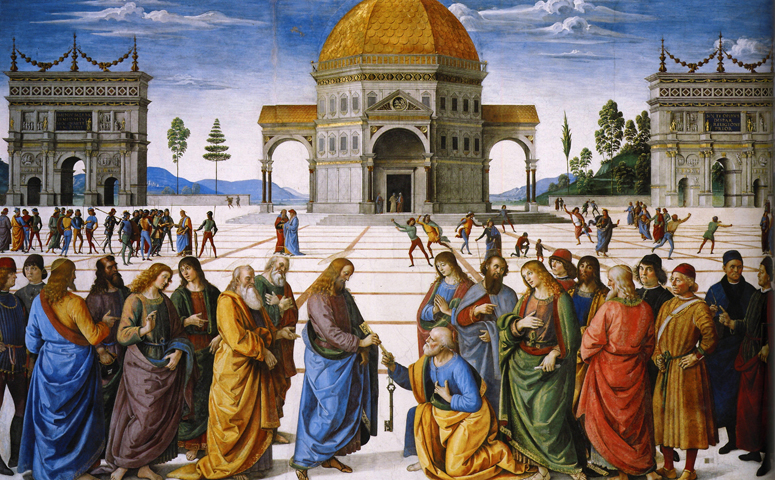
Jesus giving Peter "the keys of the kingdom of heaven", (Matthew 16:18), depicted by Perugino, 1492.

Historically, the Church Fathers presented three separate interpretations of the Kingdom of God: the first (by Origen in the 3rd century) was that Jesus himself represents the Kingdom. The second interpretation (also by Origen) is that the Kingdom represents the hearts and minds of the faithful captured by the love of God and the pursuit of Christian teachings. The third interpretation (influenced by Origen but brought forth by Eusebius in the 4th century) is that the Kingdom represents the Christian Church composed of the faithful.

Over the centuries a wide range of theological interpretations for the term Kingdom of God have appeared. For instance, in Catholic teachings, the official declaration Dominus Iesus (item 5) states that the kingdom of God cannot be detached either from Christ or from the Church, for "if the kingdom is separated from Jesus, it is no longer the kingdom of God which he revealed." Eastern Orthodox Christians believe that the Kingdom of God is present within the Church and is communicated to believers as it interacts with them.

R. T. France has pointed out that while the concept of "Kingdom of God" has an intuitive meaning to lay Christians, there is hardly any agreement among theologians about its meaning in the New Testament. Some scholars see it as a Christian lifestyle, some as a method of world evangelization, some as the rediscovery of charismatic gifts, others relate it to no present or future situation, but the world to come. France states that the phrase the Kingdom of God is often interpreted in many ways to fit the theological agenda of those interpreting it.

== Eschatology ==
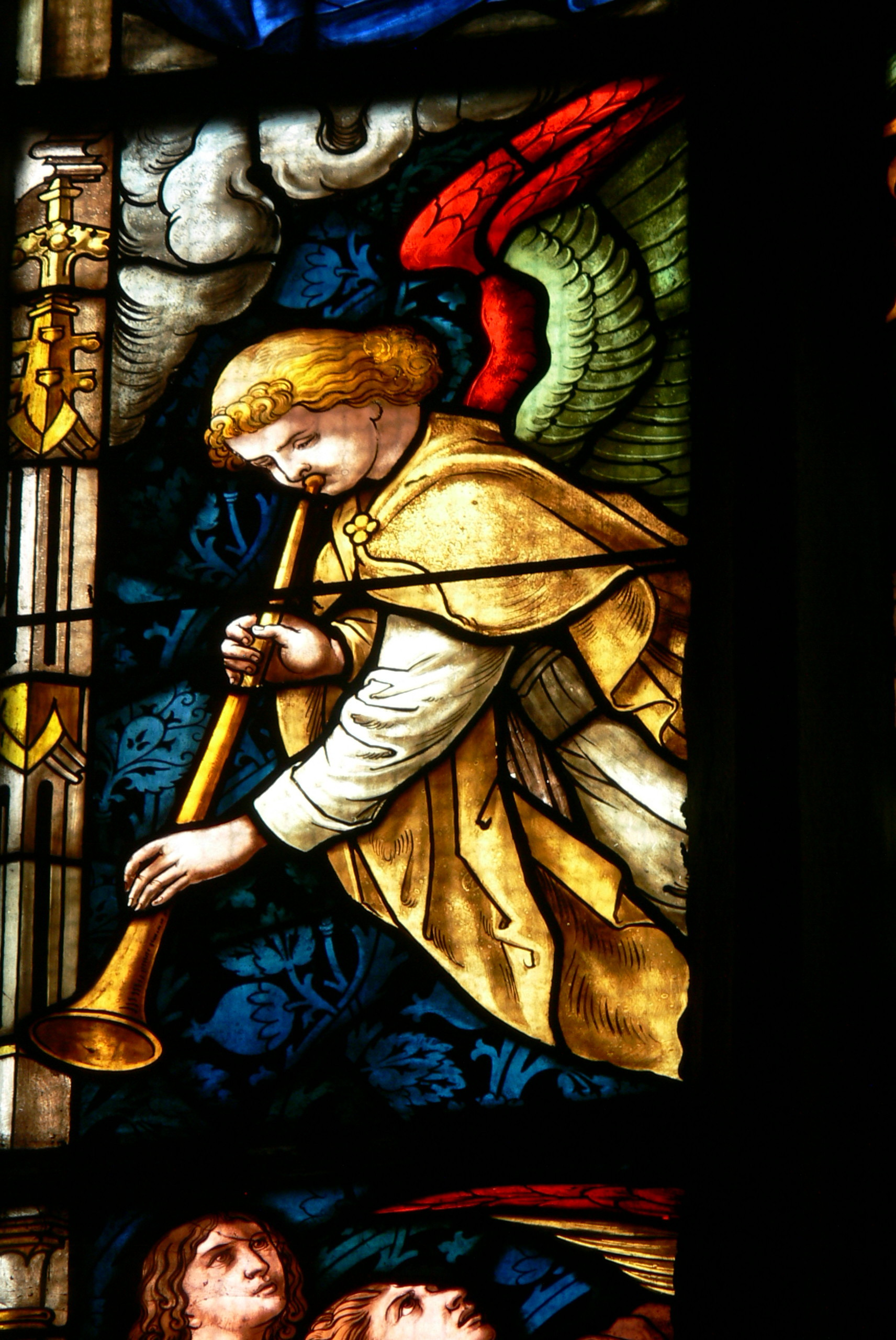
An angel blows the "last trumpet", as in 1 Corinthians 15:52, Langenzenn, Germany, 19th century

Interpretations of the term Kingdom of God have given rise to wide-ranging eschatological debates among scholars with diverging views, yet no consensus has emerged among scholars. From Augustine to the Reformation the arrival of the Kingdom had been identified with the formation of the Christian Church, but this view was later abandoned by some Christian Churches and by the beginning of the 20th century, some Protestant churches had adopted the apocalyptic interpretation of the Kingdom. In this view (also called the "consistent eschatology") the Kingdom of God did not start in the first century, but is a future apocalyptic event that is yet to take place.

By the middle of the 20th century, realized eschatology, which viewed the Kingdom as non-apocalyptic but as the manifestation of divine sovereignty over the world (realized by the ministry of Jesus), had gathered a scholarly following. In this view the Kingdom is held to be available in the present. The competing approach of inaugurated eschatology was later introduced as the "already and not yet" interpretation. In this view the Kingdom has already started, but awaits full disclosure at a future point. These diverging interpretations have since given rise to a good number of variants, with various scholars proposing new eschatological models that borrow elements from these.

== Denominational variations ==
Given no general agreement on the interpretation of the term Kingdom of God, significant diversity exists in the way Christian denominations interpret it and its associated eschatology. Over the centuries, as emerging Christian denominations introduced new concepts, their teachings and experiments with the linking of personalism with new notions of Christian community often involved new interpretations of the Kingdom of God in various socio-religious settings.

Thus the denominational attempt at incorporating the ideals expressed in the Acts of Apostles regarding the sharing of property within the Christian community came to interact with the social issues of the time to produce various interpretations regarding the establishment of the Kingdom of God on earth. Eschatological perspectives that emphasized the abandonment of the utopian visions of human achievement and the placement of hope in the work of God whose Kingdom were sought thus resulted in the linking of social and philanthropic issues to with the religious interpretations of the Kingdom of God in ways that produced distinct variations among denominations.

== See also ==
- Apocalypse
- Divine presence
- Emperor of Heaven
- Kingdom theology
- Queen of Heaven
- Our Father
