= Solomon Brück =

Austrian writer (??–c.1846)

Solomon ben Chaim Baruch Brück (Hebrew: שלמה בן חיים ברוך בריק, died c. 1846) was a Hebrew writer from Lemberg, Austria. He is the author of Ḥakirat ha-Emet (Altona, 1839), a volume of collectanea, including an English sermon which he delivered in England. His other work, Ḥezionei Layil, was published posthumously by his son. The work consists of a series of imaginary dream-visits to the other world, in which the manners and conduct of certain classes are severely criticized.
