= Donald Hagner =

American theologian (born 1936)

Donald Alfred Hagner is an American theologian, currently the George Eldon Ladd Professor Emeritus at Fuller Theological Seminary. He was born in 1936 in Chicago of a Polish mother and Swedish father and was educated at Northwestern University (BA), Fuller Theological Seminary (BD; ThM) and the University of Manchester, UK (PhD). He served in the US Navy from 1958-62.

== Biography ==
While at Northwestern, Hagner studied tuba under Arnold Jacobs and performed in the Chicago Symphony Orchestra under Fritz Reiner. He played professionally in Chicago for several years, followed by four years with the United States Navy Band in Washington, DC. In 1969 he joined the faculty at Wheaton College in Illinois, where he remained until accepting a post at Fuller Seminary in 1976. In 2014-15 he was Visiting Griset Chair in Bible and Christian Tradition at Chapman University in Orange, California. Dr. Hagner has presented lectures at various seminaries and universities on four continents.

In addition to many published articles and book reviews, his writings include Hebrews (New International Biblical Commentary); The Jewish Reclamation of Jesus; The Word Biblical Commentary on Matthew (2 vols.); Encountering the Book of Hebrews; New Testament Exegesis and Research: A Guide for Seminarians and The New Testament: A Historical and Theological Introduction (which received the Reference Book of the Year award from Academy of Parish Clergy in 2013). His most recent work is How New Is the New Testament? First-Century Judaism and the Emergence of Christianity.

As well as coediting several volumes, he has produced a new, revised edition of George Eldon Ladd’s A Theology of the New Testament, rewritten and updated Everett Harrison’s Romans (Expositor’s Bible Commentary), and served as coeditor of the New International Greek Testament Commentary. Dr. Hagner has been the recipient of the Weyerhauser Award for Excellence at Fuller Seminary and the 1996 ECPA Gold Medallion Award for Best Commentary (Matthew). In November, 2017, a Festschrift, Treasures New and Old: Essays in Honor of Donald A. Hagner, was presented to him at the Institute of Biblical Research plenary meeting in Boston, Massachusetts. Dr. Hagner is an ordained minister in the Presbyterian Church (USA). He currently resides in Altadena, California with his wife, Bev.

== Works ==
=== Books ===
- Hagner, Donald A. (1990). Hebrews. New International Biblical Commentary. Vol. 14. Peabody, MA: Hendrickson Publishers. ISBN 9780943575179. OCLC 21524972.
- ——— (1993). Matthew 1-13. Vol. 33a. Thomas Nelson. ISBN 978-0849902321.
- ——— (1995). Matthew 14-28. Vol. 33b. Thomas Nelson. ISBN 978-0849910968.
- ——— (2002). Encountering the Book of Hebrews: an exposition. Encountering biblical studies. Grand Rapids, MI: Baker Academic. ISBN 9780801025808. OCLC 48958389.

=== As editor ===
- ———; Evans, Craig A., eds. (1993). Anti-Semitism and Early Christianity: issues of polemic and faith. Minneapolis: Fortress Press. ISBN 9780800627485. OCLC 27147146.
- ———; Bockmuehl, Markus N. A., eds. (2005). The Written Gospel. Cambridge: Cambridge University Press. ISBN 9780511614729. OCLC 967413586.
