= Biblical theology =

Theology based on the study of the Bible as a whole

Because scholars have tended to use the term in different ways, biblical theology has been notoriously difficult to define. The academic field of biblical theology is sub-divided into Old Testament theology and New Testament theology.

== Academic field ==
Mark Bowald, writing for Grace Theological Seminary, stated that "four areas of focus" of theology "include biblical theology, historical theology, systematic (or dogmatic) theology, and practical theology".

Biblical theology is the study of the Bible's teachings as organic developments through biblical history, as an unfolding and gradual revelation, with increasing clarity and definition in the latter books, and embryonic and inchoate in form in the earlier books of the Bible. Although most speak of biblical theology as a particular method or emphasis within biblical studies, some scholars have also used the term in reference to its distinctive content. In this understanding, biblical theology is limited to a collation and restatement of biblical data, without the logical analysis and dialectical correlation between texts that systematic theology emphasizes.

Some scholars focus on the Old Testament (OT) or Hebrew Bible and falls in the field of Old Testament theology. The field started out as a Christian endeavor and aimed to provide an objective knowledge of early revelation, working as much as possible only with these biblical texts and their historical contexts, in the twentieth century it became informed by other voices and views, including those of feminist and Jewish scholars, which provided new insights and showed ways that the early work was bound by the perspectives of their authors. Key scholars have included Walther Eichrodt, Gerhard von Rad, Phyllis Trible, Geerhardus Vos, and Jon Levenson.

Others focus on the New Testament (NT); the field of New Testament theology likewise seeks understanding from within the bounds of these documents and their historical contexts. Key scholars have included Rudolf Bultmann, Hendrikus Boers, and N. T. Wright.

=== Evangelicalism ===
In Evangelicalism, biblical theology is a discipline of theology which emphasises the progressive nature of biblical revelation. Graeme Goldsworthy explains the relationship between biblical theology and systematic theology as follows:

Biblical theology, as defined here, is dynamic not static. That is, it follows the movement and process of God's revelation in the Bible. It is closely related to systematic theology (the two are dependent upon one another), but there is a difference in emphasis. Biblical theology is not concerned to state the final doctrines which go to make up the content of Christian belief, but rather to describe the process by which revelation unfolds and moves toward the goal which is God's final revelation of his purposes in Jesus Christ. Biblical theology seeks to understand the relationships between the various eras in God's revealing activity recorded in the Bible. The systematic theologian is mainly interested in the finished article - the statement of Christian doctrine. The biblical theologian on the other hand is concerned rather with the progressive unfolding of truth. It is on the basis of biblical theology that the systematic theologian draws upon the pre-Pentecost texts of the Bible as part of the material from which Christian doctrine may be formulated.

The work of Gregory Beale, Kevin Vanhoozer, Geerhardus Vos (Biblical Theology: Old and New Testaments), Herman Nicolaas Ridderbos (The Coming of the Kingdom), Meredith Kline (Kingdom Prologue), Graeme Goldsworthy (According to Plan, Gospel and Kingdom), Vaughan Roberts (God's Big Picture), James Hamilton (God's Glory in Salvation through Judgment), and Peter Gentry and Stephen Wellum (Kingdom through Covenant: A Biblical-Theological Understanding of the Covenants) have helped popularize this approach to the Bible. Especially important for bringing this field of study into the confessional tradition was Old Princeton theologian, Geerhardus Vos (Biblical Theology: Old and New Testaments). They summarize the message of the Bible as being about "God's people in God's place under God's rule and blessing" (in Graeme Goldsworthy, Gospel and Kingdom, Paternoster, 1981).

== History ==
In the 17th century, attempts to prove that Protestant dogmatic theology was based in the Bible were described as biblical theology. These early works explained biblical texts according to standard outlines used in systematic theology. In the 1770s, Johann Salomo Semler argued that biblical theology needed to be separated from dogmatic theology.

Johann Philipp Gabler's 1787 lecture "On the Proper Distinction Between Biblical and Dogmatic Theology" is considered the beginning of modern biblical theology. Gabler believed the Bible was "the one clear source from which all true knowledge of the Christian religion is drawn". For Gabler, dogmatic theology must be based on a biblical theology that is "pure and unmixed with foreign elements". Gabler identified two tasks for biblical theology. The first task was to provide an accurate historical description of the ideas found in the Bible. He argued that the interpretation of biblical texts needed to be informed by the language and customs of the relevant historical period. Significantly, Gabler did not assume that the Old Testament and New Testament possessed a uniformity in beliefs. Gabler's second task was to compare biblical ideas with each other to discover universal scriptural truths on which dogmatic theology could be based.

Taking up Gabler's first task, George Lorenz Bauer wrote separate biblical theologies for the OT (1796) and the NT (1800–1802). This marked the beginning of OT theology and NT theology as independent disciplines. However, Gabler's second task was forgotten. According to biblical scholar Frank Matera, "Instead of becoming a servant of dogmatic theology, biblical theology soon became its rival."

=== Biblical theology movement (1940s–1960s) ===
The biblical theology movement was an approach to Protestant biblical studies that was popular in the United States, particularly among Presbyterians, between the 1940s and early 1960s. Heavily influenced by Neo-orthodoxy, the movement sought to escape the polarization of liberal theology and Christian fundamentalism. Important themes included: "1) The Bible as a theological resource; 2) The unity of the Bible; 3) The revelation of God in history; 4) The Bible’s distinctly Hebraic mentality; and 5) The uniqueness of biblical revelation." Scholars included G. Ernest Wright, Floyd V. Filson, Otto Piper and James D. Smart.

== See also ==
- Christian views on the Old Covenant
- Covenant theology
