= Old Testament theology =

Branch of biblical theology

Old Testament theology is the branch of Biblical theology that seeks theological insight within the Old Testament or Hebrew Bible. It explores past and present theological concepts as they pertain to God and God's relationship with creation. While the field started out as a Christian endeavor written mostly by men and aimed to provide an objective knowledge of early revelation, in the twentieth century it became informed by other voices and views, including those of feminist and Jewish scholars, which provided new insights and showed ways that the early work was bound by the perspectives of their authors.

== History ==
The discipline of Old Testament (OT) theology is a rather recent development, barely going back further than the beginning of the nineteenth century. The very name "Old Testament" theology designates it as a particularly Christian enterprise; the conversation with Jewish scholars has been limited.

The earliest investigations of OT theology (OTT) started in recognition of the changing social, political, and religious conditions in which the various OT books were written. But a history-of-religions approach to OT theology soon met the obstacle of deciphering exactly when specific theological concepts developed and re-emerged.

It was not until 1787 that Johann Philipp Gabler made a distinction between dogmatic and biblical theology. Until then the OT was viewed in a systematic sense and only in relationship to New Testament (NT) understanding. Gabler began to study the OT in a critical sense looking at how the theology of ancient Israel would have been reflected in the OT books. This was a new way to look at the OT, as Robyn Routledge wrote in Old Testament Theology, “The OT was not written as a theological document, and a systematic approach necessarily involves imposing an alien order and structure on it.”

Walther Eichrodt wrote his two volume OTT, published in 1933. His approach was similar to Gabler’s in that they both looked for the historical context of the books, but differed by systematizing it. Eichrodt thought that the OT must be read in the way that the ancient Israelites would have, but there is one theme that acts as a “glue” that keeps all the theology together. The theme he saw was the Sinaitic Covenant. He saw other themes as well, but this was the core of the OT. He picked themes that, he thought, came up naturally in the OT, i.e. God and the people, God and the world.

When Gerhard von Rad his OTT in the 1960s, he rejected Eichrodt’s views on a systematic OTT and one central theme in the theology of the OT. He instead emphasized the dynamic nature of the Israelite faith. Von Rad argued that the events of the OT are based on historical events, but the final draft of the OT conveys the events which fit the needs of a new generation. He argued the OT recorded the Heilsgeschichte, a word he coined, which is the story of salvation viewed through the eyes of faithful Israelites.

In the 1970s Phyllis Trible pioneered a Christian feminist approach to OTT, using the approach of rhetorical criticism developed by her dissertation advisor, James Muilenburg.

In 1987 the Jewish biblical scholar Jon Levenson published an essay, Why Jews Are Not Interested in Biblical Theology, which challenged the findings and methods of the fields of biblical theology and historical criticism, which has subsequently been widely discussed. In the late 1990s his body of work as of that time was reviewed by Marvin A. Sweeney and put in the larger context of the field of biblical theology; Sweeney wrote: "A great deal of his work focuses on the seminal question of identifying the role that Christian theological constructs have played in the reading of biblical literature, even when the reading is presented as historically based objective scholarship, and of developing reading strategies that can remove these constructs in order to let the biblical texts 'speak for themselves.' Work of this kind naturally paves the way for the development of Jewish biblical theology."

== Approaches ==
Some theologians base their theology solely on observation of the presentation of God found in the sacred documents, a descriptive approach. Others try to establish the message of the text as a normative guide for the Christian church today, a prescriptive approach.

Typology is an approach to biblical interpretation in which an element within the Old Testament is perceived to suggest one found within the New Testament. The first is seen as the type and the completion is recognized as what Bernard Ramm described as the antitype. The type or antitype can be an event, person, or event; however, often the type is related to the messiah and often connected to the idea of salvation. "The use of Biblical typology enjoyed greater popularity in previous centuries, although even now it is by no means ignored as a hermeneutic".

John Goldingay's evangelical approach to OTT exhibits an interesting concept and has opened up new ways in which to examine the Old Testament and its relationship to Israel and the New Testament. This approach does not attempt to read Jesus into the OT through typology or any other artificial techniques. It does observe that the God of the OT exhibits grace persistently, undeterred by the lack of human obedience or response.

This evangelical approach insists that Jesus operated in the same way as the God who sent Abraham to a new land strictly out of love for him and the people he would guide into the Promised Land. Goldingay stated "The structure of Old Testament faith is itself that structure of the gospel - or rather, the structure of the gospel is the structure of Old Testament faith". It is the pattern of love in the Old Testament story which fuels the fire that continues in the Gospels. In order to have a true relational (covenant) connection there needs to be a true love relationship. A theological approach which depends entirely on historical facticity ignores the fact that the emphasis of the OT is on this relationship. Events occur and are remembered precisely because they depict elements of the relationship.

Whatever approach is used, interpreters must describe as well as possible what their methodologies and presuppositions are for carrying out their work. Then careful textual, linguistic, literary, historical, semantic, and philosophical exegesis must establish the basic foundational themes and aspects of any OT theology. Currently, a multifaceted and interdisciplinary approach is being developed. Anthropology, sociology, psychology, poetics, and linguistics offer helpful insights to mine the riches of these ancient revelation documents. Paul D. Hanson observed, "the rich diversity of traditions found in the Old Testament does not yield a chaotic theological picture, but one that is both dynamic and unified. The reason is that this approach goes beyond analysis of individual periods or traditions to grasp the overall development of biblical theology, by paying attention to all levels of tradition and all periods."

== Identity of God ==
YHWH (yod, he, vav, he), the name of the God of Israel, is called the tetragrammaton (= four letters). OT scholars believe that the name derives from the Hebrew verb “to be.” The name of God was revealed to Moses in the Old Testament book of Exodus 3:13-15. Through this passage, readers can see the personality of God revealed. Because the earliest writing in the Hebrew language did not utilize vowel marks and the Hebrew people revered God so much that they declined to pronounce the name aloud, the true pronunciation of the name of God has been lost due to a lack of use. Medieval Jewish scholars developed a system for inserting vowel marks into the consonantal text. Due to the tradition of reading aloud the word "adonai" (my Lord) whenever YHWH was encountered in the text, scribes inserted the vowel marks for "adonai" into the consonants Y-H-W-H. Centuries later, German translators of the Hebrew text transliterated the name of God as "Jehowah" and English translators followed the lead producing the word "Jehovah."

The OT presents YHWH as covenant maker and keeper. A covenant is a formal and binding agreement, under seal, between two or more parties, for the performance of some action. Those named in the covenant understand that it is not a trivial matter and the parties are expected to uphold the terms of the covenant. YHWH is portrayed throughout the OT as the initiator of covenants with people. Five main/major covenants give structure to the OT: Noahic, Abrahamic, Mosaic, Davidic, and the New Covenant (as prophesied by Jeremiah and Ezekiel). The first four of these covenants were specific covenants which YHWH made with individuals in a way that affected both them and the people to whom they belonged. Some of the applications of these covenants were specific to the individuals, while other aspects pertained to the nation of Israel and/or the world.

As the initiator of covenants, YHWH is depicted as providing all the necessary conditions for a covenant to occur. Moreover, YHWH is not only maker of the covenant; he is also the keeper of the covenant. His keeping of the covenant, specifically the unconditional covenant was not contingent upon the people keeping their end of the bargain. Even when the people break conditional covenants, YHWH executes a plan to bring them back into the covenant.

== See also ==
- New Testament theology

== Bibliography ==
- Barr, James (2009). The Concept of Biblical Theology: An Old Testament Perspective. Fortress Press. ISBN 9781451410259.
- Brueggemann, Walter (1997). Theology of the Old Testament : testimony, dispute, advocacy ([Nachdr.]. ed.). Minneapolis: Fortress Press. ISBN 978-0800630874.
- Goldingay, John. Approaches to Old Testament Interpretation.
- Levenson, Jon (1987). "Why Jews Are Not Interested in Biblical Theology". In Neusner, Jacob; Levine, Baruch A.; Frerichs, Ernest S.; McCracken-Flesher, Caroline (eds.). Judaic perspectives on ancient Israel. Philadelphia: Fortress Press. pp. 281–307. ISBN 978-0800608323.
- Ramm, Bernard (1970). Protestant Biblical Interpretation. Baker.
- Sweeney, Marvin A. (1997). "Why Jews Are Interested in Biblical Theology: A Retrospective on the Work of Jon D. Levenson". Jewish Book Annual. 55–56: 134–168. Archived from the original on 2018-11-20.
- Tull, Patricia K. (1999). "Chapter 8: Rhetorical Criticism and Intertextuality". In Haynes, Stephen R.; McKenzie, Steven L. (eds.). To each its own meaning : an introduction to biblical criticisms and their applications (Rev. and expanded. ed.). Louisville, Ky.: Westminster John Knox Press. ISBN 978-0664257842.
- Vater, Ann M. (1980). "Review of God and the Rhetoric of Sexuality". Journal of Biblical Literature. 99 (1): 131–133. doi:10.2307/3265712. JSTOR 3265712.
