= Johannes Weiss =

German theologian (1863–1914)

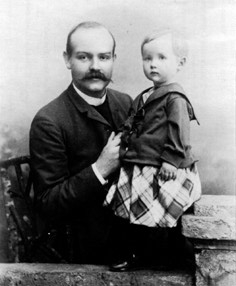
Johannes Weiss

Johannes Weiss (December 13, 1863 – August 24, 1914) was a German Protestant theologian and biblical exegete. He was a member of the history of religions school.

== History ==
Weiss was born in Kiel as son of Bernhard Weiss. A perpetual scholar, he studied in the University of Marburg, the University of Berlin, the University of Göttingen, and the University of Breslau. He then taught as a professor at Göttingen since 1890, at Marburg since 1895, and since 1908 at the University of Heidelberg. He wrote many influential books and papers, and was instrumental in the development of New Testament biblical criticism. He was held in the highest regard by his contemporaries, and subsequent scholarship has continued to recognize his wide influence.

Johannes Weiß died on 24 August 1914 in Heidelberg, at the age of 50. According to the Neue Deutsche Biographie, from May 1914 he was forced to abandon his teaching activity due to a cancerous illness, which led to his death a few months later. Various contemporary academic accounts describe his end as having occurred after extremely intense and prolonged suffering (nach unsäglichem Leiden), which confirms the severity of the process that preceded his death.

== Ideas ==
Weiss made the first exegesis of the Gospels from a perspective of consistent eschatology. According to Weiss, the "Kingdom of God" was Jesus' understanding of an imminent end to history, and all continuous ethical teachings were additions made by the early Church to make Jesus' teaching relevant when the end of the world did not come about immediately. This greatly influenced several generations of Biblical scholars. As a corollary, Weiss believed that the authentic teachings of the historical Jesus would be inapplicable to those who did not hold his first-century apocalyptic worldview.

Weiss also developed form criticism in its application to the New Testament, a theme expanded upon by Rudolf Bultmann and many other scholars. This tool enabled Weiss to conclude that I Corinthians is a collection of excerpts from letters by the Apostle Paul, and not a single letter in its own right.

Weiss is particularly notable for giving the name "Q" to the hypothetical sayings source used by the authors of the Gospel of Matthew and the Gospel of Luke. Many hold that Q stood for "Quelle", the German word for "source", but some recent scholarship indicates that the letter Q was chosen arbitrarily.

== Select works ==
- Die Predigt Jesu vom Reiche Gottes ("Jesus' Proclamation of the Kingdom of God"), 1892.
- Paulus und Jesus ("Paul and Jesus"), 1909.
- Jesus von Nazareth, Mythus oder Geschichte? ("Jesus of Nazareth, Myth or History?"), 1910.
- Das Urchristentum (completed by R. Knopf as "The History of Primitive Christianity"), 1917.
