= George Eldon Ladd =

Canadian-born minister and scholar (1911–1982)

- Born: July 31, 1911; Alberta, Canada
- Died: October 5, 1982 (aged 71); Pasadena, California
- Occupations: Erstwhile professor of New Testament theology and exegesis at Fuller Theological Seminary
- Known for: Inaugurated eschatology and "futuristic post-tribulationism."

Academic background
- Education: Gordon College, Gordon Divinity School,
- Alma mater: Harvard University (Ph.D.)

Academic work
- Discipline: Biblical studies
- Sub-discipline: New Testament exegesis and theology
- Institutions: Gordon College of Theology and Missions; Harvard University; Fuller Theological Seminary
- Notable works: The Presence of the Future, A Theology of the New Testament, A Commentary on the Revelation of John (NICNT)
- Notable ideas: Inaugurated eschatology
- Influenced: Evangelical eschatology

George Eldon Ladd (July 31, 1911 – October 5, 1982) was a Baptist minister and professor of New Testament theology and exegesis at Fuller Theological Seminary in Pasadena, California, known in Christian eschatology for his promotion of inaugurated eschatology and "futuristic post-tribulationism."

== Biography ==
Ladd was born in Alberta, Canada, and was raised in New England. He studied theology at Gordon College in Massachusetts, and was ordained in 1933 in the Northern Baptist Convention. He pastored churches in New Hampshire and Vermont while pursuing further education at Gordon Divinity School. Ladd served as an instructor at Gordon College of Theology and Missions (now Gordon-Conwell Theological Seminary), Wenham, Massachusetts from 1942 to 1945. He was an associate professor of New Testament and Greek from 1946 to 1950, and head of the department of New Testament from 1946 to 1949. He studied at Harvard University during this period, completing a PhD dissertation on "The Eschatology of the Didache".

Ladd moved to California in 1950, and taught biblical theology at Fuller Theological Seminary, Pasadena. Fuller was in the fourth year of its existence when Ladd joined the faculty, and Hagner notes that he "became one of the key figures in developing the seminary's direction."

== Notable contributions to evangelical theology ==
=== New Testament theology ===
Ladd's best-known work, A Theology of the New Testament, has been used by thousands of seminary students since its publication in 1974. In a poll conducted by Mark Noll in 1986, this work ranked as the second most influential book among evangelical scholars, second only to Calvin's Institutes. A Theology of the New Testament was enhanced and updated by Donald A. Hagner in 1993. Ladd's belief in both present and future aspects of the Kingdom of God caused his detractors to critically compare his eschatological views to the amillennialism that was popular within Reformed theological circles. Despite these comparisons, Ladd was not Reformed, and in fact rejected the Calvinistic view of the doctrine of salvation.

=== Inaugurated and premillennial eschatology ===
Ladd was a notable modern proponent of historic premillennialism and often criticized dispensationalist views. This was notable during this period, as dispensationalism was by far the most widely held view among evangelicals during the mid-twentieth century. His writings regarding the Kingdom of God (especially his view of inaugurated eschatology) have become a cornerstone of Kingdom theology. His perspective is expressed in R. G. Clouse, ed., 1977, The Meaning of the Millennium: Four Views (Downers Grove: InterVarsity Press) and the shorter and more accessible The Gospel of the Kingdom (Paternoster, 1959).

=== Recognition ===
John Piper uses Ladd's desire for scholarly credibility as a cautionary tale, and relates how Ladd "was almost undone emotionally and professionally" by Norman Perrin's critical review of Ladd's Jesus and the Kingdom. Piper goes on to describe how Ladd walked through the halls of Fuller shouting and waving a royalty check when A Theology of the New Testament was a stunning success ten years later.

In 1978, a Festschrift was published in his honour. Unity and Diversity in New Testament Theology: Essays in Honor of George E. Ladd (ISBN 0-80283504-X), which included contributions by Leon Morris, William Barclay, F. F. Bruce, I. Howard Marshall, Richard Longenecker and Daniel Fuller.

== Selected works ==
=== Books ===
- Ladd, George Eldon (1952). Crucial Questions About the Kingdom. Grand Rapids, MI: Eerdmans. ISBN 9780802815712.
- Ladd, George Eldon (1956). The Blessed Hope. Grand Rapids, MI: Eerdmans. ISBN 9780802811110. OCLC 6672580.
- ——— (1959). The Gospel of the Kingdom: scriptural studies in the kingdom of God. Grand Rapids, MI: Eerdmans. ISBN 9780802812803. OCLC 1233100.
- ——— (1964). Jesus and the Kingdom: the eschatology of Biblical realism. New York: Harper & Row. OCLC 1219175.
- ——— (1964). Rudolf Bultmann. IVP series in contemporary Christian thought. Vol. 7. Chicago, IL: Inter-Varsity Press. OCLC 4799561.
- ——— (1967). The New Testament and Criticism. Grand Rapids, MI: Eerdmans. ISBN 9780802831606. OCLC 383103.
- ——— (1972). A Commentary on the Revelation of John. Grand Rapids, MI: Eerdmans. ISBN 9780802816849. OCLC 257115.
- ——— (1973). The Presence of the Future: the eschatology of Biblical realism. Grand Rapids, MI: Eerdmans. ISBN 9780802815316. OCLC 974064911. - original issued as Jesus and the Kingdom
- ——— (1974). A Theology of the New Testament (1st general ed.). Grand Rapids, MI: Eerdmans. ISBN 9780802834430. OCLC 803712. - originally published in small numbers in 1957
- ——— (1975). I Believe in the Resurrection of Jesus. Vol. 2. Grand Rapids, MI: Eerdmans. ISBN 9780802816115. OCLC 1341576.
- ——— (1978). The Last Things: An Eschatology For Laymen. Grand Rapids, MI: Eerdmans. ISBN 9780802817273. OCLC 3345471.
- ——— (1993). Hagner, Donald A. (ed.). A Theology of the New Testament (2nd revised ed.). Grand Rapids, MI: Eerdmans. ISBN 9780802806802. OCLC 850881255.

=== Articles and chapters ===
- ——— (Jan 1952). "The Kingdom of God in the Jewish Apocryphal Literature: Part 1". Bibliotheca Sacra. 109: 55–62.
- ——— (Apr 1952). "The Kingdom of God in the Jewish Apocryphal Literature: Part 2". Bibliotheca Sacra. 109: 164–74.
- ——— (Oct 1952). "The Kingdom of God in the Jewish Apocryphal Literature: Part 3". Bibliotheca Sacra. 109: 318–31.
- ——— (Jan 1952). "The Kingdom of God in 1 Enoch". Bibliotheca Sacra. 11: 32–49.
- ——— (1957). "The Revelation and Jewish Apocalyptic". The Evangelical Quarterly. 29 (2): 94–100.
