= Bernhard Weiss =

German biblical scholar (1827–1918)

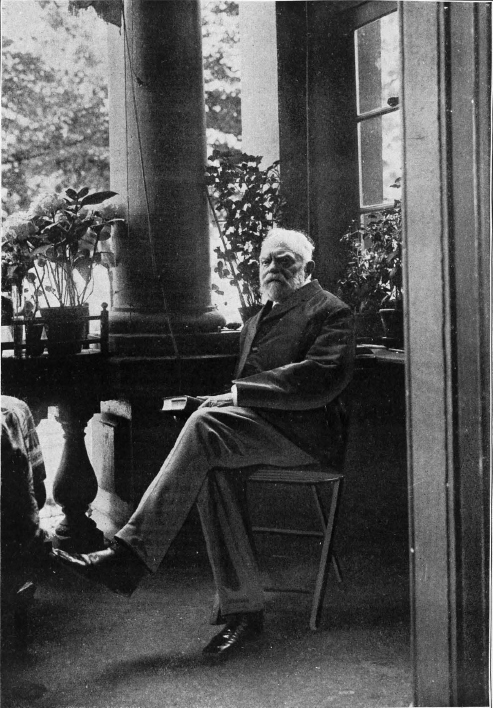
- Born: June 20, 1827; Königsberg
- Died: January 14, 1918 (aged 90)
- Education: University of Königsberg, University of Halle, University of Berlin
- Occupations: Professor of Theology, New Testament Scholar, Consistorial Councillor
- Years active: 19th–20th century
- Children: Johannes Weiss, Hedwig Weiss
- Theological work
- Tradition or movement: Protestant
- Main interests: New Testament scholarship, Biblical Theology, Textual Criticism

Bernhard Weiss (20 June 1827 – 14 January 1918) was a German Protestant New Testament scholar. He was the father of Johannes Weiss and the painter, Hedwig Weiss.

== Biography ==
Weiss was born at Königsberg. After studying theology at the University of Königsberg (Albertina), Halle and Berlin, he became professor extraordinarius at Königsberg in 1852, and afterwards professor ordinarius at Kiel and Berlin. In 1880 he was made superior consistorial councillor of the Evangelical State Church of Prussia's older Provinces.

== Literary production ==
An opponent of the Tübingen School, he published a number of important works, which became well known to students in Great Britain and America. He was also the reviser of commentaries on the New Testament in the series of H.A.W. Meyer: he wrote the commentaries on Matthew (the 9th ed., 1897), Mark and Luke (the 9th ed., 1901), John (the 9th ed., 1902), Romans (the 9th ed., 1899), the Epistles to Timothy and Titus (the 7th ed., 1902), Hebrews (the 6th ed., 1897), and the Epistles of John (the 6th ed., 1900).

Weiss also established a new text of the Greek New Testament, which was utilized by Eberhard Nestle for his Novum Testamentum Graece.

His other works include:

- Lehrbuch der biblischen Theologie des Neuen Testaments (1868, 9th ed., 1903; Eng. trans., 1883)
- Des Leben Jesu (1882, 4th ed. 1902; Eng. trans., 1883)
- Lehrbuch der Einleitung in des Neue Testament (1886; 3rd ed., 1897; Eng. trans. 1888)
- Das Neue Testament: Berichtigter Text (3 vols, 1902)
- Die Quellen des Lukasevangeliums (1907)
