= Idealism (Christian eschatology) =

Interpretation of the Christian Book of Revelation that sees it as symbolic

In the context of Christian eschatology, idealism (also called the spiritual approach, the allegorical approach, the nonliteral approach, and many other names) involves an interpretation of the Book of Revelation that sees all or most of the imagery of the book as symbolic.

== Supporters ==
Idealism is common among Reformed theologians and it is associated with amillennialism. There exists degrees of Idealism, the most radical form sees it as entirely symbolic, while a more moderate view may allow for some historical fulfillment of events. Idealism was common in medieval writers and is still taught by some modern theologians.

F. D. Maurice (1805–1872) interpreted the Kingdom of Heaven idealistically as a symbol representing society's general improvement, instead of as a physical and political kingdom. Karl Barth (1886–1968) interpreted eschatology as representing existential truths that bring the individual hope, rather than as history or as future-history. Barth's ideas provided fuel for the Social Gospel philosophy in America, which saw social change not as performing "required" good works, but because the individuals involved felt that Christians could not simply ignore society's problems with future dreams.

== Views on the Beast ==
Different authors have suggested that the Beast of Revelation represents various social injustices, such as exploitation of workers, wealth, the elite, commerce, materialism, and imperialism. Various Christian anarchists, such as Jacques Ellul (1912–1994), have identified the State and political power as the Beast.

== Prophecy ==
Christian eschatological idealism is distinct from Preterism, Futurism and Historicism in that it does not see any of the prophecies (except in some cases the Second Coming, and Final Judgment) as being fulfilled in a literal, physical, earthly sense in the past, present or future. It views interpretation of the eschatological portions of the Bible in a historical or future-historical fashion as an erroneous understanding.

== See also ==
- Inaugurated eschatology
- Postmillennialism
- Realized eschatology
