= Oscar Cullmann =

French theologian (1902-1999)

- Born: 25 February 1902; Strasbourg
- Died: 16 January 1999 (aged 96); Chamonix
- Known for: Christian theologian

Academic background
- Education: Strasbourg seminary

Academic work
- Discipline: Christian eschatology and Christology
- Institutions: Basel Reformed Seminary, Sorbonne - Paris
- Influenced: John Howard Yoder

Oscar Cullmann (25 February 1902, Strasbourg – 16 January 1999, Chamonix) was a French Lutheran theologian. He is best known for his work in the ecumenical movement and was partly responsible for the establishment of dialogue between the Lutheran and Catholic traditions. Because of his intense ecumenical work, Cullmann's Basel colleague Karl Barth joked with him that his tombstone would bear the inscription "advisor to three popes".

== Biography ==
Cullmann was born in Strasbourg (then in Germany) and studied classical philology and theology at the seminary there. In 1926, he accepted an assistant professorship, a position previously held by Albert Schweitzer.

In 1930, he was awarded a full professorship of New Testament. From 1936, he also taught the history of the early church. In 1938, he began teaching both subjects at the University of Basel. In 1948 Cullmann accepted a position teaching theology in Paris at the Sorbonne while he continued at Basel. He retired from both in 1972.

He was elected a foreign member of the Royal Netherlands Academy of Arts and Sciences in 1960. He was also invited to be an observer at the Second Vatican Council. Because of his intense ecumenical work, Cullmann's Basel colleague Karl Barth joked with him that his tombstone would bear the inscription "advisor to three popes".

Upon his death at 96, the World Council of Churches issued a special tribute to Cullmann to honour his ecumenical work.

== Theology ==
Cullmann's studies on Christian eschatology and Christology drove him to propose a third position over against the popular positions of C. H. Dodd and Albert Schweitzer, known as "redemptive history" or "inaugurated eschatology". His Christology is described as 'event' rather than the doctrine of natures. He wrote that Jesus Christ was the midpoint of sacred history, which informs general history and runs linearly from creation to consummation. He stressed the objective reality of sacred history against the existentialist interpretation of Rudolf Bultmann, a fellow German theologian. Cullmann suggested the analogy of D-Day and VE-Day to illustrate the relationship between Jesus' death and resurrection on the one hand, and his parousia on the other.

== Selected works ==
Among Cullmann's important works are:

- Cullmann, Oscar (1950). Baptism in the New Testament (trans. of Die Tauflehre des Neuen Testaments: Erwachsenen- und Kindertaufe). Studies in Biblical Theology. Vol. 1. London: SCM Press. ISBN 9780334000686. OCLC 13521948. - (trans from the Zürich: Zwingli-Verlag, 1948 1st edition).
- ——— (1951). Christ and Time: the primitive Christian conception of time and history (trans. of Christus und die Zeit: die urchristliche Zeit- und Geschichtsauffassung. London: SCM Press. OCLC 603792847. - (trans from the Zollikon-Zürich: Evangelischer Verlag a. g., 1946 1st edition).
- ——— (1953). Early Christian Worship (trans. for Urchristentum und Gottesdienst). Studies in Biblical Theology. Vol. 10. London: SCM Press. ISBN 9780334003533. OCLC 391942. - (trans from the Basel & Zürich, 1944 1st edition).
- ——— (1953). Petrus, Jünger, Apostel, Martyrer: das historische und das theologische Petrus-problem [Peter: Disciple, Apostle and Martyr]. London: SCM Press. OCLC 603801281. - (trans from the Zürich : Zwingli, 1952 1st edition).
- ——— (1958). Immortality of the Soul; or, Resurrection of the dead?: the witness of the New Testament. Ingersoll Lecture, 1955. London: Epworth. OCLC 9538428.
- ——— (1959). The Christology of the New Testament (trans. of Die Christologie des Neuen Testaments). London: SCM Press. OCLC 301386195. - (trans from the Kampen: Kok, 1911 1st edition).
- ——— (1965). Salvation in History (trans. of Heil als Geschichte: heilsgeschichtliche Existenz im Neuen Testament. New Testament Library. London: SCM Press. ISBN 9780334015598. OCLC 17518219. - (trans from the Tübingen: J.C.B. Mohr (Paul Siebeck), 1965 1st edition).
