= Inaugurated eschatology =

Kingdom of God as both now and not yet

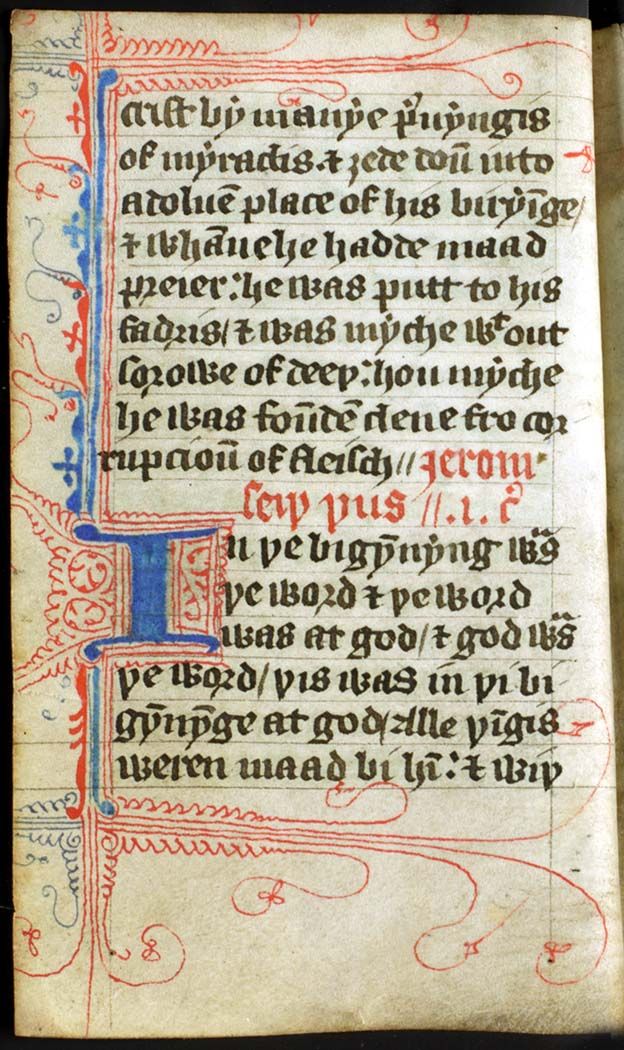
A 14th century, pocket sized copy of the Gospel of John

Inaugurated eschatology is the belief in Christian theology that the kingdom of God was initiated with the first incarnation of Jesus, and thus there are both "already" and "not yet" aspects to the kingdom. George Eldon Ladd suggests that the kingdom of God is "not only an eschatological gift belonging to the Age to Come; it is also a gift to be received in the old aeon."

This approach was first developed by Geerhardus Vos, especially in his 1930 work, The Pauline Eschatology. Later, Oscar Cullmann sought to combine the "thorough-going eschatology" of Albert Schweitzer with the "realized eschatology" of C. H. Dodd. Cullmann suggested the analogy of D Day and V Day to illustrate the relationship between Jesus's death and resurrection on the one hand, and his Second Coming on the other.

Inaugurated eschatology was popularized by Ladd, especially among American evangelicals. Stephen Um notes that as evangelicals "began to explore the meaning of inaugurated eschatology for evangelical theology, they were almost always either explicitly or implicitly in conversation with Ladd's work."

D. A. Carson sees John 5:24 ("whoever hears my word and believes him who sent me has eternal life and will not be condemned; he has crossed over from death to life", NIV) as giving the "strongest affirmation of inaugurated eschatology in the Fourth Gospel": it is not necessary for the believer to "wait until the last day to experience something of resurrection life."

Some view Inaugurated Eschatology as a kingdom theology that goes against a literal reading of kingdom passages in the New Testament. They point to passages such as Acts 1:6 where the Apostles are seen awaiting the restoration of the kingdom to Israel immediately prior to the ascension of Jesus as demonstrating that the kingdom has not been established in any way. George N. H. Peters writes extensively on the future-kingdom approach in his three-volume The Theocratic Kingdom. Alternatively, this could be interpreted as the Apostles awaiting for the earthly establishment of Jesus's kingdom in its full glory.

== See also ==
- Idealism (Christian eschatology)
- Kingdom theology
- World to Come
- realized eschatology
- consistent eschatology
