= Realized eschatology =

Concept in Christian eschatology

Realized eschatology is a Christian eschatological theory popularised by J.A.T. Robinson (1919-1983), Joachim Jeremias (1900-1979), Ethelbert Stauffer (1902–1979), and C. H. Dodd (1884–1973) that holds that the eschatological passages in the New Testament do not refer to the future, but instead refer to the ministry of Jesus and to his lasting legacy. (Note: In this respect realized eschatology can represent a variety of full preterism.) Eschatology is therefore not the end of the world but its rebirth instituted by Jesus and continued by his disciples, a historical (rather than transhistorical) phenomenon. Those holding this view generally dismiss eschatological theories as irrelevant; they hold that what Jesus said and did, and told his disciples to do likewise, are of greater significance than any messianic expectations. Realized eschatology contrasts with consistent eschatology. The two concepts have been combined in inaugurated eschatology.

== Criticism ==
Theologian John Walvoord (1910-2002) asserts that realized eschatology attracts liberal Christians who prefer to emphasize the love and goodness of God while rejecting the notion of judgment. On the other hand, theology professor David Wheeler suggests that eschatology should be about being engaged in the process of becoming, rather than waiting for external and unknown forces to bring about destruction.

== See also ==
- Christian perfection
- Idealism (Christian eschatology)
- Immanentize the eschaton
- Jesuism
- Postmillennialism
- Preterism
- Tikkun olam
- World to Come
- Consistent eschatology
- Christian eschatology
- Kingdom theology
- Inaugurated eschatology
