= Kingdom theology =

Christian theological movement

Kingdom theology is a system of Christian thought that elaborates on inaugurated eschatology, which is a way of understanding the various teachings on the kingdom of God found throughout the New Testament. Its emphasis is that the purpose of both individual Christians and the church as a whole is to manifest the kingdom of God on the earth, incorporating personal evangelism, social action, and foreign missions.

== Theology ==
Kingdom theology distinguishes between the current world ruled by Satan, the one we live in, and the world ruled by God, his kingdom. Kingdom theology holds the importance of the kingdom of God as a core value and teaches that the kingdom currently exists in the world, but not yet in its fullness. The theology maintains that the kingdom of God will come in fullness with Christ's second coming. In the future fulfilment, evil and Satan will be destroyed and God's complete rule on Earth established. Theologian and director of the Vineyard Bible Institute Derek Morphew argued that the kingdom of God encompassed both signs and wonders and social justice. Although kingdom theology presents history as a struggle between God and Satan, there is an eschatological expectation that God will triumph over Satan, which is why suffering for the sake of the kingdom is accepted.

In more Charismatic circles, kingdom theology attempts to be able to explain both spiritual victory and continued spiritual warfare, and why some people are seen to be healed by the Holy Spirit and some are not. These kingdom theologians have argued that, because of this, a tension will exist between the apparent successes and failures of prayer. Theologian Don Williams argued that to pray means to ask the future kingdom to break into the present world, rather than being to call down perfection from heaven. Kingdom theology proposes values based on the spiritual world, often different from what Harold Bender and Robert Friedman term the "secular values" of Jesus, such as when Jesus urges his listeners, "Love your enemies and pray for those who persecute you, so that you may be sons of your Father who is in heaven, For he makes his sun rise on the evil and on the good, and sends rain on the just and on the unjust" (Mt. 5:44-45) in the Sermon on the Mount.

=== Eschatology ===
George Eldon Ladd believed that the Bible taught of two ages: 'This Age' and 'The Age to Come'. In 'This Age', there will be hostility to Christianity but in the 'Age to Come' those who have followed Jesus will be free from oppression and given eternal life. He believed that 'The Age to Come' would be inaugurated by the second coming of Jesus and the resurrection of the dead. Ladd argued that there is an overlap between the two ages; he suggested that, although the 'Age to Come' is in the future, it can still be "tasted" now, and its power can penetrate 'This Age'. The Vineyard movement's statement of faith relating to the last book of the bible, Revelation, states that God's kingdom came through Jesus and continues to come through the Holy Spirit. It suggests that, when Jesus comes again, Satan will be defeated, the dead will be raised, the final judgement will happen, and God's kingdom will be fully established.

== History and influence ==
This theological concept of "already" and "not yet" was proposed by Princeton theologian Gerhardus Vos early in the 20th century, who believed that we live in the present age, the 'now', and await the 'age to come'. Kingdom theology was more fully examined in the 1950s by George Eldon Ladd, then a professor of biblical theology at Fuller Theological Seminary. He argued that there are two true meanings to the kingdom of God: Firstly, he proposed that the kingdom of God is God's authority and right to rule. Secondly, he argued that it also refers to the realm in which God exercises his authority, which is described in scripture both as a kingdom that is presently entered into and as one which will be entered in the future. He concluded that the kingdom of God is both present and future.

Doctrine of the kingdom of God caused controversy with Protestantism, regarding whether Christians should work to achieve the coming of the kingdom, or whether it is a divine gift from God. The evangelical movement regarded the extension of the kingdom of God as achieved through evangelism and missionary work. The philosophers Immanuel Kant, Friedrich Schleiermacher and Albrecht Ritschl believed that the kingdom of God referred to a world of ideal human relations and envisaged a perfect Christian society. This interpretation influenced the secularisation of the doctrine and the development of liberal theology in the 1930s, and the Social Gospel movement in the US.

John Wimber, the founder of the Vineyard movement, taught a particular application of kingdom theology, emphasizing signs and wonders as the coming of the kingdom of God, as well as Gordon Fee. The theology has been influential among the more Charismatic elements of evangelical Christianity, for whom it provides a theological framework for believing in the present-day activity of the Holy Spirit. It is officially embraced by the Vineyard Churches, and underpins many of its teachings.

== See also ==
- Two kingdoms doctrine

== Sources and further reading ==
- Joseph Alexander (2018) Christocracy: Christ Kingdom Governance on Earth by True Followers
- Bielo, James (2011). Emerging Evangelicals: Faith, Modernity, and the Desire for Authenticity. NYU Press. ISBN 978-0-8147-8955-1.
- Bowden, John; Richardson, Alan (1983). The Westminster Dictionary of Christian Theology. Westminster John Knox Press. ISBN 978-0-6642-2748-7.
- John Bright (1980), The Kingdom of God
- Enns, Peter (2011). Ecclesiastes. Wm. B. Eerdmans. ISBN 978-0-8028-6649-3.
- Friedmann, Robert (2010). Bender, Harold (ed.). Hutterite Studies. H. B. Book Centre. ISBN 978-0-9865381-0-0.
- Georg Kühlewind, Le Royaume de Dieu
- Ladd, George Eldon (1959). The Gospel of the Kingdom: Scriptural Studies in the Kingdom of God. Wm. B. Eerdmans. ISBN 978-0-8028-1280-3.
- Ladd, George Eldon (1993). A Theology of the New Testament. Wm. B. Eerdmans. ISBN 978-0-8028-0680-2.
- Morphew, Derek (2007). Breakthrough: Discovering the Kingdom. Vineyard International Publishing. ISBN 978-0-6202-3469-6.
- Beno Profetyk (2017) Christocrate, la logique de l'anarchisme chrétien
- Beno Profetyk (2020) Credo du Christocrate – Christocrat's creed (French-English ed.)
- Patrick Schreiner (2018), The Kingdom of God and the Glory of the Cross
- Leo Tolstoy (1886–94) The Kingdom of God Is Within You
- "Statement of Faith". About. Vineyard USA.
