= Kingship and kingdom of God =

Concept in Abrahamic religions

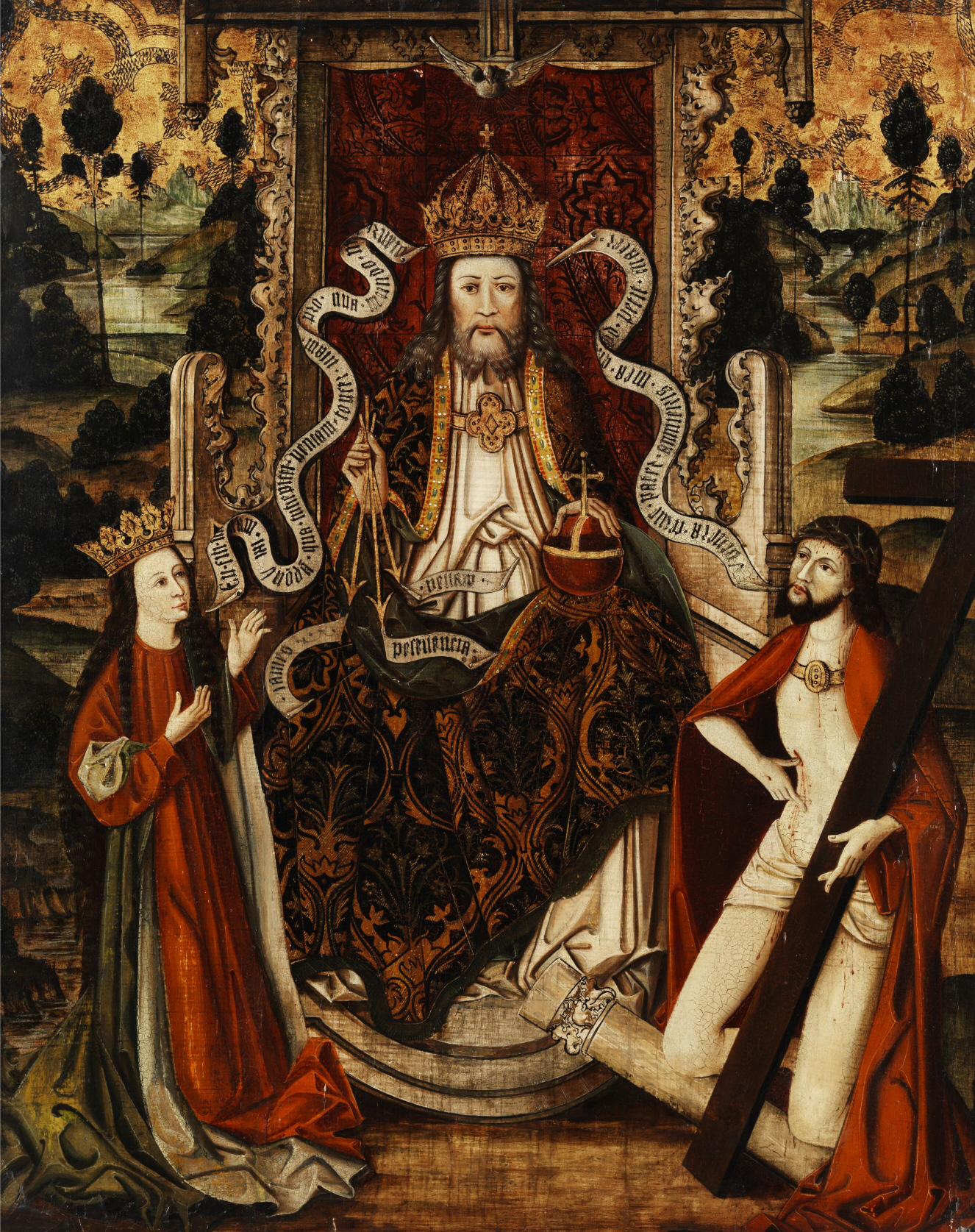
God the Father on a throne, Westphalia, Germany, late 15th century

The concept of the kingship of God appears in all Abrahamic religions, where in some cases the terms kingdom of God and kingdom of Heaven are also used. The notion of God's kingship finds its roots in the Hebrew Bible, where "his kingdom" is referenced, though the exact term "Kingdom of God" is not used.

The "Kingdom of God" and its equivalent form "Kingdom of Heaven" in the Gospel of Matthew is one of the key elements of the teachings of Jesus in the New Testament. The Gospel of Mark indicates that the gospel is the good news about the Kingdom of God. The term pertains to the kingship of Christ over all creation. The phrase "Kingdom of heaven" appears in Matthew's gospel due primarily to Jewish sensibilities about uttering the "name" (God). Jesus did not teach the kingdom of God per se so much as the return of that kingdom. The notion of God's kingdom (as it had been under Moses) returning became an agitation in Roman Palestine 60 years before Jesus was born, and continued to be a force for nearly a hundred years after his death. Drawing on Old Testament teachings, the Christian characterization of the relationship between God and humanity inherently involves the notion of the "Kingship of God".

The Quran does not use the term "kingdom of God", but includes the Throne Verse which talks about the throne of God encompassing the heavens and the Earth. The Quran also refers to Abraham seeing the "Kingdom of the heavens". Writings of the Baháʼí Faith also use the term "kingdom of God".

== Zoroastrianism ==
Zoroastrianism, a possible influence on Abrahamic traditions, includes the concept of a "kingdom of God" or of a divine kingship:

In the Gāthās Zoroaster's thoughts about khšathra as a thing turn mostly to the 'dominion' or 'kingdom' of God, which was conceived, it seems, both as heaven itself, thought of as lying just above the visible sky, and as the kingdom of God to come on earth which is also represented by Khšathra - hence, presumably, his standing epithet of vairya 'desirable'; for as Christians pray to God, 'Thy kingdom come ...', so also Zoroastrians long to establish the kingdom of Ahura Mazdā here below. [...] The heavenly aspect of khšathra/Khšathra has plainly a pagan origin, for in the Vedas Paradise is the kṣatra of Varuṇa, the kingdom of heaven which for their own happiness men longed to attain.

== Hebrew Bible ==
The term "kingdom of the LORD" appears twice in the Hebrew Bible, in 1 Chronicles 28:5 and 2 Chronicles 13:8. In addition, "his kingdom" and "your kingdom" are sometimes used when referring to God. "Yours is the kingdom, O Lord" is used in 1 Chronicles 29:10–12 and "His kingdom is an everlasting kingdom" in Daniel 3:33 (Daniel 4:3 in the verse numbering used in Christian Bibles) for example. There are also verses like Exodus 19:6 that show how Israel, as God's chosen people, are considered to be a kingdom, mirroring some Christian interpretations that view God's kingdom as Christendom.

"The Hebrew word malkuth [...] refers first to a reign, dominion, or rule and only secondarily to the realm over which a reign is exercised. [...] When malkuth is used of God, it almost always refers to his authority or to his rule as the heavenly King." The "enthronement psalms" (Psalms 45, 93, 96, 97–99) provide a background for this view with the exclamation "The Lord is King".

1 Kings 22:19, Isaiah 6, Ezekiel 1 and Daniel 7:9 all speak of the Throne of God, although some philosophers such as Saadia Gaon and Maimonides interpreted such mention of a "throne" as allegory.

== Intertestamental period ==
The phrase the Kingdom of God is not common in intertestamental literature. Where it does occur, such as in the Psalms of Solomon and the Wisdom of Solomon, it usually refers to "God's reign, not to the realm over which he reigns, nor to the new age, [nor to ...] the messianic order to be established by the Lord's Anointed".

The term does occasionally, however, denote "an eschatological event", such as in the Assumption of Moses and the Sibylline Oracles. In these works, "God's Kingdom is not the new age but the effective manifestation of his rule in all the world so that the eschatological order is established." Along these lines was the more "national" view in which the awaited messiah was seen as a liberator and the founder of a new state of Israel.

== New Testament ==
The Gospel of Luke records Jesus' description of the Kingdom of God, "The kingdom of God does not come with observation; neither shall they say, Lo here! or, lo there! for, behold, the kingdom of God is within you."

In the Synoptic Gospels, Jesus speaks frequently of God's kingdom. However within the New Testament, nowhere does Jesus appear to clearly define the concept. Within the Synoptic Gospel accounts, the assumption appears to have been made that, "this was a concept so familiar that it did not require definition." Karen Wenell wrote, "Mark's Gospel provides for us a significant place of transformation for the space of the Kingdom of God, precisely because it can be understood as a kind of birthplace for the Kingdom of God, the beginning of its construction ...".

John's Gospel refers to the Kingdom of God in Jesus' dialogue with Nicodemus in chapter 3. Constantin von Tischendorf's text is exceptional in referring to "the kingdom of heaven" in John 3:5, on evidence which Heinrich Meyer describes as "ancient but yet inadequate".

Within the non-canonical, yet contemporary Gnostic Gospel of Thomas, Jesus is quoted as saying, "If those who lead you say to you: ‘Look, the kingdom is in the sky!’ then the birds of the sky will precede you. If they say to you: ‘It is in the sea,’ then the fishes will precede you. Rather, the kingdom is inside of you and outside of you. When you come to know yourselves, then you will be known, and you will realize that you are the children of the living Father." This same Gospel of Thomas further describes Jesus as implying that the Kingdom of God is already present, saying, "The kingdom of the Father is spread out upon the earth, and people do not see it."

The Apostle Paul described the Kingdom of God in his letter to the church in Rome: "For the kingdom of God is not a matter of eating and drinking, but of righteousness, peace and joy in the Holy Spirit."

The Kingdom of God (and its possibly equivalent form Kingdom of Heaven in the Gospel of Matthew) is one of the key elements of the teachings of Jesus in the New Testament. Drawing on Old Testament teachings, the Christian characterization of the relationship between God and humanity inherently involves the notion of the "Kingship of God".

Most of the uses of the Greek word, basileia (kingdom), in the New Testament involve the Kingdom of God (or Kingdom of Heaven). Matthew is likely to have instead used the term heaven because the background of his Jewish audience imposed restrictions on the frequent use of the name of God. However, Dr. Chuck Missler asserts that Matthew intentionally differentiated between the kingdoms of God and Heaven: "Most commentators presume that these terms are synonymous. However, Matthew uses Kingdom of Heaven 33 times, but also uses Kingdom of God five times, even in adjacent verses, which indicates that these are not synonymous: he is using a more denotative term." Kingdom of God is translated to Latin as Regnum Dei and Kingdom of Heaven as Regnum caelorum.

== Christianity ==
The Old Testament refers to "God the Judge of all" and the notion that all humans will eventually be judged is an essential element of Christian teachings. Building on a number of New Testament passages, the Nicene Creed indicates that the task of judgment is assigned to Jesus.

No overall agreement on the theological interpretation of "Kingdom of God" has emerged among scholars. While a number of theological interpretations of the term Kingdom of God have appeared in its eschatological context, e.g. apocalyptic, realized or Inaugurated eschatologies, no consensus has emerged among scholars.

R. T. France points out that while the concept of the "Kingdom of God" has an intuitive meaning to lay Christians, there is hardly any agreement among scholars about its meaning in the New Testament. Some scholars see it as a Christian lifestyle, some as a method of world evangelization, some as the rediscovery of charismatic gifts, others relate it to no present or future situation, but the world to come. France states that the phrase Kingdom of God is often interpreted in many ways to fit the theological agenda of those interpreting it.

In the New Testament, the Throne of God is alluded to in several forms. Among these are Heaven as the Throne of God, The Throne of David, The Throne of Glory, The Throne of Grace and many more. The New Testament continues the Jewish identification of heaven itself as the "throne of God", but also locates the throne of God as "in heaven" and having a second subordinate seat at the Right Hand of God for the Session of Christ.

== Islam ==
The term "kingdom of God" does not occur in the Quran. The modern Arabic word for kingdom is mamlaka (المملكة), but in the Quran mul'kan (مُّلْكًا), refers to Heaven, e.g. in 4:54 "Or do they envy mankind for what Allah hath given them of his bounty? but We had already given the people of Abraham the Book and Wisdom, and conferred upon them a great kingdom" and 6:75 "Thus did We show Abraham the kingdom of the heavens and the earth." The variant Maalik (Owner, etmologically similar to Malik (king)) occurs in 1:4 "[Allah is] The owner of the Day of Judgement".

== Bahá'í Faith ==
The term "kingdom of God" appears in the writings of the Baháʼí Faith, including the religious works of Bahá'u'lláh, the founder of the religion, and his son `Abdu'l-Bahá. In the Baháʼí teachings, the kingdom of God is seen both as a state of individual being, and the state of the world. Bahá'u'lláh claimed that the scriptures of the world's religions foretell a coming messianic figure that will bring a golden age of humanity, the kingdom of God on earth. He claimed to be that figure, and that his teachings would bring about the kingdom of God; he also noted that the prophecies relating to the end times and the arrival of the kingdom of God were symbolic and referred to spiritual upheaval and renewal. The Baháʼí teachings also state as people worship and serve humanity they become closer to God and develop spiritually, so that they can attain eternal life and enter the kingdom of God while alive.

== See also ==
- Apocalypse
- Christ the King
- Divine presence
- Emperor of Heaven
- King of the gods
- Qaddish
- Queen of Heaven
- New world order (Baháʼí)
- Sermon on the Mount
- Throne of God
- Genesis 2
