= Faculty of Theology, University of Göttingen =

Göttingen Faculty of Theology
- Former names: Facultas Theologicae in Academia Georgia Augusta
- Type: Divinity
- Established: 1737
- Parent institution: University of Göttingen
- Location: Göttingen, Lower Saxony, Germany
- Website: www.uni-goettingen.de/de/sh/19855.html

The Göttingen Faculty of Theology is the divinity school at the University of Göttingen, officially denominated the "United Theological Departments" (German: Vereinigte Theologische Seminare) but commonly referred to as the "Theological Faculty" (German: Theologische Fakultät). It was instituted at the foundation of the University, in 1737, along with the three other original faculties of Law, Medicine, and Philosophy (or Arts). Over the centuries, the Göttingen Faculty of Theology has been home to many influential scholars and movements, including the rise of historical criticism, Ritschlianism, the History of Religions School, and Dialectical Theology. Its members were also involved in the Göttingen school of history.

A Protestant institution, the Theologische Fakultät has long consisted of the five traditional disciplines of theology—Old Testament Studies, New Testament Studies, Church History, Systematic Theology, and Practical Theology—but now includes Religious Studies as well. The faculty has numerous projects, programs, and partnerships with other centers, departments, and faculties across the University as well as the Göttingen Graduate School of Humanities and the Göttingen Academy of Sciences and Humanities.

Besides the Göttingen State and University Library—which stands across from the Faculty's home, the Theologicum—the Faculty of Theology maintains its own specialist library, with current holdings of 170,000 volumes and 250 periodicals.

== Academics ==
The Faculty of Theology educates University students at all levels for bachelor's, master's, and doctoral degrees. (Historically, the Doctor of Theology was considered the highest academic rank, and at the University's foundation, it was mostly reserved for honorary purposes.) It also trains ordinands for the Confederation of Protestant Churches in Lower Saxony. To support its students, the Faculty of Theology runs the Theologisches Stift. This residential college—initiated by Isaak August Dorner modelled on the Tübinger Stift—has its origins in an earlier theological seminary and numbers among the University's oldest institutions.

=== Departments ===
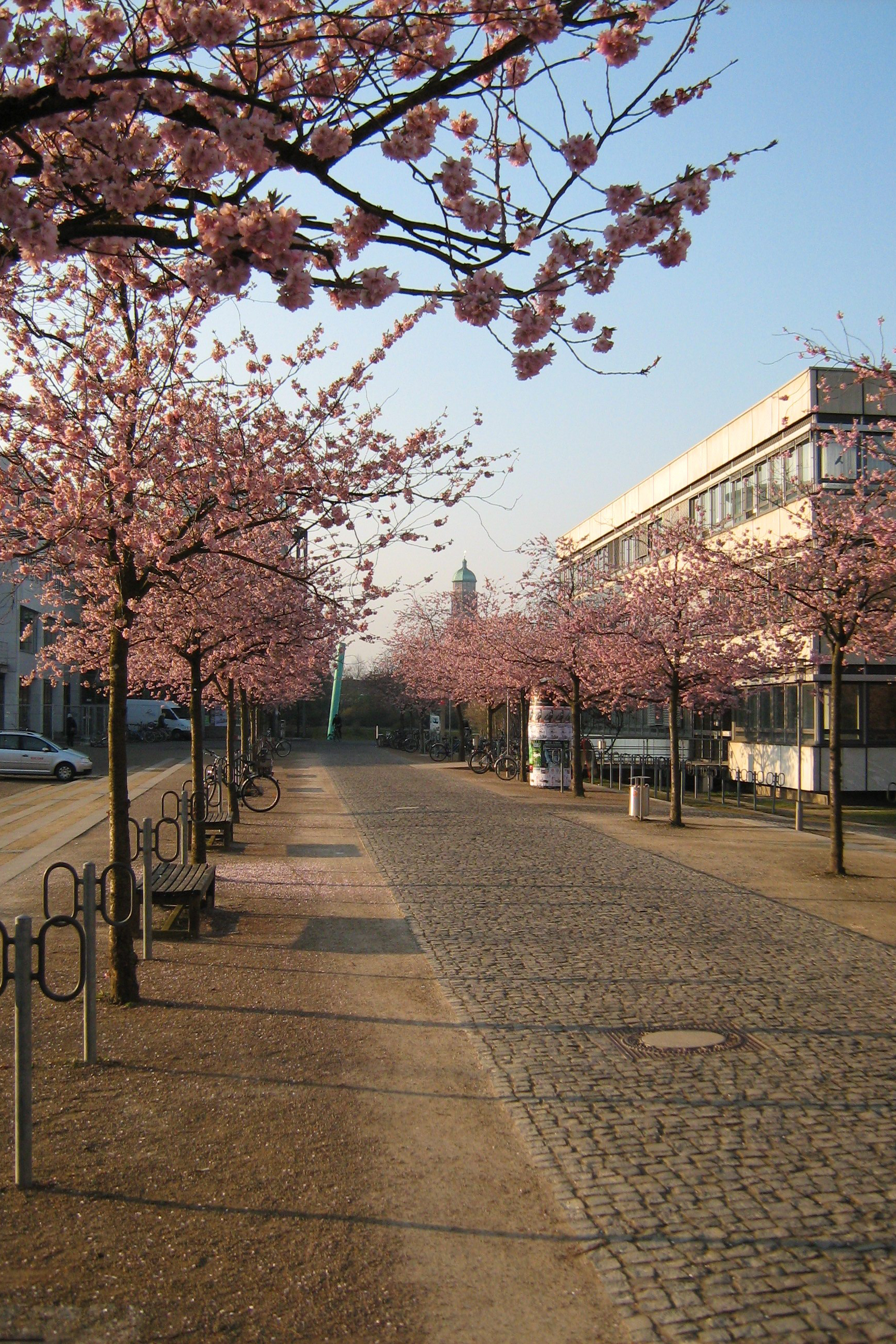
Theologicum

The Faculty is divided into six primary departments, with their own dedicated chairs, researchers, lecturers, and support staff.

- Old Testament Studies
- New Testament Studies
- Church History
- Systematic Theology
- Practical Theology
- Religious Studies

=== Special Research Sections ===
In addition, the Göttingen Faculty of Theology houses other sections for specialized research. These sections often cut across departments within the faculty and involve other faculties as well. They include, among others, the following:

- Institute for Research on Qumran
- Institute for Jewish Studies
- Karl Barth Research Center
- Archive for the History of Relions School
- Division for Hellenistic Religious History

=== Major Research Projects ===
Scholars at the Göttingen Faculty of Theology have launched substantial research undertakings, often in partnership with other institutions. Larger and longer-running ones among them include the following:

- Septuaginta-Unternehmen (1908–2015): a critical edition of the Septuagint (i.e., the Greek translation of the Hebrew Bible), launched by Alfred Rahlfs in cooperation with the Göttingen Academy of Sciences and Humanities
- Qumran-Wörterbuch: a dictionary of the Dead Sea Scrolls, directed by Reinhard Gregor Kratz in collaboration with the Göttingen Academy of Sciences and Humanities
- Critical Edition of the Old Testament in Coptic language together with the Göttingen Academy of Sciences and Humanities
- Götterbilder - Gottesbilder - Weltbilder: Polytheismus und Monotheismus in der Welt der Antike (2004–2012): an interdisciplinary graduate school or "research training group" (Graduiertenkolleg) for religion in the ancient world, directed by Hermann Spieckermann through support from the Deutsche Forschungsgemeinschaft
- "Early Jewish Monotheisms" (2009–2014): a research group on the history of Judaism, led by Nathan MacDonald and supported by the Sofia Kovalevskaya Award of the Alexander von Humboldt Foundation

=== Lecture Series ===
- Julius-Wellhausen-Vorlesung—a lecture series delivered by distinguished scholars—held in conjunction with the Göttingen Centrum Orbis Orientalis et Occidentalis

== People ==
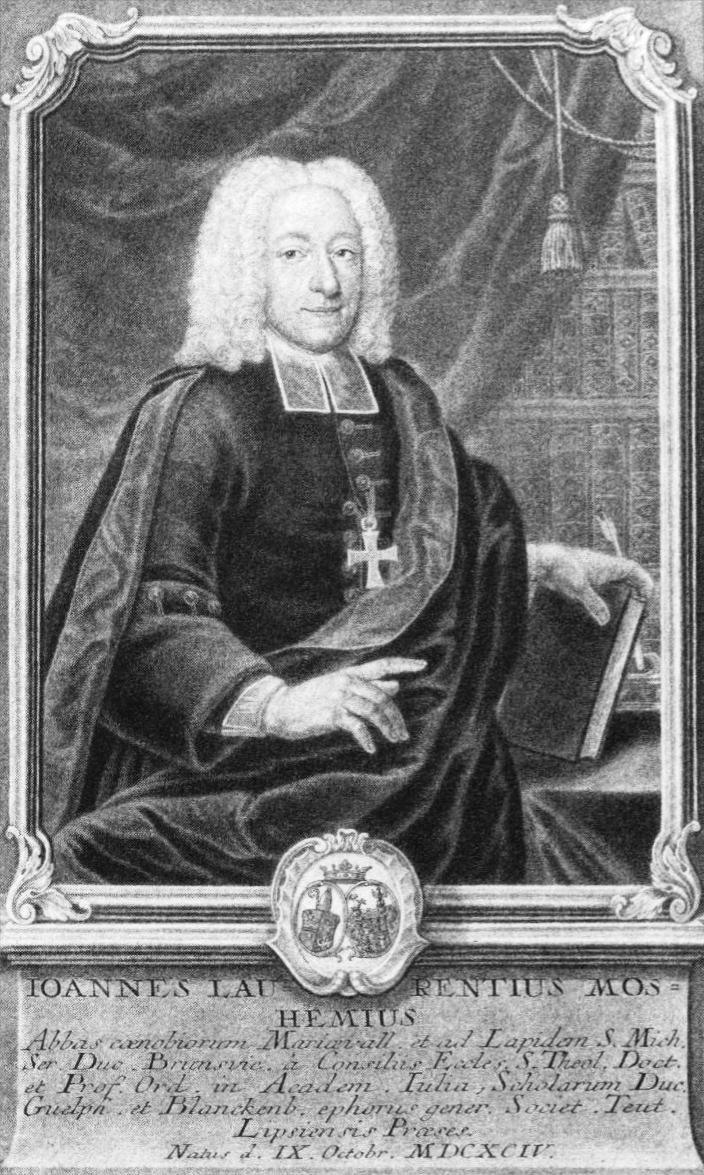
Johannes Laurentius von Mosheim, Professor of Church History

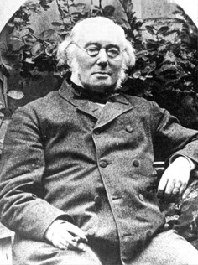
Albrecht Ritschl, Professor of Dogmatics and Church History

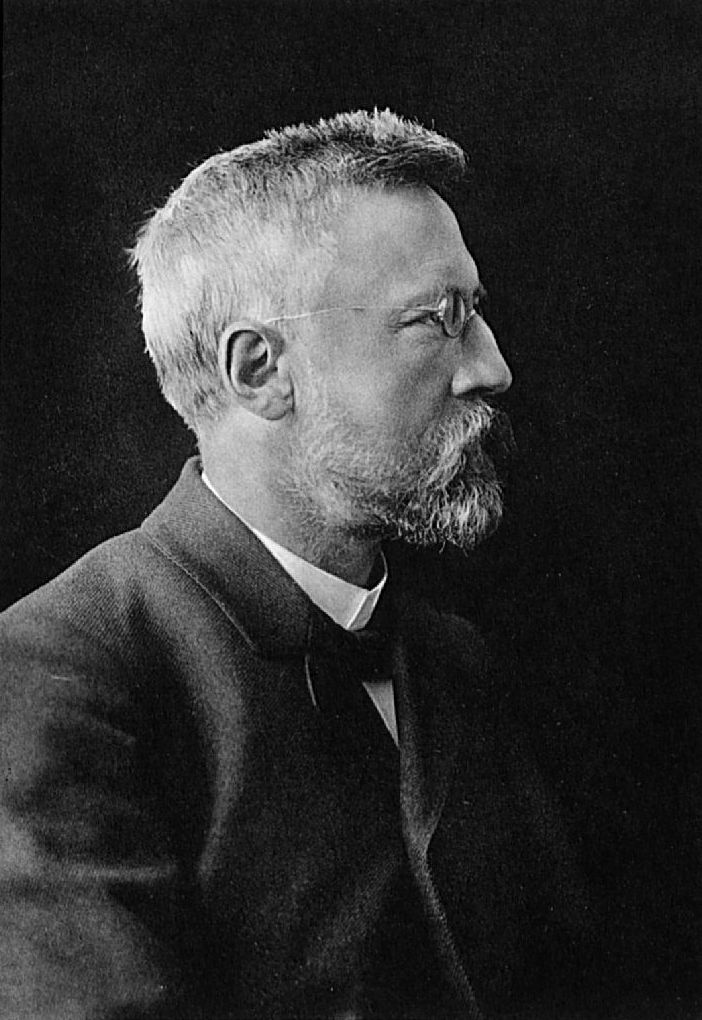
Rudolf Smend, Professor of Old Testament

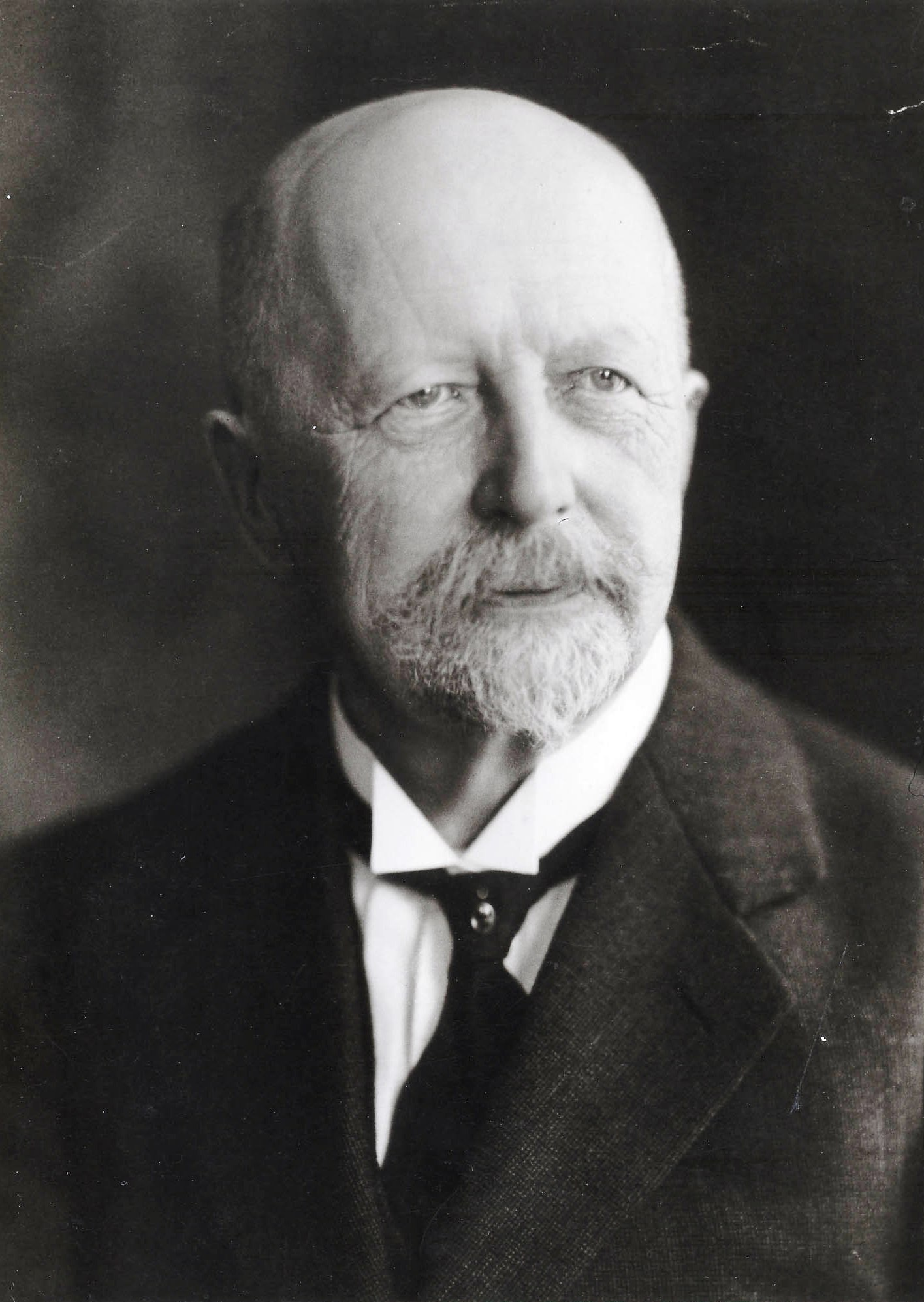
Carl Mirbt, Professor of Church History

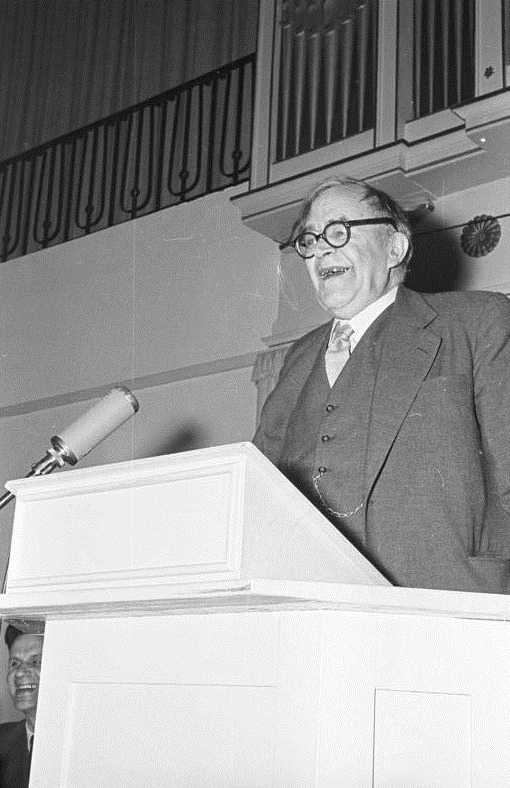
Karl Barth, Professor of Reformed Theology

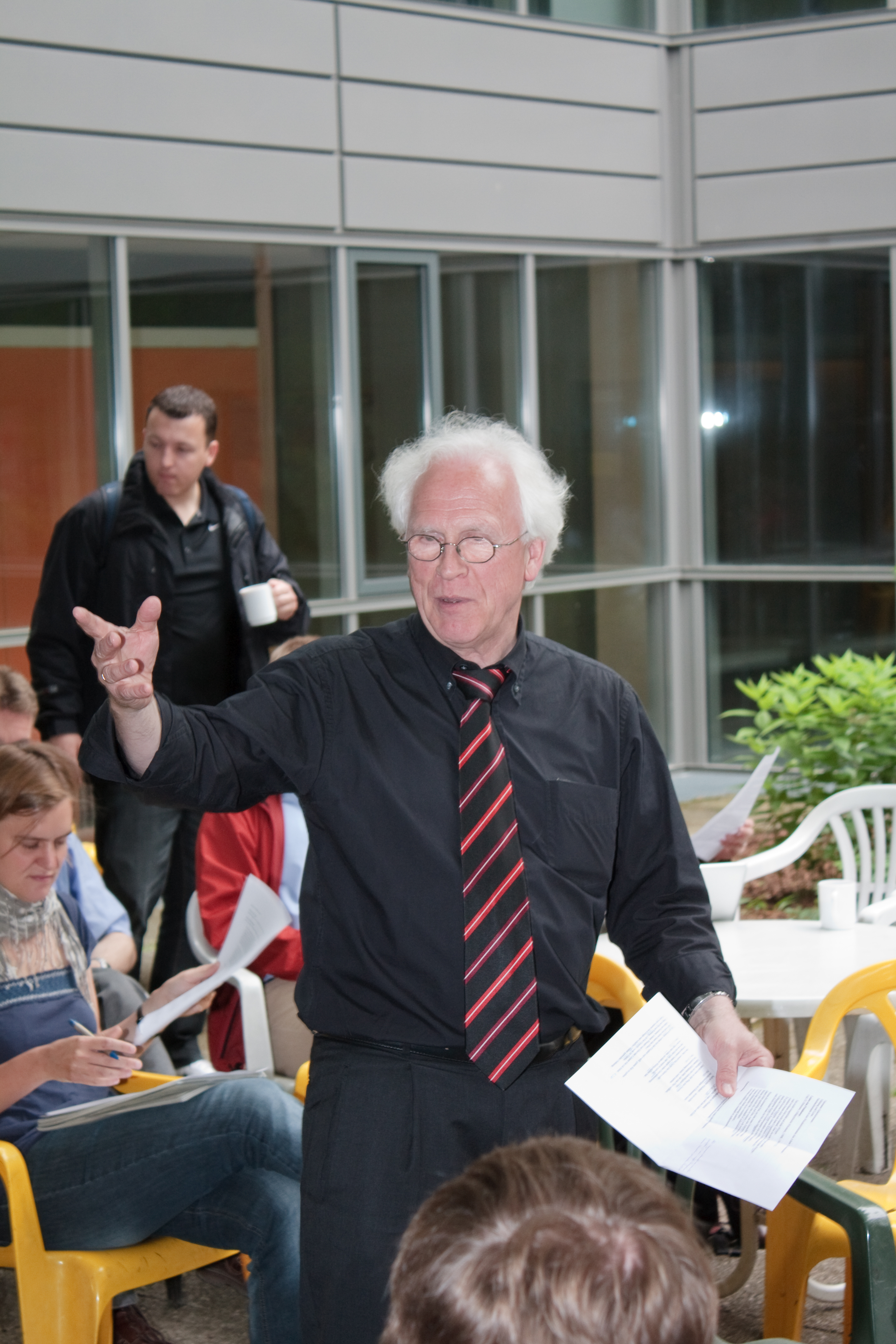
Hermann Spieckermann, Professor of Old Testament

=== Notable Members ===
The following are notable past and present senior associates of the Faculty of Theology:

==== Past ====
- Karl Barth
- Günther Bornkamm
- Hans Conzelmann
- Heinrich Ewald
- Ernst Käsemann
- Johann David Michaelis
- Nathan MacDonald
- Carl Mirbt
- Bernd Moeller
- Johann Lorenz von Mosheim
- Alfred Rahlfs
- Albrecht Ritschl
- Rudolf Smend
- Paul Tschackert
- Gerhard von Rad
- Walther Zimmerli
- Gerd Lüdemann

==== Present ====
- Reinhard Gregor Kratz
- Hermann Spieckermann
- Andreas Grünschloß

=== Notable Students ===
The following are notable students of the Faculty of Theology:

- Wilhelm Bousset
- Albert Eichhorn
- Richard Gaffin
- Hermann Gunkel
- Wilhelm Heitmüller
- Jürgen Moltmann
- Rudolf Otto
- Otto Ritschl
- Ernst Troeltsch
- Johannes Weiss
- Julius Wellhausen
- Paul Wernle
- William Wrede
- Jacob L. Wright

== Bibliography ==
- Bernd Moeller, ed. Theologie in Göttingen. Eine Vorlesungsreihe. Göttingen: Vandenhoeck & Ruprecht, 1987.
- Gerd Lüdemann, ed. Die “Religionsgeschichtliche Schule”. Facetten eines theologischen Umbruchs. Studien und Texte zur Religionsgeschichtlichen Schule 1. Frankfurt: Peter Lang, 1996.
- Gerd Lüdemann and Martin Schröder, eds. Die Religionsgeschichtliche Schule in Göttingen. Eine Dokumentation. Göttingen: Vandenhoeck & Ruprecht, 1987.
- Kurt Meier. Die theologischen Fakultäten im Dritten Reich. Berlin: Walter de Gruyter, 1996.
- Hans-Günther Schotter, ed. Die Geschichte der Verfassung und der Fachbereiche der Georg-August-Universität zu Göttingen. Göttingen: Vandenhoeck & Ruprecht, 1994.
- Bernd Schröder and Heiko Wojtkowiak, eds. Stiftsgeschichte(n). 250 Jahre Theologisches Stift der Universität Göttingen (1765–2015). Göttingen: Vandenhoeck & Ruprecht, 2015.
- Leonore Siegele-Wenschkewitz and Carsten Nicolaisen, eds. Theologische Fakultäten im Nationalsozialismus. Göttingen: Vandenhoeck & Ruprecht, 1993.
- Rudolf Smend. "Eine Fakultät in kritischer Zeit. Die Göttinger Theologie zwischen 1930 und 1950." In idem, Zwischen Mose und Karl Barth. Akademische Vorträge. Tübingen: Mohr Siebeck, 2009.
- Jürgen von Stackelberg, ed. Zur geistigen Situation der Zeit der Göttinger Universitätsgründung, 1737. Eine Vortragsreihe aus Anlass des 250jährigen Bestehens der Georgia Augusta. Göttingen: Vandenhoeck & Ruprecht, 1988.
