= OTSEM =

Northern European university research network

OTSEM (Old Testament Studies: Epistemologies and Methods) is a research network of several Northern European universities. Originally Nordic-German in nature, it now includes British universities as well, which gives it a Nordic-German-Anglo profile. The organization focuses on research into the Hebrew Bible and promotes the development of young scholars in particular, especially through annual seminars and special lectures. Though encompassing theological faculties and using the term Old Testament, OTSEM is non-confessional, with members from Christian (both Protestant and Catholic), Jewish, Muslim, and secular backgrounds.

== Institutions ==
Currently, OTSEM consists of sixteen institutions from eight different countries:

- Denmark: University of Copenhagen, Aarhus University
- Estonia: University of Tartu (affiliated through Helsinki)
- Finland: University of Helsinki, Åbo Akademi University
- Germany: University of Göttingen, University of Hamburg
- Iceland: University of Iceland
- Great Britain: University of Oxford, King's College London, University of Edinburgh
- Norway: University of Oslo, MF Norwegian School of Theology, VID Specialized University
- Sweden: Uppsala University, Lund University

== History ==
The history of OTSEM divides into three distinct periods: Proto-OTSEM, OTSEM I, and OTSEM II (the present iteration).

=== Proto-OTSEM ===
OTSEM's antecedents reach back to the 1970s. At that time, Helsinki and Göttingen had a student and professor exchange between their theological faculties. Beginning in the 1990s, bi- and trilateral doctoral seminars took place among the various institutions that would later become members of OTSEM.

- 1994: Helsinki visited Hamburg (where current Göttingen affiliates previously were)
- 1995: Aarhus visited Hamburg
- 1996: Hamburg visited Aarhus
- 1997: Lund visited Hamburg
- 1998: Hamburg visited Lund
- 2000: Göttingen visited Lund
- 2001: Lund and Oslo visited MF
- 2002: MF visited Göttingen
- 2003: Lund, Göttingen, and Oslo visited MF

In addition to arranging doctoral seminars, future members also organised professorial exchanges.

- 1995: Hamburg visited Aarhus
- 1998: Lund visited Aarhus
- 1999: Helsinki visited Göttingen; Aarhus visited Lund and MF; Lund visited MF
- 2000: Helsinki visited Göttingen; Göttingen visited Lund; Lund visited MF; MF visited Lund
- 2001: Lund visited MF; Helsinki visited MF

=== OTSEM I ===
From 2004 through 2008, the Nordic Council (NordForsk) co-funded the research network. In this period, OTSEM saw formalization and expansion. This expansion included an increase in not only the number of members and member institutions but also meetings and individual exchanges. In particular, the now formal organization commenced its annual conferences (Oslo in 2004, Göttingen in 2005, Aarhus in 2006, Helsinki in 2008, and Lund in 2008). With the end of funding from the Nordic Council came the end of OTSEM I and start of OTSEM II.

=== OTSEM II ===
Since 2009, OTSEM has been financed solely by its associated institutions. Nevertheless, the research network has continued its annual conference and individual exchanges.

== Notable members ==
OTSEM members with a high international profile have included the following:

- John Barton
- Fredrik Lindström
- Reinhard Gregor Kratz
- Nathan MacDonald
- Martti Nissinen
- Hermann Spieckermann
- Hugh G. M. Williamson
- Terje Stordalen
