= Richard August Reitzenstein =

German classical philologist and historian of religion (1861-1931)

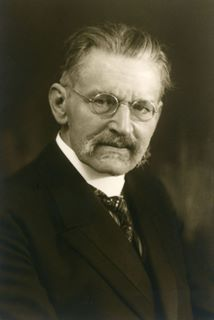
Richard August Reitzenstein

Richard August Reitzenstein (2 April 1861, in Breslau – 23 March 1931, in Göttingen) was a German classical philologist and scholar of Ancient Greek religion, hermetism and Gnosticism. He is described by Kurt Rudolph as “one of the most stimulating Gnostic scholars.” With Wilhelm Bousset, he was one of the major figures of the Religionsgeschichtliche Schule (history of religions school).

His Poimandres: Studien zur Griechisch-Ägyptischen und frühchristlichen Literatur of 1904 was a pioneer scholarly study of the Poimandres, which he compared to the Shepherd of Hermas.

In collaboration with the German Egyptologist Wilhelm Spiegelberg, Richard August Reitzenstein founded a famous collection of Greek and Egyptian papyri, purchased during an expedition in Egypt in 1898/99.

Bousset, then Reitzenstein along with Rudolf Bultmann, were notable for promoting theories of pre-Christian gnosticism, and the influence of gnosticism on the New Testament. Modern scholars now reject these theories, while acknowledging that many of the features of later Christian gnosticism can be drawn from pre-Christian Jewish and Hellenistic roots.

== Selected works ==
- De scriptorum rei rusticae qui intercedunt inter Catonem et Columellam libris deperditis (1884)
- Verrianische Forschungen (1887)
- Arriani τῶν μἑτ’ Ἀλεξἁνδρου libri septimi fragmenta e codice Vaticano rescripto edita (1888)
- Supplementa ad Procli Commentarios in Platonis De republica libros nuper vulgatos e codice Vaticano rescripto nuper iteratis curis lecto (1889)
- Drei Vermutungen zur Geschichte der romischen Litteratur [includes: Die Abfassungszeit des ersten Buches Ciceros de Legibus; Ein litterarischer Angriff auf Octavian; Lukrez und Cicero] (1893)
- Epigramm und Skolion : ein Beitrag zur Geschichte der alexandrinischen Dichtung (1893)
- Geschichte der griechischen Etymologika : ein Beitrag zur Geschichte der Philologie in Alexandria und Byzanz (1897)
- Zwei religionsgeschichtliche Fragen nach ungedruckten griechischen Texten der Straßburger Bibliothek (1901)
- M. Terentius Varro und Johannes Mauropus von Euchaita : eine Studie zur Geschichte der Sprachwissenschaft (1901)
- Poimandres : Studien zur griechisch-ägyptischen und frühchristlichen Literatur (1904)
- Hellenistische Wundererzählunge (1906)
- Der Anfang des Lexikons des Photios (1907)
- Werden und Wesen der Humanität im Altertum (1907)
- Studien zu Quintilians größeren Deklamationen (1909)
- Die hellenistischen Mysterienreligionen : ihre Grundgedanken und Wirkungen (1910). 3rd enlarged edition: 1927
- Das Märchen von Amor und Psyche bei Apuleius (1912)
- Zur Sprache der lateinischen Erotik (1912)
- Die Nachrichten über den Tod Cyprians : ein philologischer Beitrag zur Geschichte der Märtyrerliteratur (1913)
- Des Athanasius Werk über das Leben des Antonius : ein philologischer Beitrag zur Geschichte des Mönchtums (1914)
- Bemerkungen zu den kleinen Schriften des Tacitus (1914)
- Eros und Psyche in der ägyptisch-griechischen Kleinkunst (1914)
- Bemerkungen zur Martyrienliteratur. I, Die Bezeichnung Märtyrer (1916)
- Die Formel Glaube, Liebe, Hoffnung bei Paulus (1916)
- Historia Monachorum und Historia Lausiaca : eine Studie zur Geschichte des Mönchtums und der frühchristlichen Begriffe Gnostiker und Pneumatiker (1916)
- Die Göttin Psyche in der hellenistischen und frühchristlichen Literatur (1917)
- Die Idee des Principats bei Cicero und Augustus (1917)
- Bemerkungen zur Märtyrerliteratur. II, Nachträge zu den Akten Cyprians (1919)
- Das mandäische Buch des Herrn der Größe und die Evangelienüberlieferung (1919)
- Das iranische Erlösungsmysterium : religionsgeschichtliche Untersuchungen (1921)
- Alchemistische Lehrschriften und Märchen bei den Arabern [in: Heliodori carmina quattuor ad fidem codicis Casselani edidit Günther Goldschmidt] (1923)
- Die griechische Tefnutlegende (1923)
- Weltuntergangs-Vorstellungen : eine Studie zur vergleichenden Religionsgeschichte (1924)
- Studien zum antiken Synkretismus aus Iran und Griechenland [with Hans Heinrich Schaeder] (1926)
- Die hellenistischen Mysterienreligionen (1927). English translation by J.E. Steely (1978) as: Hellenistic mystery-religions : their basic ideas and significance
- Die Vorgeschichte der christlichen Taufe (1929)
- Eine wertlose und eine wertvolle Überlieferung über den Manichäismus (1931)
- Antike und Christentum : vier religionsgeschichtliche Aufsätze [papers originally published in the Vorträge der Bibliothek Warburg, 1922-1925. Includes: Alt-griechische Theologie und ihre Quellen; Plato und Zarathustra; Augustin als antiker und als mittelalterlicher Mensch; Die nordischen, persischen und christlichen Vorstellungen vom Weltuntergang] (1963)
- Aufsätze zu Horaz : Abhandlungen und Vorträge aus den Jahren 1908-1925 (1963) [includes 7 essays]
- Aufsätze zu Tacitus [includes: Zur Textgeschichte der Germania (1898); Das deutsche Heldenlied bei Tacitus (1913); Bemerkungen zu den kleinen Schriften des Tacitus (1914); Tacitus und sein Werk (1926)] (1967)
