= Hermann Spieckermann =

German theologian

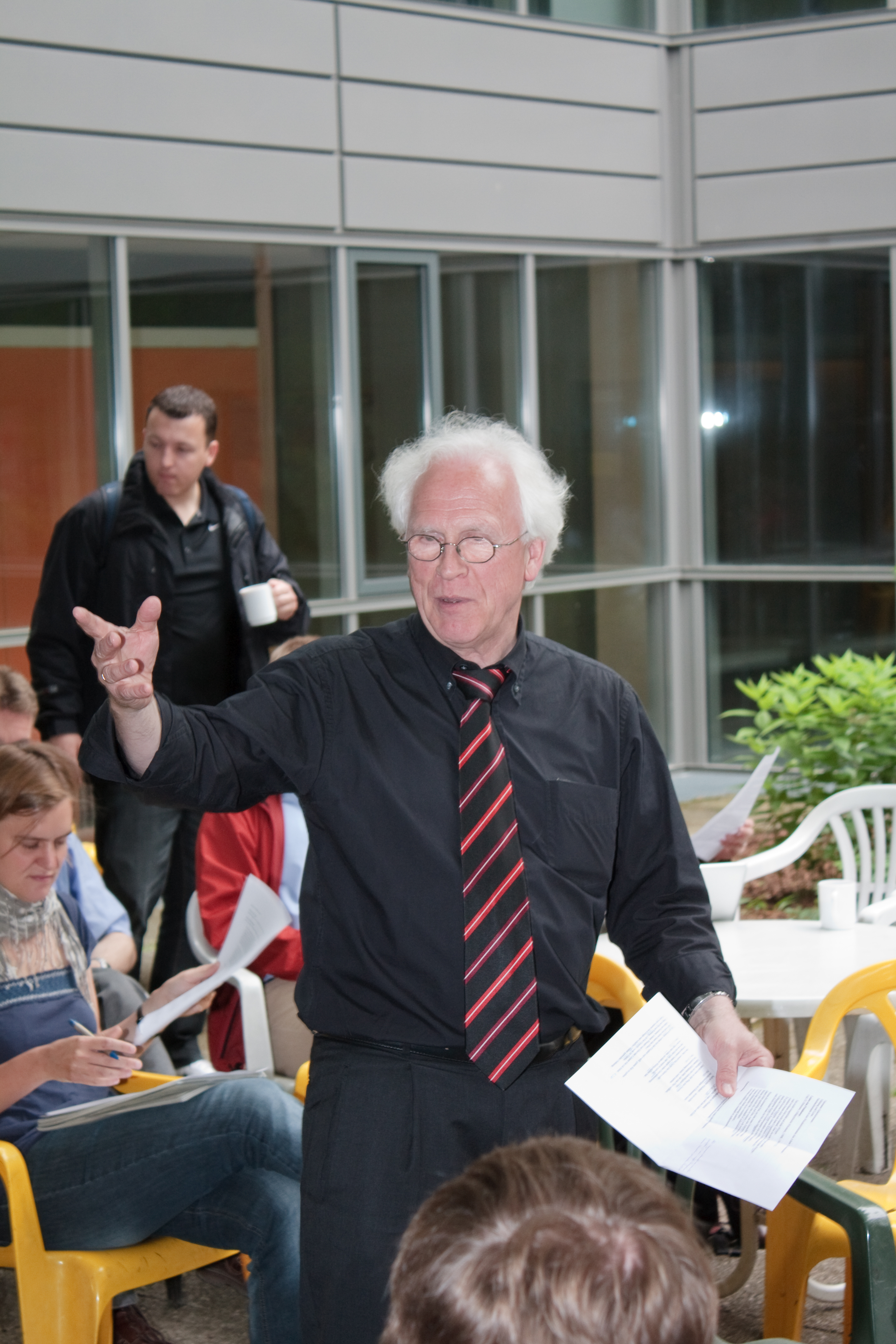

Hermann Spieckermann (born October 28, 1950, in Dortmund) is a German biblical scholar, historian of ancient Near Eastern religion, and Protestant theologian. He currently holds a chair for Old Testament, or Hebrew Bible, in the Faculty of Theology at the University of Göttingen, in Germany. Through extensive authorial, editorial, and organizational undertakings, Spieckermann has exerted considerable influence on Hebrew Bible research.

== Life ==
Spieckermann studied theology and assyriology at the universities of Münster and Göttingen from 1969 to 1975. Having already specialized in the field of Old Testament, or Hebrew Bible, during his university studies, he served as scientific assistant to the Göttingen Old Testament scholar Lothar Perlitt after his exams (1975–88). In 1982, he earned a doctor theologiae and secured habilitation in the field of Old Testament Studies five years later, in 1987. While in Göttingen, Spieckermann also worked closely with the renowned Dutch assyriologist Riekele Borger. He served as Privatdozent for two years in Göttingen before receiving a call to the University of Zürich as associate professor of Old Testament and the history of Near Eastern religion, in 1989. Three years later, in 1992, he moved to the University of Hamburg to hold a full professorship in the same field. Since the 1999–2000 academic year, Spieckermann has served as professor of Old Testament at the University of Göttingen.

== Areas of expertise ==
With his first monograph, Juda unter Assur in der Sargonidenzeit, Spieckermann demonstrated a mastery of biblical criticism, assyriology, and ancient Near Eastern history. His primary research then shifted to the Psalter and Wisdom literature. More recently, he has helped turn biblical scholarship—as both author and editor—to the field of reception history, working closely with Choon-Leong Seow in this regard. Throughout all his academic undertakings, Spieckermann has maintained a strong interest in the history of theology as reflected in biblical texts as well as the history of biblical scholarship itself. In 2011, he coauthored—with New Testament scholar and Göttingen professor Reinhard Feldmeier—an acclaimed volume, in both German and English translation, that presents the conceptualization of God across the Old and New Testaments.

== Academic honors ==
Among other honors and awards, Spieckermann was guest professor at the Pontifical Biblical Institute in Rome, in 1999, and received an honorary doctorate in theology from Sweden's University of Lund the next year, in 2000. In 1997, he declined a chair at the Heidelberg University. He is also a former member of the Göttingen Academy of Sciences.

== Professional activities ==
Spieckermann currently serves on the board of directors for the academy's Septuagint-Unternehmen as well as its Qumran dictionary. He also sits on the prestigious board of the International Organization for the Study of the Old Testament, together with that of its journal, Vetus Testamentum, and book series, Vetus Testamentum Supplements. Spieckermann holds positions on any number of other editorial boards in addition: from Walter de Gruyter's Theologische Realenzyklopädie (TRE) and, formerly, Encyclopedia of the Bible and Its Reception (EBR) through Mohr Siebeck's Forschungen zum Alten Testament (FAT) and Topics of Biblical Theology (TOBITH) to Vandenhoeck & Ruprecht's Altes Testament Deutsch (ATD). In 2004, he became speaker of the nine-year-long German Research Foundation Research Training Group (Graduiertenkolleg) 896 "Concepts of the Divine – Concepts of the World," and the next year, he joined Göttingen's Graduate School of Humanities (GSGG). Furthermore, Spieckermann hosted Nathan MacDonald's major research project "Early Jewish Monotheisms," which was funded through the Alexander von Humboldt Foundation's Sofia Kovalevskaya Award. He also helped found the Northern European research network Old Testament Studies: Epistemologies and Methods OTSEM. In many of these endeavors, he has worked closely with his Göttingen Old Testament colleague, Reinhard Gregor Kratz.

== Select publications ==
- Juda unter Assur in der Sargonidenzeit (Forschungen zur Religion und Literatur des Alten und Neuen Testaments 129; Göttingen: Vandenhoeck & Ruprecht, 1982).
- Heilgegenwart (Forschungen zur Religion und Literatur des Alten und Neuen Testaments H148; Göttingen: Vandenhoeck & Ruprecht, 1989).
- Der Gotteskampf: Jakob und der Engel in Bibel und Kunst (Zürich: Theologischer Verlag, 1997).
- Gottes Liebe zu Israel: Studien zur Theologie des Alten Testaments (Forschungen zum Alten Testament 33; Tübingen: Mohr Siebeck, 2011).
- With Reinhard Feldmeier, Der Gott der Lebendigen: Eine biblische Gotteslehre (Topoi Biblischer Theologie 1; Tübingen: Mohr Siebeck, 2011). [English Translation: God of the Living: A Biblical Theology. Translated by Mark E. Biddle. (Waco: Baylor University Press, 2011)] [Portuguese Translation: O Deus dos vivos: Uma doutrina bíblica de Deus. Translated by Uwe Wegner. (São Leopoldo: Ed. Sinodal, 2015)].
- Lebenskunst und Gottlieb in Israel (Forschungen zum Alten Testament 91; Tübingen: Mohr Siebeck, 2014).

== Literature on Spieckermann ==
- Werner Schuder (ed.): Kürschners Deutscher Gelehrten-Kalender 1980. Bio-bibliographisches Verzeichnis deutschsprachiger Wissenschaftler der Gegenwart. Vol 3: S – Z, Register. 13. ed. Saur et al., München et al. 1979, ISBN 3-11-007434-6.
