= Hugo Gressmann =

Hugo Gressmann (March 21, 1877 – April 6, 1927) was a prominent Old Testament scholar in Protestant Germany and a friend and associate of the eminent scholar Hermann Gunkel. He was a member of the history of religions school.

== Early life ==
He was born on March 21, 1877, in Mölln, in the Province of Schleswig-Holstein.

== Gattungsgeschichte method ==
Gressmann carried over the work of Gunkel in which he used the Gattungsgeschichte method of Biblical study (otherwise known as Form Criticism) and applied it to the books of Exodus, Joshua, Judges, Ruth, 1 & 2 Samuel and 1 & 2 Kings, in the Old Testament.

He took a traditio-historical approach in examining these passages, aiming to examine individual units so as to glean from them their original setting and purpose.

== Conflict with the ideas of Wellhausen ==
Gressmann was significant in that he disagreed with the ideas of Julius Wellhausen, another eminent Biblical scholar, on the dates of the Decalogue (more commonly known as the Ten Commandments). Whereas Wellhausen placed the date at a relatively late stage in the history of Israel, Gressmann argued that, as they bore no evidence of having been influenced by Canaan, they must have been composed at a far earlier stage in Israel's history. Furthermore, he argued that they were older than the Prophets.

== Death ==
Gressmann died on April 6, 1927, in Chicago.
