= Hermann Gunkel =

German evangelical theologian

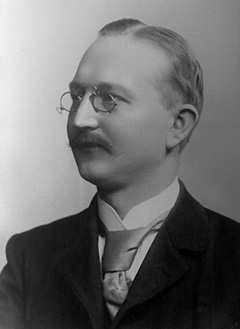
- Gunkel before 1890
- Born: 23 May 1862; Springe, Kingdom of Hanover
- Died: 11 March 1932 (aged 69); Halle, Weimar Republic
- Education: University of Göttingen
- Occupation: Biblical historical criticism
- Known for: Founding form criticism, Sitz im Leben

Hermann Gunkel (German: [gʊŋkl̩]; 23 May 1862 – 11 March 1932) was a German Old Testament scholar and the founder of form criticism. He also became a leading representative of the history of religions school. His major works cover Genesis and the Psalms, and his major interests centered on the oral tradition behind written sources and in folklore.

== Biography ==
Gunkel was born in Springe, Kingdom of Hanover, where his father and grandfather were Lutheran pastors. He studied at the University of Göttingen and the University of Giessen. He eventually taught at both universities in addition to those of Berlin and Halle.

Gunkel started his career in New Testament studies at Göttingen in 1888. However, he was soon transferred to Halle (1889–1894) and told to concentrate on the Hebrew Bible by the Prussian academic appointments authority. He went on to teach in Berlin (1894-1907), where he made many inter-disciplinary contacts. His 1895 book Creation and Chaos in the Primeval Era and the Eschaton compared the symbolism in Genesis and Revelation 12. In 1901, he produced the first of three editions of commentary on Genesis, Genesis Translated and Explained.

In 1907, Gunkel finally obtained a full professorship at the University of Giessen. There he produced the third and final edition of Genesis in 1910 and The Prophets in 1917. He moved to the University of Halle-Wittenberg in 1920. He published another standard work, his commentary on the book of Psalms, The Psalms: Translated and Explained in 1926. Introduction to the Psalms was his last major project, brought to completion by his student Joachim Begrich in 1933.

Gunkel founded the series Research into the Religion and Literature of the Old and New Testaments (1903–) with Wilhelm Bousset. He also co-edited with Leopold Zscharnack the second edition of the German religious encyclopedia Religion in History and the Present (1927–1931), in which he authored over one hundred articles.

== Work ==
"The influence of the methods pioneered by Gunkel upon subsequent Old Testament study can scarcely be overestimated."

— Ernest Nicholson, "Foreword: Hermann Gunkel as a Pioneer of Modern Old Testament Study", in Hermann Gunkel, Genesis (trans. Mark E. Biddle; Macon, GA: Mercer University Press, 1997), 9.

Gunkel became a leading representative of the "history of religions school" (Religionsgeschichtliche Schule), which addressed the history of traditions behind the biblical text. In addition to Gunkel, the original group also included Albert Eichhorn, William Wrede, Heinrich Hackmann, Alfred Rahlfs, Johannes Weiss, Wilhelm Bousset, Ernst Troeltsch, and Wilhelm Heitmüller. Gunkel and the school thought that the oral traditions that form the origins of the Hebrew Bible were directly tied to other Near Eastern religions. Gunkel arguably produced his most important work in his commentary on Genesis, published in three editions from 1901 to 1910. In these works he created the new critical methodology of form criticism (Formgeschichte). Form criticism examined the genres used in the biblical text to identify the Sitz im Leben (setting in life) that produced the text. This approach was based on the assumption that each genre is organically associated with a particular social and historical situation. Nineteenth-century source criticism had examined the biblical text, especially the Pentateuch, on the basis of style, vocabulary, theology, and other criteria to identify the basic literary sources used to create the text. Form criticism allowed scholars to go behind these larger literary sources by identifying the smaller and older sources used by their authors. Because of its utility, form criticism became immensely influential in Germany and Europe during the 20th century, with important scholars like Gerhard von Rad and Martin Noth applying and developing it.

== Major works ==
- The Influence of the Holy Spirit. Translated by Roy A. Harrisville and Phillips A. Quanbeck. Philadelphia: Fortress Press (published 1979). 1888. ISBN 9780800605445.
- Creation and Chaos in the Primeval Era and the Eschaton. Translated by K. William Whitney Jr. Grand Rapids, MI: Wm. B. Eerdmans (published 2006). 1895. ISBN 9780802828040.
- Genesis: Translated and Explained (1st ed.). Göttingen: Vandenhoeck & Ruprecht. 1901. (Introduction translated by William Herbert Carruth and published as The Legends of Genesis in 1901.)
- Israel and Babylon. Translated by E. S. B. and K. C. Hanson. Eugene, OR: Cascade (published 2009). 1903. ISBN 1606082507.
- Genesis: Translated and Explained. Translated by Mark E. Biddle (3rd ed.). Macon, GA: Mercer University Press (published 1997). 1910. ISBN 9780865545175. (Introduction available as The Stories of Genesis)
- The Folktale in the Old Testament. Translated by M. D. Rutter. Sheffield: Almond Press (published 1987). 1917. ISBN 9781850750314.
- The Psalms: A Form-Critical Introduction. Translated by T. M. Horner. Philadelphia: Fortress Press (published 1967). 1926. ISBN 9780800630430.
- An Introduction to the Psalms. Completed by Joachim Begrich and translated by James D. Nogalski. Macon, GA: Mercer University Press (published 1998). 1933. ISBN 9780865545793.
- Elijah, Yahweh, and Baal. Edited and translated by K. C. Hanson. Eugene, OR: Cascade Books (published 2014). 1906. ISBN 9781498201865.
- Water for a Thirsty Land: Israelite Literature and Religion. Fortress Classics in Biblical Studies. Edited by K. C. Hanson and translated by A. K. Dallas and James Schaaf. Minneapolis, MN: Fortress Press (published 2001). 1906. ISBN 9781498201865.
