= Northern Europe =

Northern region of the European continent

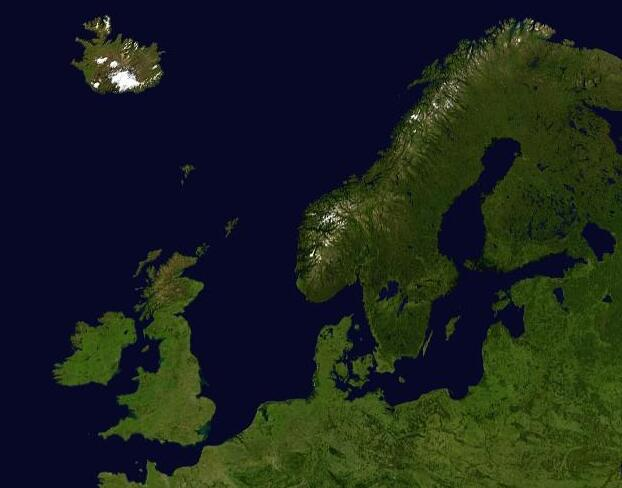
A composed satellite photograph of islands and continental areas in and surrounding the North Sea and Baltic Sea

The northern region of Europe has several definitions. A restrictive definition may describe northern Europe as being roughly north of the southern coast of the Baltic Sea, which is about 54°N, or may be based on other geographical factors such as climate and ecology.

== Climate ==
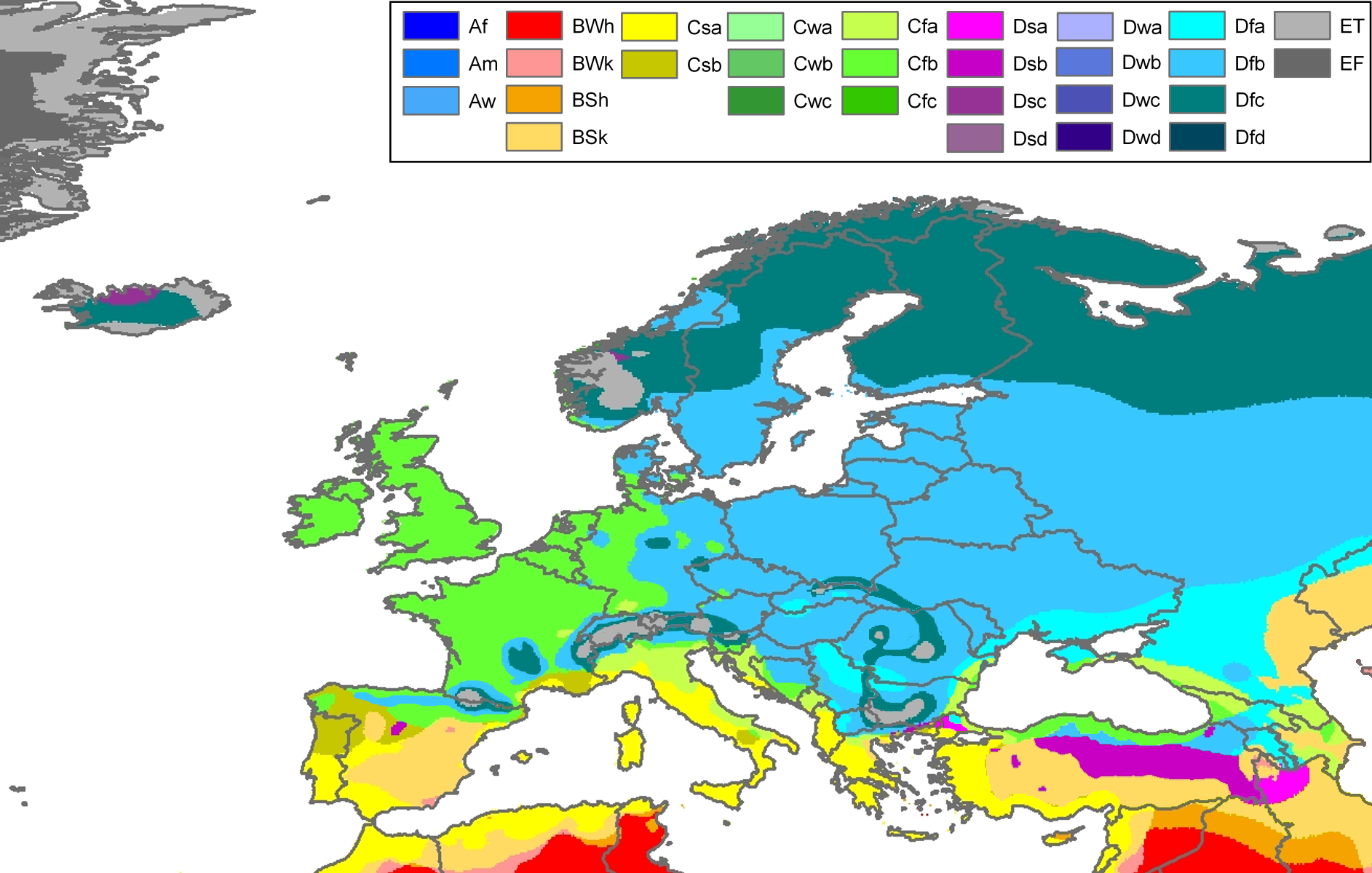
European climate. The Köppen climate classification map is presented by the Climatic Research Unit of the University of East Anglia and the Global Precipitation Climatology Center of the Deutscher Wetterdienst.

The climate is mainly Oceanic climate (Cfb), Humid continental climate (Dfb), Subarctic climate (Dfc and Dsc) and Tundra (ET).

== Geography ==
Northern Europe might be defined roughly to include some or all of the following areas: British Isles, Fennoscandia, the peninsula of Jutland, the Baltic plain that lies to the east, and the many islands that lie offshore from mainland northern Europe and the main European continent. In some cases, Greenland is also included, although it is only politically European, comprising part of the Kingdom of Denmark, and not considered to be geographically in Europe.

The area is partly mountainous, including the northern volcanic islands of Iceland and Jan Mayen, and the mountainous western seaboard, Scotland and Scandinavia, and also often includes part of the large plain east of the Baltic Sea.

The entire region's climate is at least mildly affected by the Gulf Stream. From the west climates vary from maritime and maritime subarctic climates. In the north and central climates are generally subarctic or Arctic and to the east climates are mostly subarctic and temperate/continental.

Just as both climate and relief are variable across the region, so too is vegetation, with sparse tundra in the north and high mountains, boreal forest on the north-eastern and central regions temperate coniferous forests (formerly of which a majority was in the Scottish Highlands and southwestern Norway) and temperate broadleaf forests growing in the south, west and temperate east.

== Classifications ==
There are various definitions of northern Europe which always include the Nordic countries, often the British Isles and Baltic states, and sometimes Greenland.

=== UN geoscheme classification ===
Subregions of Europe by United Nations geoscheme: Eastern Europe Northern Europe Southern Europe Western Europe

The United Nations geoscheme is a system devised by the United Nations Statistics Division (UNSD) which divides the countries of the world into regional and subregional groups, based on the M49 coding classification. The partition is for statistical convenience and does not imply any assumption regarding political or other affiliation of countries or territories.

In the UN geoscheme, the following countries are classified as being in northern Europe:

- Denmark
- Estonia
- Finland
- Iceland
- Ireland
- Latvia
- Lithuania
- Norway
- Sweden
- United Kingdom

as well as the dependent areas:

- Åland
- Channel Islands
  - Bailiwick of Guernsey
  - Bailiwick of Jersey
- Faroe Islands
- Isle of Man
- Svalbard and Jan Mayen

=== EuroVoc ===
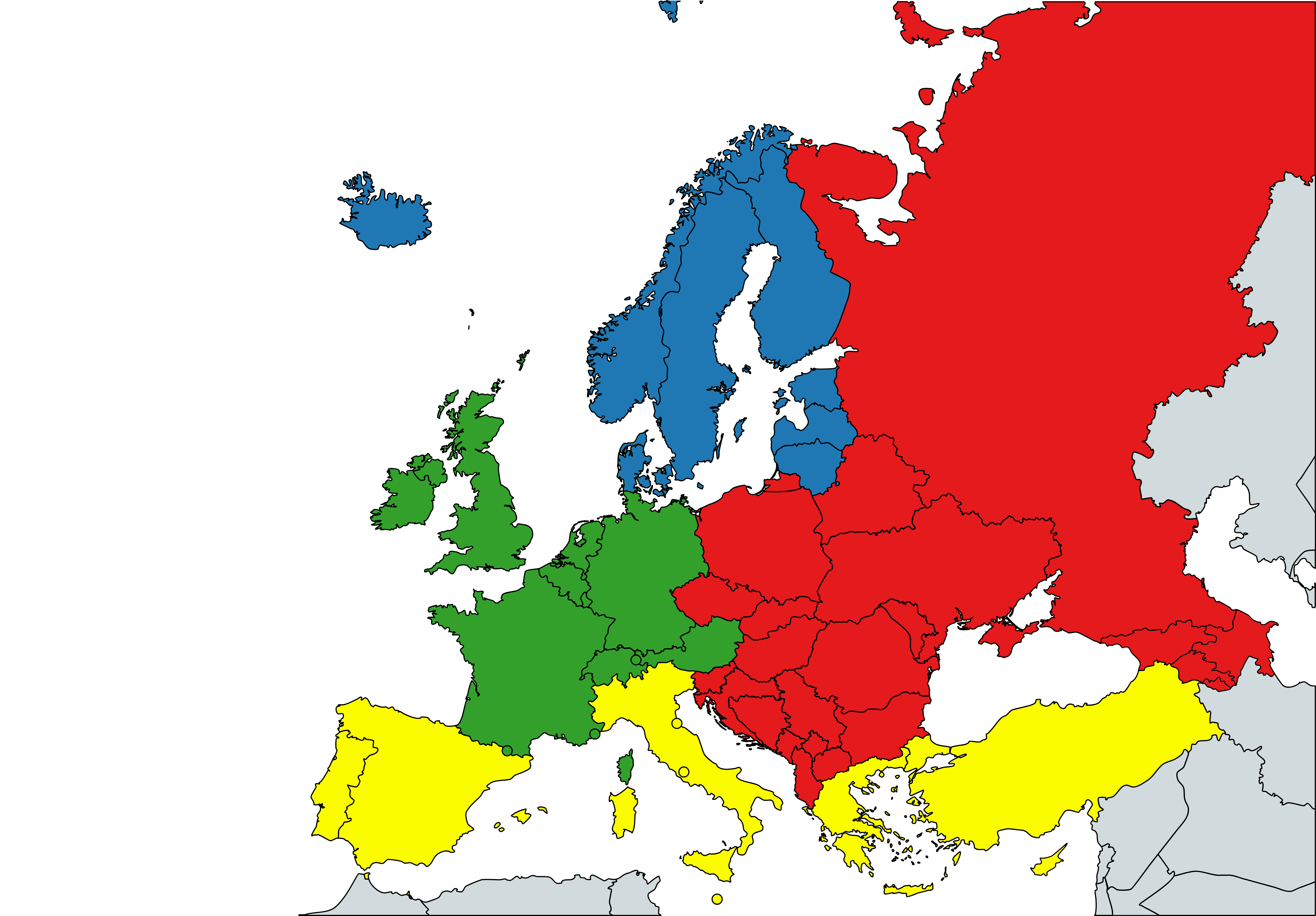
European sub-regions according to EuroVoc: Northern Europe Western Europe Southern Europe Central and Eastern Europe

EuroVoc is a multilingual thesaurus maintained by the Publications Office of the European Union, giving definitions of terms for official use. In the definition of "northern Europe", the following countries are included:

- Estonia
- Latvia
- Lithuania
- Denmark
- Finland
- Iceland
- Norway
- Sweden

as well as the dependent area:

- Faroe Islands

In this classification Jersey, Guernsey, the Isle of Man, the United Kingdom and Ireland are included in Western Europe.

=== CIA World Factbook ===
Regions of Europe based on CIA World Factbook: Northern Europe Western Europe Central Europe Southwest Europe Southern Europe Southeast Europe Eastern Europe

In the CIA World Factbook, the description of each country includes information about "Location" under the heading "Geography", where the country is classified into a region. The following countries are included in their classification "northern Europe":

- Denmark
- Finland
- Iceland
- Norway
- Sweden

as well as the dependent areas:

- Faroe Islands
- Jan Mayen
- Svalbard

In this classification Jersey, Guernsey, the Isle of Man, the United Kingdom and Ireland are included in Western Europe, while Estonia, Latvia and Lithuania are included in Eastern Europe.

=== World Geographical Scheme for Recording Plant Distributions ===
Northern Europe, as defined by the World Geographical Scheme for Recording Plant Distributions

The World Geographical Scheme for Recording Plant Distributions is a biogeographical system developed by the international Biodiversity Information Standards (TDWG) organization, formerly the International Working Group on Taxonomic Databases. The WGSRPD standards, like other standards for data fields in botanical databases, were developed to promote "the wider and more effective dissemination of information about the world's heritage of biological organisms for the benefit of the world at large". The system provides clear definitions and codes for recording plant distributions at four scales or levels, from "botanical continents" down to parts of large countries. The following countries are included in their classification of "northern Europe":

- Denmark
- Finland
- Iceland
- Ireland
- Norway
- Sweden
- United Kingdom

as well as the dependent areas:

- Åland
- Faroe Islands
- Isle of Man
- Jan Mayen
- Svalbard

== Demographics ==
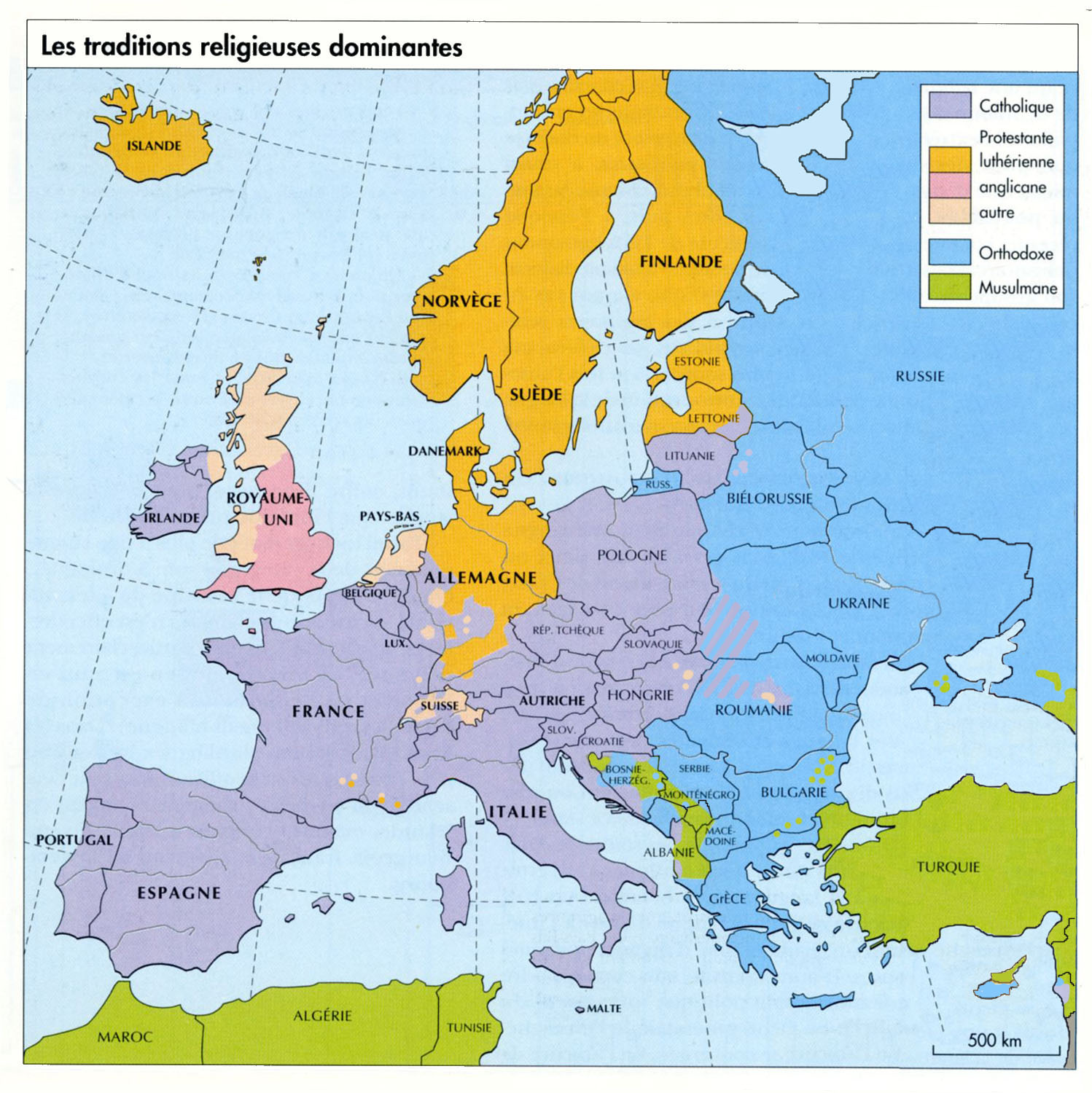
Map of Europe showing the largest religions by region. Islam is represented in green, Eastern Orthodox Christianity in blue, Roman Catholicism in purple, and the other colors represent branches of Protestantism.

Countries in northern Europe generally have developed economies and some of the highest standards of living in the world. They often score highly on surveys measuring quality of life, such as the Human Development Index. Aside from the United Kingdom, they generally have a small population relative to their size, most of whom live in cities. The quality of education in much of Northern Europe is rated highly in international rankings, with Estonia and Finland topping the list among the OECD countries in Europe.

=== Language ===
Germanic languages are widely spoken in northern Europe with North Germanic languages being the most common first language in the Faroe Islands (Faroese), Iceland (Icelandic), Denmark (Danish), Norway (Norwegian) and Sweden (Swedish). The West Germanic language English is the most common first language in Jersey, Guernsey, the Isle of Man, the United Kingdom and Ireland, however, the West Germanic language Scots is also spoken as a minority language in parts of Scotland and Ireland. Beyond this, the Finnic languages of Finnish and Estonian are the most common first languages of Finland and Estonia respectively. The Baltic languages of Lithuanian and Latvian are the most common first languages of Lithuania and Latvia respectively. A number of Celtic languages are spoken in the British Isles including the Brythonic Welsh and the Goidelic Scots Gaelic and Irish. The Celtic languages Cornish and Manx have been revived since becoming classed as extinct, being now spoken to a limited extent in Cornwall and the Isle of Man respectively. The Norman languages of Jèrriais and Guernésiais are spoken in Jersey and Guernsey, though are listed as endangered due to the increasing prominence of English in the islands.

While not the most common first languages in any country, Sámi languages such as North Sámi, Lule Sámi and South Sámi are spoken in the transnational region of Sápmi and are listed as endangered.

=== Religion ===
During the Early Middle Ages, the Roman Catholic Church expanded into northern Europe and spread Christianity among the Germanic peoples. Christianity reached the peoples of Scandinavia and the Baltic region in later centuries. The Latin alphabet along with the influence of Western Christianity spread northward from Rome, leading to written English, German, Dutch, Danish, Swedish, Norwegian, Icelandic, Irish, Scottish, Welsh, Lithuanian, Latvian, Estonian, Finnish and Sámi languages. The Sámi were the last peoples to be converted in the 18th century.

== Regional cooperation ==
The Russian White Sea–Baltic Canal, connecting eastern Baltic Europe to the Arctic

The Hansa group in the European Union comprises most of the northern European states, plus the Netherlands.

The melting of the Arctic is likely to create new possibilities and issues involving collaboration in the region.

== See also ==
- Archaeology of Northern Europe
- Arctic Circle
- Arctic Council
- Baltic Assembly
- Baltic Council of Ministers
- Baltoscandia
- British–Irish Council
- British–Irish Parliamentary Assembly
- Celtic nations
- Central Europe
- Common Travel Area
- Council of the Baltic Sea States
- Crown Dependencies
- European Free Trade Association
- Euroregion Baltic
- Joint Expeditionary Force
- List of Intangible Cultural Heritage elements in Northern Europe
- List of World Heritage Sites in Northern Europe
- New Hanseatic League
- Nordic-Baltic Eight
- Nordic Battlegroup
- Nordic Council
- Nordic cross flag
- Nordic Estonia
- Nordic model
- Nordic Passport Union
- North Sea Region
- Northern Dimension
- Northern European Gymnastics Championships
- Northern Future Forum
- Northwestern Europe
- OTSEM
- Roadex Project
- Southern Europe
- Synchronous grid of Northern Europe
- Vifanord
