= Carl Clemen =

German theologian and religious historian

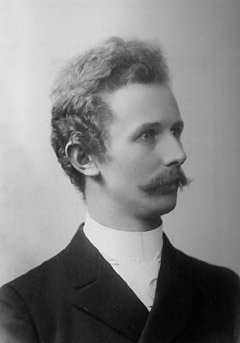
Carl Clemen

Carl Christian Clemen (30 March 1865, near Leipzig – 8 July 1940, Bonn), best known as Carl Clemen, was a German theologian and religious historian. He was a member of the history of religions school.

== Career ==
Clemen was Professor of New Testament and religious history at the University of Bonn. He was a critic of the Christ myth theory and refuted the arguments of Arthur Drews, Peter Jensen and other mythicists. He was also critical of the ideas of Anthroposophy and Theosophy.

Clemen has approximately six hundred publications. His brothers were art historian Paul Clemen and historian Otto Clemen.

== Selected publications ==
Books

- Die religionsgeschichtliche Methode in der Theologie (1904)
- Paulus: Sein Leben und Wirken (1904)
- Religionsgeschichtliche Erklärung des Neuen Testaments (1909)
- Die entstehung des Johannesevangeliums (1912)
- Primitive Christianity and Its Non-Jewish Sources (1912)
- Der Einfluss der Mysterienreligionen auf das älteste Christentum (1913)
- Mysterienreligionen auf das älteste Christentum (1913)
- Die griechischen und lateinischen Nachrichten über die persische Religion (1920)
- Religionsgeschichtliche Erklärung (1924)
- Die Anwendung der Psychoanalyse auf Mythologie und Religionsgeschichte (1928)
- Religions of the World: Their Nature and Their History (1931)
- Die Religion der Etrusker (1936)

Papers

- Clemen, Carl. (1905). Josephus and Christianity. The Biblical World 25 (5): 361–375.
- Clemen, Carl. (1908). Does the Fourth Gospel Depend Upon Pagan Traditions? The American Journal of Theology 12 (4): 529–546.
- Clemen, Carl. (1909). The Revelation of John. The Biblical World 34 (2): 91–103.
- Clemen, Carl. (1916). Buddhistic Influence in the New Testament. The American Journal of Theology 20 (4): 536–548.
