= Robert E. Norton =

American historian

Robert Edward Norton (born October 27, 1960) is an American cultural and intellectual historian specializing in European thought and culture from the Enlightenment through the early twentieth century. He is a professor at the University of Notre Dame with concurrent appointments in the departments of German, History, and Philosophy and is known for his interdisciplinary research on aesthetics, ethics, political thought, and the intellectual roots of modern German culture.

== Early life and education ==
Norton earned a B.A. in German Language and Literature from the University of California, Santa Barbara in 1982. He continued his studies at Princeton University, where he received an M.A. in 1985 and a PhD in 1988. During his doctoral training, he also studied at the Georg-August-Universität Göttingen and the Freie Universität Berlin, experiences that shaped his scholarly focus on German intellectual history.

== Career ==
Robert E. Norton has held academic appointments in German studies, history, and philosophy in the United States and Germany. Since 1998, he has been a professor at University of Notre Dame, where he also serves as Concurrent Professor of History (since 2019) and Concurrent Professor of Philosophy (since 2009).

He previously taught at Vassar College and at Mount Holyoke College, and he was a guest professor at the University of Chicago and the Ruprecht-Karls-Universität Heidelberg.

From 2009 to 2011, Norton served as President of the International Herder Society.

He was Editor of The German Quarterly from 2012 to 2015, and sits on the editorial boards of several international journals in intellectual and cultural history.

Between 2014 and 2016, he was a member of the board of directors of the American Friends of the Alexander von Humboldt Foundation and has participated in selection committees for the Deutsche Forschungsgemeinschaft/DFG (German Research Foundation).

== Awards ==
Norton received a fellowship in 1997 from the John Simon Guggenheim Memorial Foundation, and in 2003 he was awarded the Jacques Barzun Prize in Cultural History by the American Philosophical Society for Secret Germany. In 2011, his translation of Nietzsche. Attempt at a Mythology won the Ungar German Translation Award, which is administered by the American Translators Association.

In 2018, Norton was awarded a senior fellowship from the Forschungsbund Marbach Weimar Wolfenbüttel, during which he conducted research in Weimar.

In 2019, he received a senior fellowship at the Interdisciplinary Center for Enlightenment Studies at Martin Luther University Halle-Wittenberg.

In 2024, Norton was honored with the College of Arts & Letters Research Achievement Award at the University of Notre Dame for his transformative impact on German intellectual history, particularly his ability to uncover overlooked intellectual currents and reinterpret major cultural phenomena.

== Research and scholarly contributions ==
Norton's scholarship focuses on German intellectual and cultural history from the Enlightenment to the twentieth century, combining close archival research with conceptual analysis of aesthetics, political thought, and the history of ideas. A central contribution of his work is the reinterpretation of Johann Gottfried Herder as a major participant in Enlightenment culture rather than as an opponent of it—an argument that has had a lasting influence on modern Herder scholarship and on broader interpretations of eighteenth-century European thought.

Norton has also reshaped the study of German modernity through his research on literary and intellectual circles, most notably in his analysis of Stefan George and his cultural network, and through his work on political and religious thought in modern Germany, including a major reappraisal of Ernst Troeltsch and the intellectual origins of German democracy during the First World War. More broadly, his studies demonstrate how aesthetic theory, moral philosophy, and historical interpretation shaped political culture in Germany from the Enlightenment through the Weimar period.

His books include Herder's Aesthetics and the European Enlightenment (1991), The Beautiful Soul: Aesthetic Morality in the Eighteenth Century (1995), Secret Germany: Stefan George and His Circle (2002), and The Crucible of German Democracy: Ernst Troeltsch and the First World War (2021).

In addition to monographs, Norton has published widely on major figures of German and European thought, including Johann Christoph Gottsched, Gotthold Ephraim Lessing, Friedrich Schiller, Johann Wolfgang von Goethe, and Isaiah Berlin, addressing themes such as language and meaning, secularization, aesthetics, and the cultural foundations of political modernity.

Norton has also made significant contributions as a translator of German intellectual history, notably through his English translation of Ernst Bertram’s Nietzsche: Attempt at a Mythology and Ulrich Ricken's Linguistics, Anthropology, and Philosophy in the French Enlightenment, thereby broadening access to key continental scholarship for English-speaking audiences.

== Major publications ==
- The Crucible of German Democracy. Ernst Troeltsch and the First World War. (Mohr Siebeck, 2021). ISBN 978-3-16-159828-9.
- Secret Germany. Stefan George and His Circle. (Cornell UP, 2002). ISBN 978-0801433542.
- The Beautiful Soul. Aesthetic Morality in the Eighteenth Century. (Cornell UP, 1995). ISBN 978-0801430503.
- Herder's Aesthetics and the European Enlightenment. (Cornell UP, 1991). ISBN 978-0801425301.
- Translation of Ernst Bertram, Nietzsche. Attempt at a Mythology. (Illinois UP, 2009). ISBN 978-0252076015.
- Translation of Ulrich Ricken, Linguistics, Anthropology and Philosophy in the French Enlightenment (Routledge, 1994) ISBN 9780203219799.
