= Jacob L. Wright =

American educator and scholar

Jacob L. Wright is an American biblical scholar currently serving as professor of Hebrew Bible at Emory University. Prior to his Emory appointment, Wright taught at the University of Heidelberg (Germany), one of the foremost research-oriented public universities in Europe, for several years. His areas of expertise include Biblical Archaeology, warfare in the Ancient Near East, and the literary and redaction history of the Hebrew Bible canon. He has published extensively throughout his career, authoring several books and dozens of articles which span topics such as Ezra-Nehemiah, the Persian period, warfare in the Ancient Near East; as well as the material culture of the ancient Levant, the unique role of women in the Hebrew Bible, and larger themes such as defeat, peoplehood, and national identity in the Hebrew Bible. Areas of concentration in war studies include war commemoration, urbicide and ritual violence, and feasting and gift-giving.

== Background ==
After receiving his BA with honors at UMKC in 1996, majoring in history and Jewish Studies, with a minor in philosophy, Wright then matriculated at the University of Göttingen. During that time, Wright was also part of several research groups, including one collating the Cairo Geniza fragments of Avot de Rabbi Nathan, and another on early Jewish prayers in their narrative contexts, which was the first group in theology to receive the Emmy Noether Grant from the German Research Foundation. He wrote his dissertation under Reinhard Gregor Kratz as his first doctoral student.

After being granted a Doctor Theologiae from Göttingen in 2003, he worked as part of the editorial team for De Gruyter in Berlin preparing an exhaustive list of lemmata for the Encyclopedia of the Bible and Its Reception History. In 2004, he was hired as Jan Gertz's first assistant in his chair at the University of Heidelberg where he taught courses, began an Habilitation, and participated for several seasons at the Ramat Rachel Excavations with Oded Lipschits and Manfred Oeming. In 2007, he took a position at Emory University as assistant professor of Hebrew Bible, later earning tenure and being promoted to associate professor in 2012.

== Academic career ==
Wright's first monograph, The Nehemiah Memoir and Its Earliest Readers (2005), builds on an approach from Kratz, arguing that while Nehemiah's first-person account goes back to an early account written by Nehemiah himself (or a commissioned scribe), later generations greatly expanded it (above all, with the reform accounts in chapters 5 and 13). He also contends that the critique of the priesthood (and other members of the aristocracy) in these passages provoked the composition of the larger book of Ezra-Nehemiah: first the building account in Ezra 1-6 (without the letter to Artaxerxes that specifically polemicized against the wall project), then the Ezra first-person travel account in Ezra 7–8, and finally the marriage reforms and the formation of "a people of the book" in Nehemiah 8–10. Beyond its historical implications, the book attends to diachronic method throughout, seeking to bridge the gap between final-form readings of Tamara Cohn Eskenazi and the source-based approach that Baruch Spinoza first introduced to the study of Ezra-Nehemiah. In addition, Wright has written many articles on the Persian Period and Ezra-Nehemiah along with short commentaries on the book.

In 2014, Wright launched a MOOC on Coursera entitled The Bible's Prehistory, Purpose, and Political Future, to a worldwide audience of learners. The number of students who enrolled since its launch stands at more than 60,000. In this course, he draws from archaeology, the historiographical approach of longue durée, and redaction criticism to put forth a new paradigm for understanding the impetus of the formation of the canon of the Hebrew Bible. His thesis is that the Bible is a project of peoplehood, a collection of disparate oral traditions, laws, and religious texts drawn together as a way to create a national identity for a diasporic post-exilic people, grappling with a catastrophic defeat. This thesis builds upon the current European trend within scholarship to date the composition of biblical texts from after the exile in 587 BCE, with some supplements even as late as the Persian or Hellenistic period.

Wright's monograph War, Memory, and National Identity in the Hebrew Bible, (published in OpenAccess format), is a technical exploration of the themes of national identity, peoplehood, and belonging. He asserts that the collective memories of peoplehood are shaped through war and conflict, and that any peoplehood thinking must be political (contrary to the position espoused by the German scholar Julius Wellhausen). He uses in particular the diachronic method to illustrate how various local tribes and people groups negotiated their belonging to ancient Israel through war service, and commemoration of their participation in various regional battles. The texts he examines are largely from the books of Joshua and Judges, where he gives considerable space to highlighting important women in the Bible, among whom are Rahab, whose tale epitomizes the archetypical outsider; and figures like Deborah and Jael for their significance in subverting male power.

His 2023 book, Why the Bible Began: An Alternative History of Scripture and its Origins, contends that the Bible came together over several centuries by scribes grappling with the defeat of the Israelite kingdoms by regional empires, and who sought to sustain a stateless nation through enduring texts that combine their collective traditions, laws, and ethics.

== Publications ==
=== Books ===
- Why the Bible Began: An Alternative History of Scripture and its Origins. Cambridge University Press, 2023.
- War, Memory, and National Identity in the Hebrew Bible. Cambridge University Press, 2020.
- David, King of Israel, and Caleb in Biblical Memory, Cambridge University Press, 2014.
- King David and His Reign Revisited, Aldina Media (enhanced iBook version on Apple iBooks), 2013
- The Nehemiah-Memoir and its Earliest Readers. BZAW 348. Berlin/New York: De Gruyter, 2004

=== Edited volumes ===
- Supplementation and the Study of the Hebrew Bible. With Saul Olyan. Brown University Press/SBL Press, 2018.
- The History of Judah in the Eighth Century BCE: A Comprehensive Approach. With Zev Farber. Atlanta: SBL Press, 2018.
- Rituals of War in the Bible and the Ancient Near East. With Brad Kelle and Frank Ames. Atlanta: SBL Press, 2014.
- Making a Difference: Essays in Honor of Tamara Cohn Eskenazi. With David Clines and Kent Richards. Sheffield: Sheffield Phoenix Press, 2012.
- Interpreting Exile: Interdisciplinary Studies of Displacement and Deportation in Biblical and Modern Contexts. With Brad Kelle and Frank Ames. Atlanta: SBL Press, 2011.

=== Articles ===
- "Projectile Weapon Points," (with Sean Dugaw) in Oded Lipschits, Ramat Rahel Reports, 2021.
- "Rahab: Between Faith and Works," The Bible and Interpretation, 2020
- "Gender-Bending Performances in Wartime: From Judges to Judith," Ancient Near East Today, 2020.
- "Chariots: Technological Developments from the 3rd Millennium BCE to the Hellenistic Age," in Angelika Berlejung, Michelle Daviau, Jens Kamlah, Gunnar Lehman, Encyclopedia of the Material Culture of the Biblical World, Tübingen: Mohr Siebeck, 2021.
- "Society and Politics: Banquet and Gift Exchange," in Bruno Jacobs and Robert Rollinger, A Companion to the Achaemenid Persian Empire, Two Volumes, London: Wiley-Blackwell, 2020.
- "The Savior of Gibeon" (with Zev Farber), in Christoph Berner and Harald Samuel, Book Seams in the Hexateuch I, Tübingen: Mohr Siebeck, 2018.
- "The Composition of the Gideon Narrative," in Saul Olyan and Jacob Wright, Supplementary Approaches to the Hebrew Bible, Brown Judaic Studies, Atlanta: SBL Press, 2018.
- "Zum Buch Numeri/Bemidbar," in Walter Homolka, Hanna Liss, Rüdiger Liwak, Tora: Die Neu-Edition der Tora in der Übersetzung Ludwig Philippsons, Berlin: Herder, 2015.
- "Rahab's Valor and the Gibeonites' Cowardice," in Tracy Lemos, Saul Olyan, and John Collins, Women, Worship, and War. Essays in Honor of Susan Niditch, Brown Judaic Studies, 2015.
- "Urbicide in the Ancient Near East: A New Approach to the Destruction of Memory," in Saul Olyan, Ritual Violence in the Hebrew Bible: New Perspectives, New York: Oxford University Press, 2015.
- "War and Peace in the Bible," in Adele Berlin and Marc Zvi Brettler, The Jewish Study Bible, second revised edition, New York: Oxford University Press, 2014.
- "Commensality and Political Consolidation" (with Michael Chan) in Daniel Master, The Oxford Encyclopedia of the Bible and Archeology, New York: Oxford University Press, 2014.
- "Prophets, Kings, and Gewaltmonopol in the Ancient Near East," in Thomas Römer and Jean-Marie Durand, Comment devient-on prophète?, Fribourg: OBO, 2013.
- "Between Nation and State in the Book of Samuel: Ittai the Gittite," in David Clines, Kent Richards, and Jacob L. Wright, Making a Difference, Sheffield: Sheffield Phoenix Press, 2012.
- "Die Zerstörung der Umwelt im Krieg," in Angelika Berlejung, Disaster and Relief Management, FAT 81; Tübingen: Mohr Siebeck, 2012.
- "King and Eunuch: A Study of Self-Preservation (Isa 56:3-5)" (with Michael Chan), Journal of Biblical Literature 131 (2012).
- "The Deportation of Jerusalem's Wealth and the Demise of Native Sovereignty in the Book of Kings," in Brad Kelle, Frank Ames, and Jacob L. Wright, Interpreting Exile: Interdisciplinary Studies of Displacement and Deportation in Biblical and Modern Contexts, Atlanta: SBL Press, 2011.
- "Making a Name for Oneself: Martial Valor, Heroic Death and Procreation in the Hebrew Bible," Journal for the Study of the Old Testament 35 (2011).
- "Deborah's War Memorial: The Composition of Judges 4-5 and the Politics of War Commemoration," Zeitschrift für die Alttestamentliche Wissenschaft 123 (2011).
- "'Human, All Too Human' – Royal Name-Making in Wartime," in Yigal Levin and Amnon Shapira, War and Peace in Jewish Tradition: From the Ancient World to the Present, London: Routledge, 2011.
- "War Commemoration and the Interpretation of Judges 5:15b-17," Vetus Testamentum 61 (2011).
- היהודי העם של העגומה הראשית, Techelet 42 (2011).
- "Surviving in an Imperial Context: Foreign Military Service and Judean Identity," in Oded Lipschits, Gary N. Knoppers and Manfred Oeming, Judah and the Judeans in the Achaemenid Period: Negotiating Identity in an International Context, Winona Lake, Indiana: Eisenbrauns, 2011.
- "Remember Nehemiah: 1 Esdras and the Damnatio Memoriae Nehemiae," in Lisbeth Fried, Was 1 Esdras First? Atlanta: SBL Press, 2011.
- "A Nation Conceived in Defeat," Azure 42 (2010).
- "Continuing These Conversations," in Louis Jonker, Historiography and Identity Reformulation in Second Temple Literature, London: T&T Clark, 2010.
- "Commensal Politics in Ancient Western Asia, Part II," Zeitschrift für die Alttestamentliche Wissen-schaft 122 (2010).
- "Commensal Politics in Ancient Western Asia, Part I," Zeitschrift für die Alttestamentliche Wissen-schaft 122 (2010).
- "Ezra," in Beverly Roberts Gaventa and David Petersen, New Interpreter's Bible One Volume Commentary, Nashville: Abingdon Press, 2010.
- "Nehemiah," in Edited by Beverly Roberts Gaventa and David Petersen, New Interpreter's Bible One Volume Commentary, Nashville: Abingdon Press, 2010.
- "The Commemoration of Defeat and the Formation of a Nation in the Hebrew Bible," Prooftexts 29 (2009).
- "War, Ideas of." Katherine Doob Sakenfeld et al., NIB Dictionary of the Bible, Nashville: Abingdon, 2009.
- "Seeking - Finding – Writing," in Mark J. Boda and Paul L. Redditt, Unity and Disunity in Ezra-Nehemiah: Redaction, Rhetoric and Reader, Sheffield: Sheffield Phoenix Press, 2008.
- "Military Valor and Kingship: A Book-Oriented Approach to the Study of a Major War Theme," in Brad E. Kelle and Frank Ritchel Ames, Writing and Reading War: Rhetoric, Gender, and Ethics in Biblical and Modern Contexts, Atlanta: SBL Press, 2008.
- "War and Wanton Destruction: A Case Against Anti-Assyrian Polemics in Deuteronomy," Journal of Biblical Literature 127 (2008).
- "Writing the Restoration: Ezra as Meritocratic Icon in the Post-Destruction Period", Journal of Hebrew Scriptures 7 (2007).
- "Looking Back at Rebuilding Identity," Journal of Hebrew Scriptures 7 (2007): 28–36.

== Awards and recognition ==
- PROSE Award in the Theology and Religious Studies Category, 2024
- Publishers Weekly Best Five Books on Religion, 2023
- The New Yorker's Best Books of 2023
- Andrew W. Mellon Grant for Publication of Monograph in Open Access Format, 2019
- Fellow at the Herzl Institute in Jerusalem (Templeton Foundation), 2015–2017
- National Endowment for the Humanities Faculty Fellowship, 2011–12
- Grant from the Memorial Foundation for Jewish Culture (New York), 2009–10
- University Research Grant, 2009–10
- Sir John Templeton Award for Theological Promise (largest prize for first books in religion), 2008
- Faculty of Distinction, Emory University, 2007–2010
- Emmy Noether Grant (shared with 3 others) for the interdisciplinary project "Early Christian Prayer and Its Jewish Origins," 2000–2002
- Honors Award from UMKC for highest GPA in the Humanities, 1996.
