= Heinrich Weinel =

German Protestant theologian

Heinrich Weinel (28 April 1874, Vonhausen – 29 September 1936, Jena) was a German Protestant theologian.

== Biography ==
He studied at the universities of Berlin and Giessen, and in 1900 became an inspector of evangelical-theological seminaries in Bonn. From 1904 he was an associate professor at the University of Jena, where in 1907 he became a full professor of New Testament studies. Beginning in 1926 he taught classes in systematic theology at Jena. He was co-founder of the Freien Volkskirche, whose magazine he published from 1919.

During his career, he labored for a popularization of liberal Protestant theology. In his numerous works, Weinel wrote on the history and theology of early Christianity from a "history of religions" perspective.

== Selected works ==
- Mašaḥ und seine Derivate; linguistisch-archäologische Studie, 1898 – Mashaḥ and its derivatives: a linguistic-archaeological study.
- Die Wirkungen des Geistes und die Geister im nachapostolischen Zeitalter bis auf Irenäus, 1899 – The effects of the mind and the spirits in the post-Apostolic period down to Irenaeus.
- Jesus im neunzehnten Jahrhundert, 1903; translated into English by Alban G. Widgery and published as "Jesus in the nineteenth century and after" (1914)
- Paulus: der Mensch und sein Werk : Die Anfänge des Christentums, der Kirche und des Dogmas, 1904; translated into English by Rev. G. A. Bienemann and edited by Rev. W. D. Morrison, and published as "St. Paul, the man and his work" (1906).
- Ibsen, Björnson, Nietzsche : Individualismus und Christentum, 1908 – Henrik Ibsen, Bjørnstjerne Bjørnson, Friedrich Nietzsche; Individualism and Christianity.
- Biblische Theologie des Neuen Testaments : die Religion Jesu und des Urchristentums, 1913 – Biblical theology of the New Testament, the religion of Jesus and early Christianity.
- Die Gleichnisse Jesu. Zugleich eine Anleitung zu einem quellenmäßigen Verständnis der Evangelien, third edition (1910) – The parables of Jesus.
