= Paul Clemen =

German art historian (1866–1947)

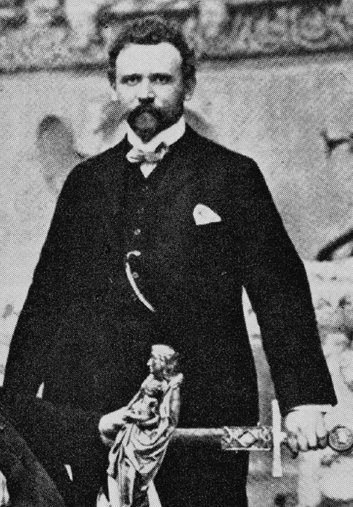
Paul Clemen.

Paul Clemen (31 October 1866 – 8 July 1947) was a German art historian known in particular for his large inventory of monuments in the Rhineland area, many of which were destroyed or severely damaged in World War II.

Clemen was born in Leipzig, son of Professor Christian August Julius Clemen (1838–1920) and his wife Helene Voigt (1842–1907). His two brothers Carl and Otto became prominent scholars in their own right in the fields of comparative religion and history, respectively.

He studied at the universities of Strassburg (now Strasbourg), where he was awarded his doctorate in 1889 for a dissertation on the portraits of Charlemagne (Porträtdarstellungen Karls des Grossen) and Bonn, where, in 1893, he received his habilitation. He was appointed provinzialkonservator in the Rhine Province in the same year, in which capacity he became responsible for conservation and documentation of the monuments in the province. He became extraordinary professor of art history in Bonn in 1898 and professor of the History of Art and Literature at the Düsseldorf Academy of Arts in 1899. In 1902, he was appointed professor (ordinarius) of art history in Bonn, a position he held until his retirement in 1936. In Bonn, his students included Heinrich Lützeler and Carl Nordenfalk. He served as guest professor at Harvard University during 1907–1908.

Clemen's earliest publications on medieval art impressed the authorities of the province enough to make him responsible for the inventory of the monuments of the province. He began, in 1891, the publication of the series Die Kunstdenkmäler der Rheinprovinz (Monuments of the Rhine Province), for which he served as editor for the next 46 years. The project culminated in 1937 with the publication of the volume on the Cologne Cathedral, Der Dom zu Köln, a collaboration with Heinrich Neu and Fritz Witte, but with Clemen as main author.

During World War I, Clemen was head of the art commission for the German occupation force in Belgium. An obituary of Clemen published in an American journal noted that "far from despoiling the occupied country of its art objects this commission saw its purpose in the cataloguing and photographing of Belgian monuments." His work during the war years resulted both in a book on the subject, Kunstschutz im Kriege (in English translation as Protection of Art During the War, both 1919), and in the two-volume Belgische Kunstdenkmäler (Munich 1923).

Many of the monuments Clemen had dedicated himself to protect, including several of the medieval churches in Cologne, were destroyed during World War II, and his house was destroyed by air bombardment in 1944, along with his library and a manuscript for a large treatment of the history of the art of the Rhineland.
