= Paul Wernle =

Swiss theologian (1872-1939)

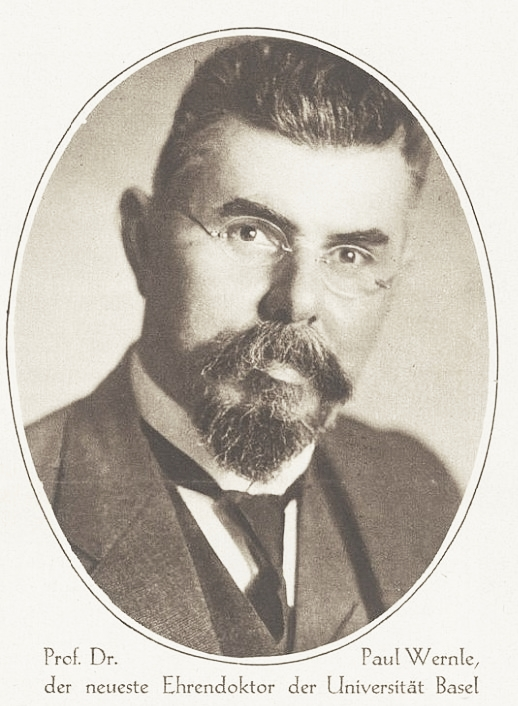
Paul Wernle (1872-1939) Protestant theologian

Paul Wernle (1 May 1872 – 11 April 1939) was a Swiss theologian, born in Hottingen, today part of the city of Zürich.

He studied at the Universities of Basel, Berlin and Göttingen. At Basel he was a student of Bernhard Duhm (1847-1928), and in Göttingen was influenced by Wilhelm Bousset (1865-1920). In 1900 he became an associate professor at Basel, where in 1905 he was appointed a full professor of New Testament Studies. During the course of his career he also taught classes in dogmatics and church history.

Wernle was a representative of the Religionsgeschichtliche Schule (history of religions school). His expertise was in the field of New Testament analysis, and he is largely remembered for his work involving Synoptic and Pauline research.

He died in Basel.

== Selected publications ==
- Paulus als Heidenmissionar (Paul as Missionary to the Gentiles), 1899
- Die Anfänge unserer Religion (Beginnings of Our Religion), 1901
- Die Quellen des Lebens Jesu. Mohr (The Sources of the Life of Jesus), 1906
- Lessing und das Christentum (Lessing and Christianity), 1912
- Der schweizerische Protestantismus im 18. Jahrhundert, 1923-1925
- Der schweizerische Protestantismus in der Zeit der Helvetik 1798-1803 (Swiss Protestantism in the Years 1798-1803), 1938–42
