= Joachim Begrich =

German theologian

- Born: June 13, 1900; Predel, Saxony-Anhalt, German Empire
- Died: April 26, 1945 (aged 44); Dussoi, near Belluno, Italy
- Education: University of Leipzig; University of Halle
- Occupations: Biblical scholar, theologian
- Years active: 1926–1945
- Spouse: Daughter of Hermann Gunkel
- Theological work
- Era: 20th-century
- Tradition or movement: Form criticism
- Main interests: Old Testament, Assyriology, Biblical Chronology

Joachim Begrich (13 June 1900 – 26 April 1945) was a German biblical scholar and theologian born in Predel, a hamlet now belonging to Elsteraue in the state of Saxony-Anhalt. He was the son of a pastor and the son-in-law of Old Testament scholar Hermann Gunkel (1862–1932).

He studied philology, Assyriology and theology at the University of Leipzig, then transferred to Halle, where he focused his studies on theology. In 1923/24 he attended the seminary in Stettin, earning his doctorate at Halle in 1926. In 1930 he was appointed associate professor of Old Testament studies at the University of Leipzig. During World War II he served as a paramedic, and lost his life in Dussoi, near Belluno, Italy less than two weeks prior to the end of hostilities in Europe.

Begrich was the author of a scholarly work on the chronology of the kings of Israel and Judah called Die Chronologie der Könige von Israel und Juda (1929), and a book on "Deutero-Isaiah" titled Studien zu Deuterojesaja (1938). He also assisted Hermann Gunkel with the latter's Einleitung in die Psalmen, later translated into English and published with the title Introduction to Psalms : the genres of the religious lyric of Israel. Two of his most memorable essays are on the priestly oracle of salvation/deliverance and the priestly Torah; these appear in his Gesammelte Studien.

== Bibliography ==
- Der Psalm des Hiskia: Ein Beitrag zum Verständnis von Jesaja 38, 10-20. Forschungen zur Religion und Literatur des Alten und Neuen Testaments 25. Göttingen: Vandenhoeck & Ruprecht. 1926.
- Die Chronologie der Könige von Israel und Juda und die Quellen des Rahmens der Königsbücher. Beiträge zur historischen Theologie 3. Tübingen: Mohr/Siebeck. 1929.
- Studien zu Deuterojesaja. Beiträge zur Wissenschaft vom Alten und Neuen Testament 25. Stuttgart: Kohlhammer. 1938.
- Gesammelte Studien zum Alten Testament. Theologische Bücherei 21. Edited by Walther Zimmerli. Munich: Kaiser. 1964.
