= Reinhard Gregor Kratz =

German theologian

Reinhard Gregor Kratz, FBA (born July 25, 1957 in Offenbach am Main) is a German biblical scholar, historian of ancient Judaism, and Protestant theologian. He currently serves as professor of Old Testament, or Hebrew Bible, in the Faculty of Theology at the University of Göttingen, in Germany. In his various authorial, editorial, advisory, and administrative capacities, Kratz has had a sizeable impact on research into the Hebrew Bible and ancient Judaism.

== Life ==
After studies in theology and classics at the universities in Frankfurt, Heidelberg, and Zürich (1977–82), Kratz became scientific assistant to Old Testament professor Odil Hannes Steck in Zürich (1982–86). Following a requisite internship (Vikariat) in the Evangelical-Reformed Church of the Canton of Zürich, he was then ordained as Verbi Divini Minister, in 1987. That same year, Kratz earned his doctor of theology with a dissertation on the Aramaic portions of the book of Daniel, and three years later, in 1990, he secured habilitation for his work Kyros im Deuterojesajabuch. While serving as Privatdozent in Zürich, from 1991 to 1995, he obtained fellowships from the Deutsches Evangelisches Institut für Altertumswissenschaft des Heiligen Landes and the Heisenberg-Programm. Since 1995, Kratz has held a chair in Old Testament Studies at the University of Göttingen.

== Academic honors ==
In 1999, Kratz became a member of the Göttingen Academy of Sciences and Humanities. During the 2002–03 academic year, he was fellow at the Institute for Advanced Study in Berlin. Kratz also spent 2006–07 as Fowler Hamilton Visiting Research Fellow at Christ Church College, University of Oxford, and 2014–15 as Overseas Visiting Scholar at St. John's College, University of Cambridge. In 2015, he was appointed honorary member of the British Society for the Old Testament.

He has declined professorships at the University of Kiel (1995), University of Heidelberg (2003), Humboldt University of Berlin (2008), and University of Oxford, as Oriel and Laing Professor of the Interpretation of Holy Scripture (2014).

== Areas of expertise ==
Kratz's work concentrates on the literary and redaction history of the Old Testament. With such research, he has revitalized an historical account of the Old Testament literature that traces back to Julius Wellhausen—Wellhausen himself having furthered theses already advanced by such figures as Wilhelm Vatke, Eduard Reuss, Karl Heinrich Graf, and Abraham Kuenen. Kratz has also devoted considerable attention to ancient Near Eastern and Old Testament prophecy. Recently, however, he has focused more and more on the history of Judaism in the Persian and Hellenistic periods, especially in its manifestation at the communities of Elephantine and Qumran.

== Professional activities ==
A member of the Göttingen Academy of Sciences and Humanities, Kratz currently serves as chairman of the board for the Academy's Septuaginta Unternehmen and director of its longterm lexicon project Hebräisches und aramäisches Lexikon über die Texte vom Toten Meer. He also directs the Division for Qumran Research at the Institute for Special Research, located at Göttingen's Faculty of Theology, and the Centrum Orbis Orientalis (CORO), an interdisciplinary center supported by the university as well as the academy. In addition, he acted as vice-speaker for the German Research Foundation Research Training Group (Graduiertenkolleg) 896 "Concepts of the Divine – Concepts of the World" and co-organizer for the joint project "The Interpretation of the Book of Genesis in the Dead Sea Scrolls," funded by the Deutsche Forschungsgemeinschaft in cooperation with the Deborah Dimant of the University of Haifa. Kratz sits on a number of editorial boards, for series and journals alike, and on the steering committee for the Northern European research network Old Testament Studies: Epistemologies and Methods (OTSEM). For many of these activities, Kratz works closely with his Göttingen Old Testament colleague, Hermann Spieckermann.

== Select publications ==
- Translatio imperii. Untersuchungen zu den aramäischen Danielerzählungen und ihrem theologiegeschichtlichen Umfeld ("Wissenschaftliche Monographien zum Alten und Neuen Testament"; 63). Neukirchener Verlag, Neukirchen-Vluyn 1991, ISBN 3-7887-1322-4 (zugl. Dissertation, Universität Zürich 1987).
- Kyros im Deuterojesaja-Buch. Redaktionsgeschichtliche Untersuchungen zu Entstehung und Theologie von Jes 40-55 ("Forschungen zum Alten Testament"; 1). Mohr, Tübingen 1991, ISBN 3-1614-5757-9 (zugl. Habilitation, Universität Zürich 1990).
- Die Komposition der erzählenden Bücher des Alten Testaments. Grundwissen der Bibelkritik (UTB; 2157). Vandenhoeck & Ruprecht, Göttingen 2000, ISBN 3-8252-2157-1. [English Translation: The Composition of the Narrative Books of the Old Testament. Translated by John Bowden. London: T&T Clark, 2005]
- Die Propheten Israels (Beck'sche Reihe Wissen; 2326). Beck, München 2003, ISBN 3-406-48026-8. [English Translation: The Prophets of Israel. Translated by Anselm Hagedorn and Nathan MacDonald. Critical Studies in the Hebrew Bible 2. Winona Lake: Eisenbrauns, 2015]
- Historisches und biblisches Israel. Drei Überblicke zum Alten Testament. Tübingen: Mohr Siebeck, 2013 [English Translation: Historical and Biblical Israel: The History, Tradition, and Archives of Israel and Judah. Translated by Paul Michael Kurtz. Oxford: Oxford University Press, 2015]
