= Carl Mirbt =

German Protestant church historian

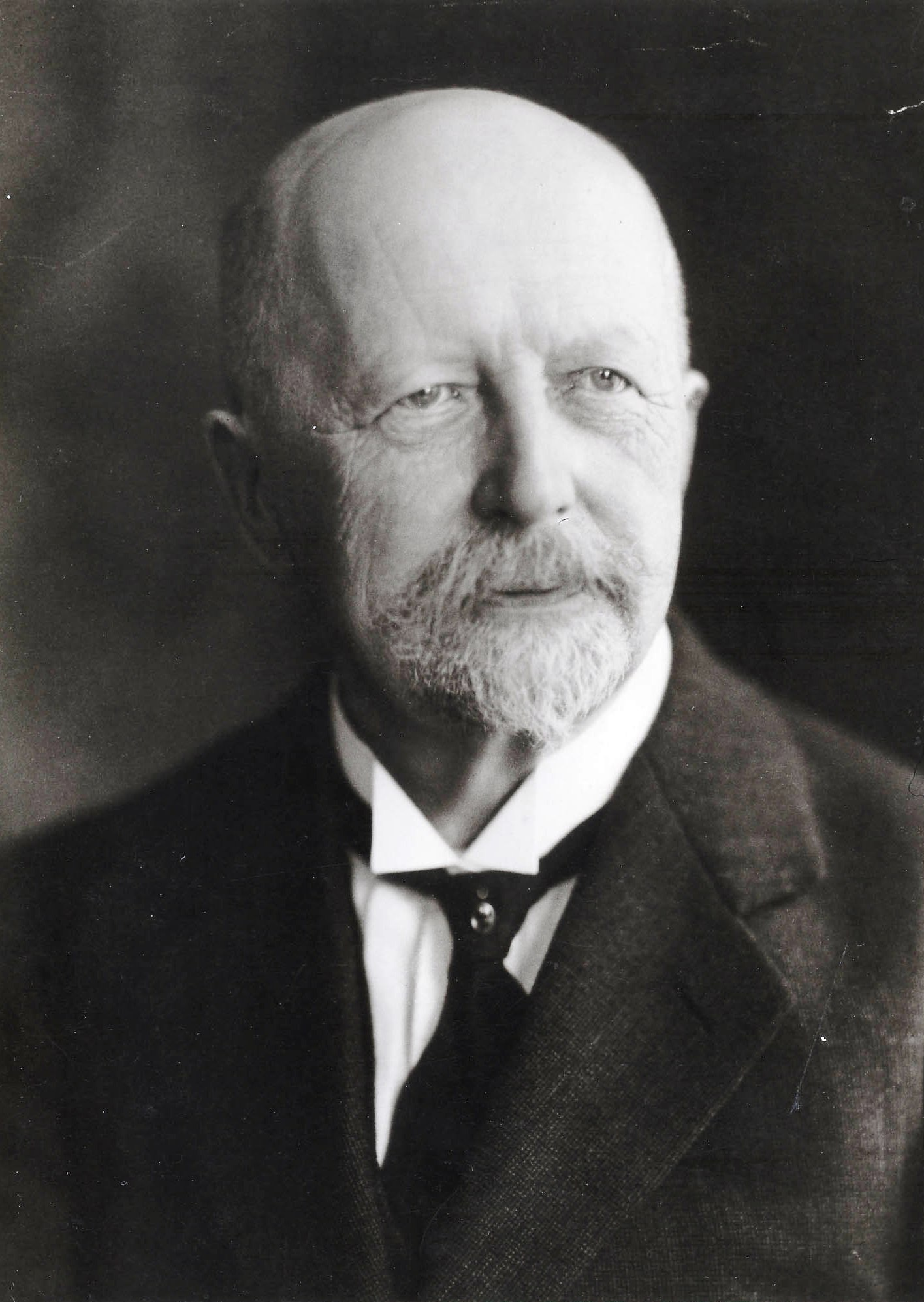
Carl Mirbt (ca. 1925)

Carl Theodor Mirbt (July 21, 1860 in Gnadenfrei, Province of Silesia – September 27, 1929 in Göttingen) was a German Protestant church historian. He was a member of the history of religions school.

== Biography ==
Mirbt studied theology from 1880 to 1885 in Halle, Erlangen and Göttingen. During his studies in Göttingen, he was a member of the Thuringia Academic Theological Society. In 1888, he became a member of the Theological Faculty of the University of Göttingen with a doctoral dissertation on "The Position of Augustine in the Gregorian Church Dispute". In 1888, he qualified as a Göttingen professor in church history.

In 1889, he was an associate professor of church history at the University of Marburg, and in 1890 a full professor there. He held the office of rector (1903/04). From 1911 until his retirement in 1928, Mirbt was professor of church history at the University of Göttingen, where he served as rector (1920/21). In 1914 Carl Mirbt became an honorary member of the German fraternity Göttinger Wingolf.

In 1918, Mirbt founded the German Society of Missionology, which he chaired until his death. From 1927 to 1929, he was chairman of the Society of Lower Saxon Church History.

== Works (translated German titles) ==
- Quellen zur Geschichte des Papsttums und des römischen Katholizismus [Sources for the History of the Papacy] (in German). Freiburg: J.C.B. Mohr. 1895. 100542261 at the HathiTrust Digital Library.
- The Prussian Legation at the court of the pope. Leipzig: Evangel Bookstore d. Federal, 1899.
- The Catholic - Faculty of Theology at Marburg: a contribution to the history of the Catholic church in the Electorate of Hesse and Nassau. Marburg: Elwert, 1905.
- Missionary and Colonial Policy in the German Protectorates. Tübingen 1910
- History of the Catholic Church from the mid-18th Century until the Vatican Council. Berlin [u.a.]: Goschen'sche Verl.buchh, 1913
- The Evangelical Mission: an Introduction to its History and Character. Leipzig: Hinrichs'sche Bookstore, 1917.

== Commentary on Mirbt ==
Kirby Page writes in Jesus or Christianity, A Study in Contrasts (1929):

In 1895 Carl Mirbt, a prelate of the Papal household, eulogized the Inquisition in these words: "O blessed flame of those pyres by which a very few crafty and insignificant persons were taken away that hundreds of hundreds of phalanxes of souls should be saved from the jaws of error and eternal damnation! O noble and venerable memory of Torquemada!"

Note that Kirby Page's statement is a misinterpretation of the following excerpt from Preserved Smith's The Age of the Reformation, where Smith cites p. 390 of Mirbt's 1911 edition of Quellen zur Geschichte des Papsttums (Sources for the History of the Papacy, a collection of original Papal documents through history), as the 1895 (coincidentally publication year of the first edition of Quellen) Papal Latin source text of an unknown prelate, which Smith translates (in quotes) as follows:

A prelate of the papal household published in 1895 the following words in the Annales ecclesiastici: "Some sons of darkness nowadays with dilated nostrils and wild eyes inveigh against the intolerance of the Middle Ages. But let not us blinded by that liberalism that bewitches under the guise of wisdom seek for silly little reasons to defend the Inquisition. Let no one speak of the condition of the times and intemperate zeal as if the church needed excuses. 0 blessed flames of those pyres by which a very few crafty and insignificant persons were taken away that hundreds of hundreds of phalanxes of souls should be saved from the jaws of error and eternal damnation. 0 noble and venerable memory of Torquemada!"
