= Wilhelm Bousset =

German theologian and New Testament scholar

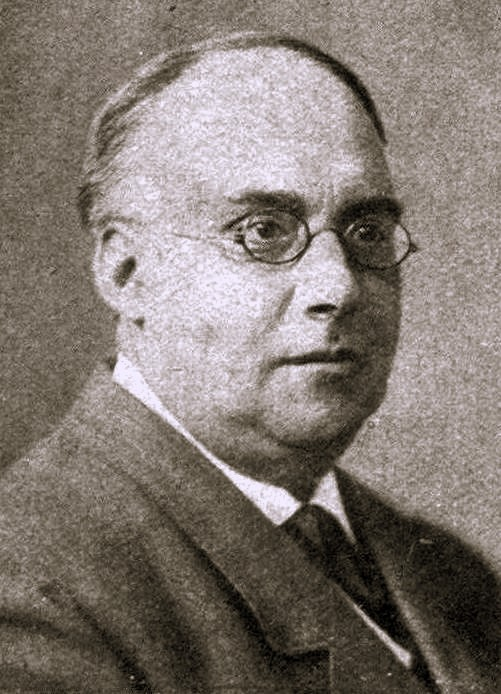

Wilhelm Bousset (3 September 1865, Lübeck – 8 March 1920, Gießen) was a German theologian and New Testament scholar. He was of Huguenot ancestry and a native of Lübeck. His most influential work was Kyrios Christos, an attempt to explain the origins of devotion to Christ as the product of second century Hellenistic forces, and is still the most widely influential academic work on early Christology, even though its conclusions are not supported by modern scholarship.

== Biography ==
He began his studies at the University of Erlangen, where he met Ernst Troeltsch (1865–1923), with whom he would maintain a friendship that would last throughout his career. Later on, he studied at Leipzig, where he was student of Adolf von Harnack (1851–1930), and afterwards continued his education at the University of Göttingen. In 1890 he became a professor of New Testament exegesis at Göttingen, later relocating to the University of Giessen (1916).

Bousset was a prominent figure in the Religionsgeschichtliche Schule (history of religions school), a group that included scholars such as Richard August Reitzenstein (1861–1931), Albert Eichhorn (1856–1926) and Hermann Gunkel (1862–1932). His better known work involved comparative studies between the Early Christian Church and other religious beliefs, particularly Hellenistic Judaism.

== Kyrios Christos ==
In 1913, Wilhelm Bousset published his classic work Kyrios Christos analyzing the early emergence of Christ devotion in the first two centuries of Christianity. Bousset's work qualified as the most influential work on the history of early Christology and Christ devotion in the 20th century, and Bousset's work has shaped more than a generation's worth of scholarship. It underwent various editions, and in 1970, was translated into English. Bousset posited a distinction between the early Palestinian community of Jesus' followers and the second generation of Christians, composed, to a much more significant degree, of non-Jewish Gentile Christians. Bousset, in coming to this conclusion, rejected evaluation of any sources outside the Synoptic Gospels, including the letters of Paul. These Christians, who lived and were highly familiar with the pagan and Hellenistic communities of the Roman world, developed a belief that Jesus was Kyrios, Lord, analogous to other pagan beliefs in cultic deities and deified men. The letters of Paul and Gospel of John reveal evidence of this Hellenism, whereas second century Christians such as Ignatius, Justin Martyr and Irenaeus reveal even more pagan influence.

Despite the major impact made by Bousset's work, numerous recent developments in scholarship and an increase in the available texts from this period has led to a rejection of Bousset's thesis, and it is now recognized that Bousset's work was largely influenced by his liberal Protestant bias and attempt to create a form of earliest Christianity that resembled his own views. Larry Hurtado, a major modern scholar in early Christology, writes;

To summarize up to this point: Bousset has been shown to be seriously wrong both in his portrayal of his "primitive" Jewish Christian community and in his characterization of key features of the devotion of Paul and the Christian groups he represents. These alone are major reasons to set aside Kyrios Christos as an account of the development of Christ-devotion. The extent of the problems with Bousset's characterization of early devotion to Jesus is such that one wonders how such an erudite scholar could have made such mistakes, and the answer, I suggest, has to do with the approach and assumptions that Bousset brought to his analysis. As I have stated already, Bousset sought to make the story of early Christ-devotion a simple tale of Hellenization, more specifically, the progressive paganization of a supposedly pure, primitive Christian faith.

Hurtado describes other significant components of Bousset's thesis that are now widely rejected by modern scholarship. Bousset argued that the primitive Christian community believed in a heavenly redeemer figure called the 'Son of Man' from pre-Christian Jewish traditions, and that Jesus referred to this figure in his sayings in the Gospels. Bousset believed this title was used in early christological confessions in the primitive Christian community. However, modern scholars have concluded that the "Son of Man" never constituted a title in pre-Christian Jewish tradition, nor that it was used as a confessional title in the early Christian community. Furthermore, scholars now widely regard Jesus to be self-referential when mentioning the "Son of Man" figures in the Gospels, rather than referring to some alternative heavenly redeemer figure. Furthermore, Bousset also relied on a distinction between "Palestinian" and "Hellenistic" for his studies on early Christology that, though was widely accepted in his day, has now been rejected by modern scholars as being simplistic. The relationship between Palestinian Judaism and Hellenistic Judaism is considered to be complex, with varying influences between the two concepts in different communities rather than clearly separable layers by which study on early Christology can be conducted.

== Publications ==
Bousset was a prolific writer, and among his books that were translated into English were Kyrios Christos: Geschichte des Christusglaubens von den Anfängen des Christentums bis Irenäus (Kyrios Christos; A History of the Belief in Christ from the Beginnings of Christianity to Irenaeus), and Der Antichrist in Der Uberlieferung Des Judentums, Des Neuen Testaments Und Der Alten Kirche (Antichrist Legend: A Chapter in Christian and Jewish Folklore). Other noted works by Bousset include:

- Jesu Predigt in ihrem Gegensatz zum Judentum. Ein religionsgeschichtlicher Vergleich (1893).
- Der Antichrist in der Ueberlieferung des Judentums, des neuen Testaments und der alten Kirche (1895).
- Offenbarung Johannis (Kritisch-Exegetischer Kommentar Über Das Neue Testament) (1896).
- Contributions to the Encyclopaedia Biblica (1903).
- Die Religion des Judentums im neutestamentlichen Zeitalter (1903).
- Das Wesen Der Religion Dargestellt an Ihrer Geschichte (1904).
- Wilhelm Bousset, Was Wissen Wir von Jesus? (1904)
- Hauptprobleme Der Gnosis (1907).
- Contributions to "1911 Encyclopædia Britannica".
- Kyrios Christos. Geschichte des Christusglaubens von den Anfängen des Christentums bis Irenaeus, (1913).
- Religionsgeschichtliche Studien: Aufsätze Zur Religionsgeschichte Des Hellenistischen Zeitalters. (1979)
