= Wilhelm Heitmüller =

German theologian

Wilhelm Heitmüller (3 August 1869 – 29 January 1926) was a German Protestant theologian, born in Döteberg, presently a division in the town of Seelze.

Following completion of theological studies, he attended the minister's seminary at Loccum. In 1902 he received his habilitation at Göttingen, and in 1908 became a professor of New Testament studies at the University of Marburg. Later on, he was appointed professor at the universities of Bonn (1920) and Tübingen (1924). He died, aged 56, in Tübingen.

Heitmüller was a prominent member of the Religionsgeschichtliche Schule (History of religions school). Along with Wilhelm Bousset (1865–1920), he was editor of the journal Theologische Rundschau.

== Selected writings ==
- Im Namen Jesu: eine sprach- und religionsgeschichtliche Untersuchung zum Neuen Testament, speziell zur altchristlichen Taufe ("In the name of Jesus: a language and religious historical inquiry into the New Testament, particularly in regards to Christian baptism"), 1903.
- Taufe und Abendmahl bei Paulus ("Baptism and Eucharist by St. Paul"), 1903.
- Vom Glauben (Of faith), 1903, second edition 1904).
- Taufe und Abendmahl im Urchristentum ("Baptism and Eucharist of the Apostolic Age'), 1911.
