= Roadex Project =

Road project in Northern Europe

The ROADEX Project was an EU-funded collaboration between Northern European road organisations from Finland, Iceland, Ireland, Norway, Scotland and Sweden that aimed to improve the condition of rural road networks. The project started as a pilot in 1998 to share best practices, research and develop new knowledge, and implement and test new solutions; it is still active, as the ROADEX Network, and currently comprises 13 partner organisations.

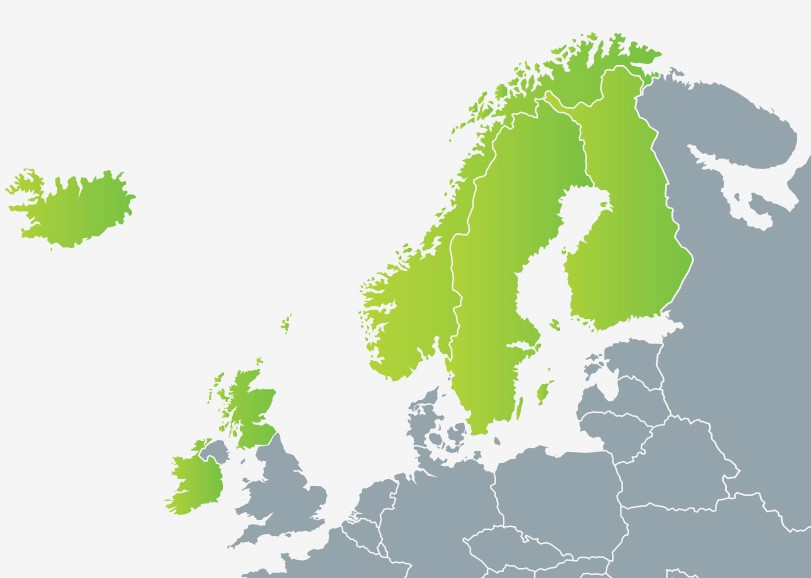
Map of the ROADEX countries

It has now been running for 22 years and has become a centre of information for all things concerning the management of rural roads. Its website averages over 5,000 hits per month from around the world seeking information and strategies for dealing with issues of poorly performing roads, including Banked turns, Cross slopes, traction, Drainage gradients, and in the European Campaign for Safe Road Design.

The project was awarded a European Union RegioStars special mention in 2009. and in 2018 its strategies and technologies were recognised in a Global Road Achievement Award by the International Road Federation for ″Asset Preservation and Maintenance Management″

The project became self-funding as the ROADEX Network in 2012.

== Projects 1998–2012 ==
=== Pilot project, 1998–2001 ===
The pilot project (ROADs Information EXchange = ROADEX) was set up between the roads districts of Finnish Lapland, Troms County of the Norwegian Public Roads Administration, the Northern Region of The Swedish National Road Administration and the Highland Council of Scotland. It was 50% funded by the European Union and also received support from The Scottish Executive and The Icelandic Road Administration.

The pilot identified 5 common problems, and these issues still form the basis for all considerations today.

1. Road drainage
2. Heavy trucks and permanent deformation (i.e. rutting)
3. Poor quality road materials
4. Roads on peat
5. Widened roads

=== ROADEX II, 2002–2005 ===
This second project continued to be part-funded by the EU and aimed at developing new ways for the management of rural roads. The four members from the pilot were joined by two new organisations from Scotland: Forest Enterprise of Scotland and Comhairle Nan Eilean Siar and six associate partners: The Norwegian Hauliers Association, The Finnish Road Administration Lapland District, Metsähallitus Forestry, Stora Enso Metsä, Metsäliitto Osuukunta, and The Forestry Centre of Lapland. The new associate partners from the forestry and paper industry brought the experience of using forest gravel roads to the project and extended its researches into all road surfaces.

The formal outputs of the co-operation included a DVD Focussing on low volume roads in the Northern Periphery and 11 technical reports.

=== ROADEX III, 2006–2007 ===
The third project was designed as a Dissemination and Implementation project to show how the strategies and practices developed under the previous projects could be used in practice and what benefits could result. This included translating the reports into the six partner languages, presentations at conferences, seminars and workshops. Four new e-learning training packages were produced for the website in the partner languages and road trials of new solutions trialled on local roads.

Five new organisations joined: The Icelandic Road Administration, The Swedish Forest Agency, The Department of Transport and The National Roads Authority from Ireland, and The Municipality of Sisimiut of the Greenland Home Rule Government. The Swedish Board of Forestry, Dalarna/Gävleborg and the Russian Association of Regional Road Authorities (RADOR), joined as Associate Partners.

A new area of research was the measurement of daily vibration in drivers of heavy vehicles caused by poorly maintained road networks. An important finding of the research was that this arises wholly as a result of the condition of the road and cannot be mitigated by modern trucks with modern suspension systems.

Outputs of the project included 3 DVDs and 14 technical reports on the management and maintenance of roads, including the socio-economic benefits of rural roads to communities. HITRANS of Scotland was one of the first organisations to recommended the adoption of the new strategies.

The project received a RegioStars award in 2009 by the Northern Periphery Programme.

=== ROADEX IV, 2009–2012 ===
The fourth project carried out a programme of demonstrations of strategies on live public roads. The work was supported by a new consultancy service and web-based knowledge centre. New research and development continued in the areas of climate change, road widening and driver health issues. The Forest Engineering Research Institute of Canada (FERIC) and Coillte of Ireland joined as Associate Partners.

In all 30 technical reports were published at the end of the project, covering issues such as road drainage methods in different countries and road types, demonstrations of road repairs and widening, road condition surveys and proposals for forest roads. The project concluded with a summary report on the benefits and savings that could be achieved using the new strategies.

The ROADEX project was listed as a best case study for tangible benefits in the final summary report of the Northern Periphery Programme 2007–2013, "Achievement".

== Network since 2012 ==
EU part-funding of the ROADEX projects ended in 2012 and the partners continued at their own cost as the "ROADEX Network". Joint research continued to keep the collaboration current and sharing information

Recent projects involving strategies developed by the project include: research into the effects of the new generations of heavy trucks on road surfaces; and the PEHKO project in Finland.

The PEHKO Project was the first comprehensive long-term application of the ROADEX strategies in a main road maintenance programme. The Finnish Transport Agency commissioned the project in 2015 on two test areas on the Kemi-Tornio and Karstula to take place from 2015 to 2025. In this the ROADEX strategies and analyses are being used to design the maintenance plans for the test areas to improve the condition of the network, whilst reducing maintenance costs . The key operations are better drainage maintenance, pro-active snow removal and targeted repairs of road sections that need action. Early results in 2016 showed clear benefits in the two test areas. The trials were extended to a third test network in the Uusimaa area outside Helsinki in 2018.

The PEHKO project was awarded the 2018 Global Road Achievement Award for ″Asset Preservation and Maintenance Management″ by the International Road Federation. The project publishes results its results internationally

== Website ==
The project website, www.roadex.org, contains everything that has done since 1998, and holds the e-learning suite and knowledge centre. It is fully open access. As of 2020 the project website was averaging over 5,000 users per month from around the world seeking information and solutions, including India (18%), USA (13%), Philippines (8%), Malaysia (5%), Nigeria (5%).
