= Nathan MacDonald =

British biblical scholar (born 1975)

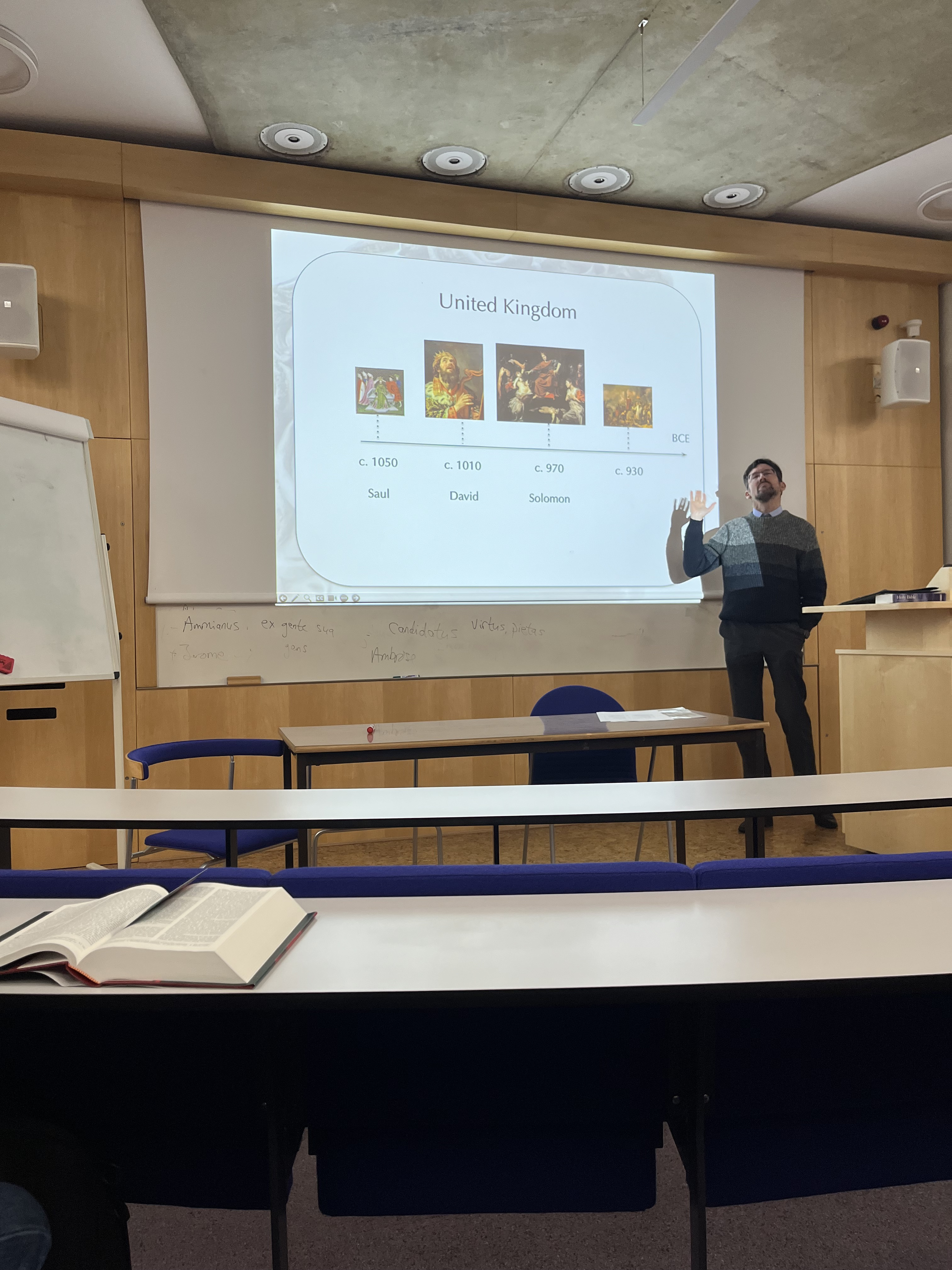
MacDonald lecturing at the Cambridge Faculty of Divinity in October 2025

A British biblical scholar, Nathan MacDonald (born 1975) currently serves as Reader in the Interpretation of the Old Testament at the University of Cambridge as well as Fellow and College Lecturer in theology at St John's College, Cambridge. Much of his work has concentrated on the historical conception of monotheism in ancient Israel and the Hebrew Bible. Through major research projects, publications, conference organization, and editorial undertakings, his academic endeavors have helped bridge Anglo-American and Continental biblical scholarship.

== Life ==
Having earned a BA(Hons) in theology and then an MA and MPhil in Classical Hebrew studies at Cambridge University, he received a PhD in theology at Durham University, which he completed in 2002. Throughout his education, MacDonald focused on the Hebrew Bible.

MacDonald served as teaching fellow, lecturer, then reader in Hebrew and Old Testament at the University of St Andrews before moving to the University of Cambridge as lecturer in Hebrew Bible as well as fellow and college lecturer in theology at St John's. Overlapping with his time as reader at St Andrews and then lecturer and fellow in Cambridge, MacDonald directed the Sofia Kovalevskaya research project "Early Jewish Monotheisms" from 2009 to 2014, hosted by Hermann Spieckermann in the Faculty of Theology at the University of Göttingen. He has also conducted his research during stays at LMU Munich and the Kenyon Institute, in Jerusalem.

== Honors, grants & awards ==
Among numerous other marks of distinction, MacDonald received the John Templeton Award for Theological Promise, an Alexander von Humboldt Foundation research fellowship, the Sofia Kovalevskaya Award, and the Society of Biblical Literature's D.N. Freedman Award for Excellence and Creativity in Hebrew Bible Scholarship. His work has seen reception in the popular press as well, from the BBC and Telegraph to the Scientific American.

== Professional activities ==
In addition to sitting on editorial boards for the Journal of the Bible and its Reception and Journal of Theological Interpretation, MacDonald has served as founding editor for the Eisenbrauns' books series "Critical Studies in the Hebrew Bible" and "Siphrut: Literature and Theology of the Hebrew Bible." He also edits the subseries "Studies of the Sofja Kovalevskaja Research Group on Early Jewish Monotheisms," which comprises part of Mohr Siebeck's book series Forschungen zum alten Testament. As translator, he contributes to the Common English Bible.

MacDonald holds membership to the Society for Old Testament Study, the Higher Education Academy, the Society of Biblical Literature, and Old Testament Studies: Epistemologies and Methods (OTSEM). He provides council for Westcott House, Cambridge, too.
