= Wissenschaftlicher Assistent =

Wissenschaftlicher Assistent, often shortened to Assistent, literally "scientific assistant", is an academic position at German universities for researchers with doctoral degrees and additional academic qualifications, who are typically employed to conduct research to qualify themselves for the Habilitation and thus a full professorship.

The position is partially comparable to a postdoctoral researcher in many universities today, and partially to assistant professors in the North American system. When a person obtained an Habilitation (or in some cases, equivalent qualifications), he or she would be eligible to become Adjunct Full Professor (außerplanmäßiger Professor), Professor Extraordinarius (außerordentlicher Professor) or even Professor Ordinarius (ordentlicher Professor). Without the formerly obligatory Habilation, another path to full professorship at some German universities has been the Juniorprofessur since 2005. The latter is usually divided into two three-year evaluation periods, after whose successful completion the Juniorprofessur is transformed into a full professorship.
