= History of religions school =

Group of German Protestant theologians in the 1890s

The history of religions school (German: Religionsgeschichtliche Schule) is a term applied to a group of German Protestant theologians associated with the University of Göttingen in the 1890s. (Note: Baird: "A new approach to the study of the NT was advanced by the "history of religions" school (Religionsgeschichtliche Schule)". It was a school without a teacher and without pupils.")

== Ideas ==
The Religionsgeschichtliche Schule used the methodologies of higher criticism, (Note: Encyclopedia Britannica, Religionsgeschichtliche Schule) a branch of criticism that investigates the origins of ancient texts in order to understand "the world behind the text." It compared Christianity to other religions, regarding it as one religion among others and rejecting its claims to absolute truth, and demonstrating that it shares characteristics with other religions. It argued that Christianity was not simply the continuation of the Old Testament, but syncretistic, and was rooted in and influenced by Hellenistic Judaism (Philo) and Hellenistic religions like the mystery cults and Gnosticism. (Note: Kurt Rudolph (1987), Religionsgeschichtliche Schule, Encyclopedia of Religion)

== Influence ==
The school initiated new areas of research into Biblical history and textual analysis.

== Members ==
The circle included Bernhard Duhm (1873), Albert Eichhorn (1856–1926; 1886), Hermann Gunkel (1888), Johannes Weiss (1888), Wilhelm Bousset (1890), Alfred Rahlfs (1891), Ernst Troeltsch (1891), William Wrede (1891), Heinrich Hackmann (1893), and later Rudolf Otto (1898), Hugo Gressmann (1902) and Wilhelm Heitmüller (1902). Related were Carl Mirbt (1888), Carl Clemen (1892), Heinrich Weinel (1899), and in his early years Paul Wernle (1897). Rudolf Bultmann (1884–1976) may be considered as a third-generation member of this school.

== See also ==
- Gnosticism
- Religions of the ancient Near East

== Sources ==
Printed sources

- Baird, William (2002), History of New Testament Research: From Jonathan Edwards to Rudolf Bultmann, Ausgburg Fortress
- Kurtz, Paul Michael. Kaiser, Christ, and Canaan: The Religion of Israel in Protestant Germany, 1871–1918. Forschungen zum Alten Testament I/122. Tübingen: Mohr Siebeck, 2018.
- Rudolph, Kurt (1987), "Religionsgeschichtliche Schule", in Gale, Thomson (ed.), Encyclopedia of Religion
- Soulen, Richard N. (2001), Handbook of biblical criticism (3rd ed., rev. and expanded ed.), Louisville, Ky.: Westminster John Knox Press, ISBN 0-664-22314-1

Web-sources
