= Ernst Troeltsch =

German theologian, writer, philosopher and politician (1865–1923)

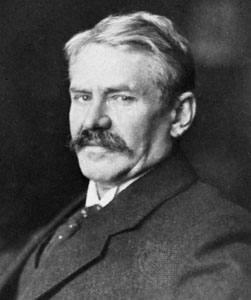
- Born: 17 February 1865; Haunstetten, Kingdom of Bavaria
- Died: 1 February 1923 (aged 57); Berlin, Free State of Prussia, Weimar Germany

Education
- Education: University of Erlangen; University of Göttingen

Philosophical work
- Era: 19th-century philosophy
- Region: Western philosophy
- School: Neo-Kantianism (Baden school); History of religions school; Liberal Christianity; Classical liberalism
- Institutions: University of Göttingen; University of Bonn; University of Heidelberg; University of Berlin
- Notable students: Gertrud von Le Fort; Friedrich Gogarten
- Main interests: Theology; philosophy of history
- Notable ideas: Three principles of historiography (principle of criticism, principle of analogy, principle of correlation)

Ernst Peter Wilhelm Troeltsch (/trɛltʃ/; German: [tʁœltʃ]; 17 February 1865 – 1 February 1923) was a German liberal Protestant theologian, a writer on the philosophy of religion and the philosophy of history, and a classical liberal politician. He was a member of the history of religions school. His work was a synthesis of a number of strands, drawing on Albrecht Ritschl, Max Weber's conception of sociology, and the Baden school of neo-Kantianism.

== Life ==
Troeltsch was born on 17 February 1865 into a Lutheran family to a doctor and went to a Catholic school in a predominantly Catholic area. He attended first the University of Erlangen and then the University of Göttingen. During his university years, he experienced difficulties in his student fraternity as a result of his homosexuality. His ordination in 1889 was followed in 1891 by a post teaching theology at Göttingen. In 1892, he moved on to teach at the University of Bonn. In 1894, he moved on again to Heidelberg University teaching systematic theology. The outbreak of World War 1 led Troeltsch to develop both an interest in politics and a friendship with his colleague Max Weber. As differences between him and Weber arose, he transferred 1915 to what is now the University of Berlin, where he took the title of professor of philosophy and civilization.

While working in Berlin, Troeltsch fell in with a group of other academics including Adolf von Harnack, Friedrich Meinecke, and Hans Delbruck. All of them called for major social and political reforms, opposed the growing wave of nationalism in Germany, and supported the ascension of Maximilian of Baden to the chancellorship in 1918. After the German Revolution, Troeltsch became a founding member of German Democratic Party and served as a member in the Landtag of Prussia. From here he became undersecretary of the Ministry of Culture and influenced the drafting of the Prussian Constitution, particularly in his ideas about the role of the church as it relates to education.

Troeltsch died on 1 February 1923. At his funeral spoke the church historian Adolf von Harnack.

== Theology ==
Troeltsch was a religious liberal, and he argued that Christianity did not arise from divine revelation but only as an instance of natural human drive towards religion. This attitude alienated him from the Christian religious establishment.

Throughout Troeltsch's life, he wrote frequently of his belief that changes in society posed a threat to Christian religion and that "the disenchantment of the world" as described by sociologist Max Weber was underway. At an academic conference that took place in 1896, after a paper on the doctrine of Logos, Troeltsch responded by saying, "Gentlemen, everything is tottering!" Troeltsch also agreed with Weber's Protestant work ethic, restating it in his Protestantism and Progress. He viewed the creation of capitalism as having been the result of the specific Protestant sects named by Weber, rather than as a result of Protestantism as a whole. However, his analysis of Protestantism was more optimistic than Weber's in its focus on religious personal conviction as a source for individualism and spiritual mysticism as a source for subjectivism. Troeltsch interpreted non-Calvinist Protestantism as having had a positive effect on the development of the press, modern education systems, and politics.

His study, The Social Teaching of the Christian Churches (1912), is about the history of Christian social precepts—as they pertain to culture, economics, and institutions—in the history of Western Civilization. Troeltsch's distinction between churches and sects as social types, for instance, set the course for further theological study.

Troeltsch sought to explain the decline of religion in the modern era by studying the historical evolution of religion in society. He described European civilization as having three periods: ancient, medieval, and modern. Instead of claiming that modernity starts with the rise of Protestantism, Troeltsch argued that early Protestantism should be understood as a continuation of the medieval period. Therefore, the modern period starts later in his account: in the seventeenth century. The Renaissance in Italy and the scientific revolution planted the seeds for the arrival of the modern period. Protestantism delayed, rather than heralded, modernity. The reform movement around Luther, Troeltsch argued, was "in the first place, simply a modification of Catholicism, in which the Catholic formulation of the problems was retained, while a different answer was given to them."

Troeltsch saw the distinction between early and late (or "neo-") Protestantism as "the presupposition for any historical understanding of Protestantism."

== Historiography ==
Troeltsch developed three principles pertaining to critical historiography in his 1898 essay "On Historical and Dogmatic Method in Theology", or in the original German "Über historische und dogmatische Methode in der Theologie."

Each of the principles served as a philosophical retort for preconceived notions. Troeltsch's principles (criticism, analogy, correlation) were used to account for historians' biases.

=== Principle of criticism ===
Troeltsch's claim in the principle concludes that absolutes within history cannot exist. Troeltsch surmised that judgments about the past must be varied. As such, the absolute truth of historical reality could not exist, but he claimed historical situation could be examined as more or less likely to have happened. For Troeltsch, finite and non-revisable historical claims are questionable.

=== Principle of analogy ===
Historians often think in analogies, which leads them to make anachronistic claims about the past. Troeltsch argued that the probability of analogies cannot usually be validated. He presented human nature as being fairly constant throughout time.

=== Principle of correlation ===
In regard to historical events, Troeltsch determined that humanity's historical life is interdependent upon each individual. Since the cumulative actions of individuals create historical events, there is a causal nature to all events that create an effect. Any radical event, the historian should assume, affected the historical nexus immediately surrounding that event. Troeltsch determines that in historical explanation, it is important to include antecedents and consequences of events in an effort to maintain historical events in their conditioned time and space.

== Politics ==
Troeltsch was politically a classical liberal and served as a member of the Parliament of the Grand Duchy of Baden. In 1918, he joined the German Democratic Party (DDP). He strongly supported Germany's role in World War I: "Yesterday we took up arms. Listen to the ethos that resounds in the splendour of heroism: To your weapons, to your weapons!"

== Reception ==
In the immediate aftermath of Troeltsch's death, his work fell into neglect as part of a wider rejection of liberal thought with the rise of neo-orthodoxy in Protestant theology, prominently represented in the German-speaking world by Karl Barth. From 1960 onwards, however, Troeltsch's thought has enjoyed a revival. Several books on Troeltsch's theological and sociological work have been published since 2000.

== Sources ==
- Chapman, Mark. Ernst Troeltsch and Liberal Theology: Religion and Cultural Synthesis in Wilhelmine Germany (Oxford University Press 2002)
- Gerrish, B. A. (1975). Jesus, Myth, and History: Troeltsch's Stand in the "Christ-Myth" Debate. The Journal of Religion 55 (1): 13–35.
- Pauck, Wilhelm. Harnack and Troeltsch: Two historical theologians (Wipf and Stock Publishers, 2015)
- Nix, Jr., Echol, Ernst Troeltsch and Comparative Theology (Peter Lang Publishing; 2010) 247 pages; a study of Troeltsch and the contemporary American philosopher and theologian Robert Neville (b. 1939).
- Norton, Robert E. The Crucible of German Democracy. Ernst Troeltsch and the First World War (Mohr Siebeck 2021).
- Troesltch, Ernst, "Historiography" in James Hastings (ed.), Encyclopedia of Religion and Ethics (New York: Charles Scribner's Sons, 1914), VI, 716–723.
- Troeltsch, Ernst, "Protestantism and Progress," (Transaction Publishers, 2013) with an Introduction - "Protestantism and Progress, Redux," by Howard G. Schneiderman.
