= Albert Eichhorn =

German Protestant theologian

Karl Albert August Ludwig Eichhorn (1 October 1856, Garlstorf – 3 August 1926, Braunschweig) was a German Protestant theologian. He was the author of Das Abendmahl im Neuen Testament and one of the founders of the history of religions school, an approach that sought to understand all religions, including Christianity and Judaism, as socio-cultural phenomena that developed in comparable ways. His pioneering work on the role of the contemporary needs, beliefs, and culture that shaped the New Testament reports of the Last Supper argued that this early Christian sacramental meal reflected the influence of Near Eastern gnostic ideas.

== Publications ==
- Albert Eichhorn, Das Abendmahl im Neuen Testament. Leipzig: Mohr Siebeck, 1898. Translated by Jeffrey F. Cayzer as The Lord’s Supper in the New Testament. With an introductory essay by Hugo Gressmann, “Albert Eichhorn and the History of Religion School.” Atlanta: Society of Biblical Literature, forthcoming (2007).
- Albert Eichhorn, Athanasii De vita ascetica testimonia collecta. Habilitation, Halle, 1886.
- Albert Eichhorn, “Etwas vom Predigen.” Die Christliche Welt (1895): cols. 273–76, 308–10.
- Albert Eichhorn, “Heilige Geschichte,” in Die Religion in Geschichte und Gegenwart (ed. Friedrich Michael Schiele and Leopold Zscharnack; 5 vols.; Tübingen: Mohr Siebeck, 1909–13), 2:2023–27.
- Albert Eichhorn, “Die Rechtfertigungslehre der Apologie.” TSK 59 (1887): 415–91.
