= John 2 =

- ← chapter 1 chapter 3 →
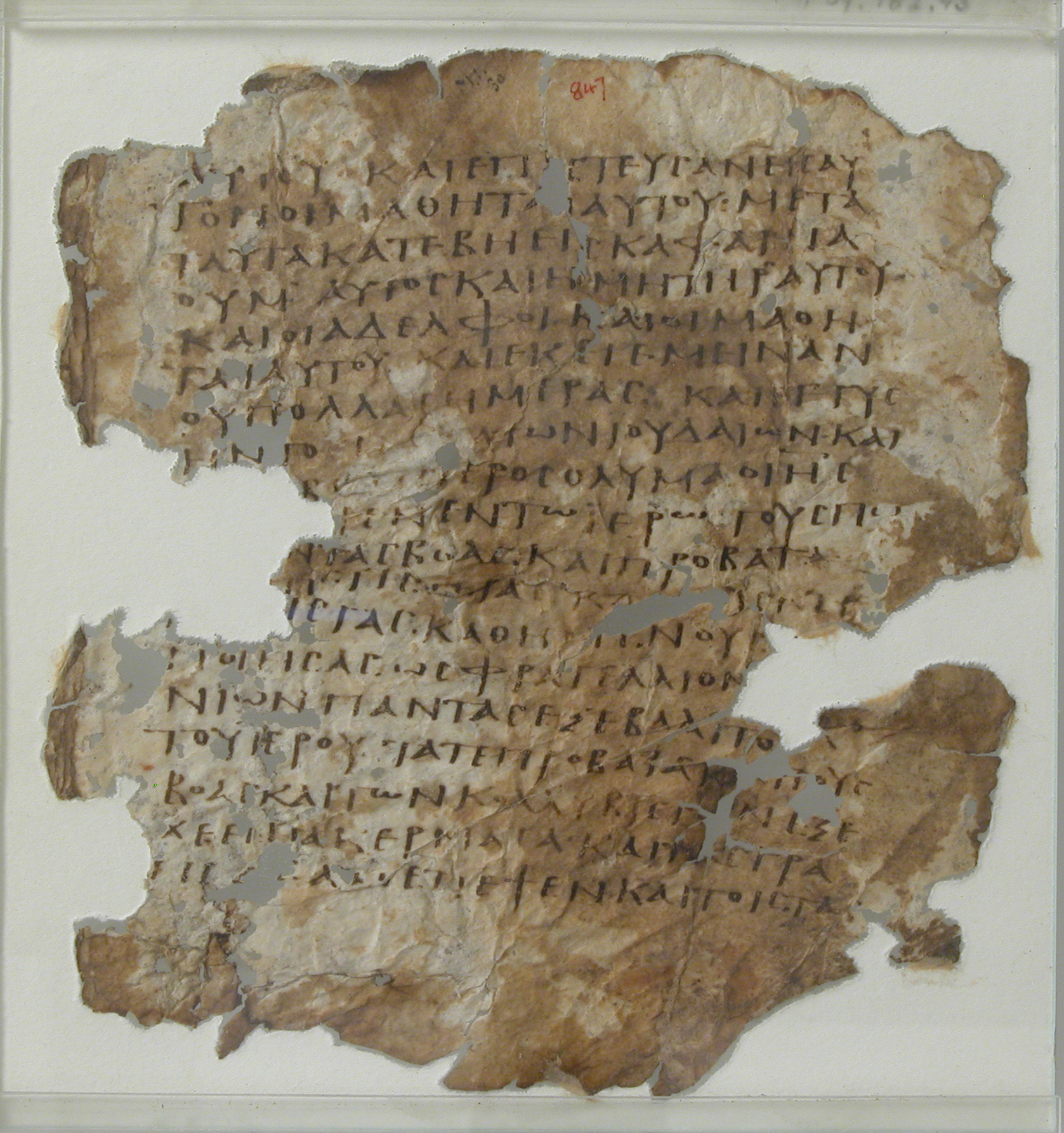
- John 2:11–22 on Uncial 0162 (P.Oxy. 847), c. 300
- Book: Gospel of John
- Category: Gospel
- Christian Bible part: New Testament
- Order in the Christian part: 4

John 2 is the second chapter of the Gospel of John in the New Testament of the Christian Bible. It contains the famous stories of the miracle of Jesus turning water into wine and Jesus expelling the money changers from the Temple. The author of the book containing this chapter is anonymous, but early Christian tradition uniformly affirmed that John composed this gospel.

The chapter and verse divisions did not appear in the original texts: they form part of the paratext of the Bible. Since the early 13th century, most copies and editions of the Bible present all but the shortest of these books with divisions into chapters. Since the mid-16th century editors have further subdivided each chapter into verses.

== Text ==
The original text was written in Koine Greek. This chapter is divided into 25 verses.

=== Textual witnesses ===
Some early manuscripts containing the text of this chapter are: (Note: The extant Codex Ephraemi Rescriptus and Codex Bezae do not contain this chapter due to lacunae)

- Papyrus 75 (AD 175–225)
- Papyrus 66 (c. 200)
- Codex Vaticanus (325–350)
- Codex Sinaiticus (330–360)
- Codex Alexandrinus (400–440)

=== Old Testament references ===
- John 2:17: Psalm 69:9.

== Context ==
The events recorded in chapter one of the Gospel of John take place in Bethabara (or Bethany), "beyond the Jordan", but in John 1:43 it is reported that "Jesus wanted to go to Galilee". Chapter two opens with Jesus, his mother and his disciples present in Galilee, in the village of Cana. Four "days" have been mentioned in John 1, τῇ επαυριον (tē epaurion, "the next day") occurring in verses 29, 35 and 43. John 2 opens on the "third day". The second/third century theologian Origen suggested this was the third day from the last-named day in John 1:44 and the Jamieson-Fausset-Brown Bible Commentary argues that it would take Jesus three days to travel from Bethabara in Perea to Cana in Galilee. (Note: This journey would be 86 miles (138 km) on modern roads using Highway 90.) Lutheran pietist Johann Bengel suggests that this was the third day after the promise given to Nathaniel at the end of chapter 1, but also that the sign given in Cana was "a specimen of its fulfilment", whereas the 19th-century theologian Heinrich Ewald suggested the third day would be reckoned from Jesus' arrival in Cana.

== Water into wine (verses 1–11) ==
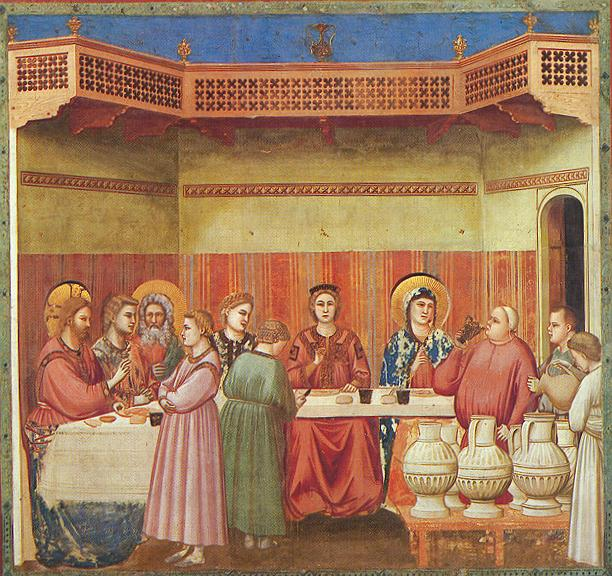

The second chapter of John begins at "a village wedding" celebrated in Cana attended by the mother of Jesus (she is not named in the gospel), Jesus himself and his disciples, who are now "five or six in number, Andrew, John, Peter, Philip, Nathanael, and probably James". The hosts run out of wine, and Jesus' mother asks him to help. Jesus replies "What [is that] to me and to you?" (τι εμοι και σοι). Some interpretations suggest that Jesus is annoyed that she would ask him for a miracle, and he replies that it is not his "time" yet. The Holman Christian Standard Bible presents two interpretations, either "What has this concern of yours to do with Me?" or "You and I see things differently" whereas in the Weymouth New Testament, Jesus' words are "Leave the matter in my hands". The Orthodox Jewish Bible highlights a connection with the narrative of the fall in Genesis 3:15: [God] "will put enmity between you (Adam) and the woman, and between your offspring and her offspring".

The coming of Jesus' "hour" (verse 4) is also referred to in John 7:6, 30 and 8:20, meaning the hour of his glorification and his return to his father. The Jerusalem Bible notes that "this 'hour' is determined by the Father and can be anticipated". Bengel suggests that, even if Jesus' fundamental "hour" has not yet come, his "hour of assisting them" has certainly arrived.

Nevertheless, Jesus' mother still tells the servants to do whatever he asks, so he tells them to fill up the empty water containers with water. Afterwards, the head waiter of the wedding tastes it and remarks to the groom that they have saved the best wine for last. John tells his audience that the water was there for the Jewish rite of purification.

According to John, this was his first sign or miracle (in Cana). It occurs immediately after Jesus has told Nathanael in John 1:50 that "You shall see greater things than that." According to the hypothesis of the Signs Gospel, this miracle was originally in that document. John uses the Greek word semeion meaning sign, or ergon meaning work, instead of the term the synoptics use, dynamis or act of power, for miracle.

This miracle only occurs in the Gospel of John, not in any of the synoptics. The story can be understood as John's fulfillments of prophecies in the Old Testament, such as in Amos 9:13–14 and Genesis 49:10–11 about the abundance of wine that there will be in the time of the messiah. Messianic wedding festivals are mentioned in Isaiah 62:4–5. One can also perhaps see this in the synoptics in for instance Mark 2:21–22, where Jesus speaks about "new wineskins". Jesus' mother, never named in the gospel, appears again in John 19:25–27 at Jesus' crucifixion. This begins a series of stories about Jesus' role as the new way that last until his second miracle or sign, the healing of the official's son in John 4.

== Interlude (verse 12) ==
John 2:12 then says that Jesus went with his mother and brothers and disciples to Capernaum for "not many days", but does not relate what went on there. Cana (Kafr Kanna) is about 24 miles (39 km) from Capernaum using modern roads. Heinrich Meyer pictures Jesus travelling back to Nazareth before moving on to Capernaum, because his brothers are not mentioned as being present at the wedding in Cana but they are with him and his mother in Capernaum.

The synoptic gospels make no mention of Jesus attending the wedding before going to Capernaum, nor that his mother or brothers went there with him. Luke 4 and Matthew 4 report Jesus going to Nazareth and then Capernaum after his baptism and temptation. Mark 1 has him going to Galilee from the wilderness (where he had been tempted by Satan) and visiting several places in Galilee before reaching Capernaum (Mark 1:25, 31, 34). After the authority and power of Jesus had been demonstrated, He and His disciples went throughout Galilee preaching and casting out demons (Mark 1:38–39). Mark later records that they return to Capernaum, after going throughout the neighboring lands.

== Jesus cleanses the Temple (verses 13–22) ==
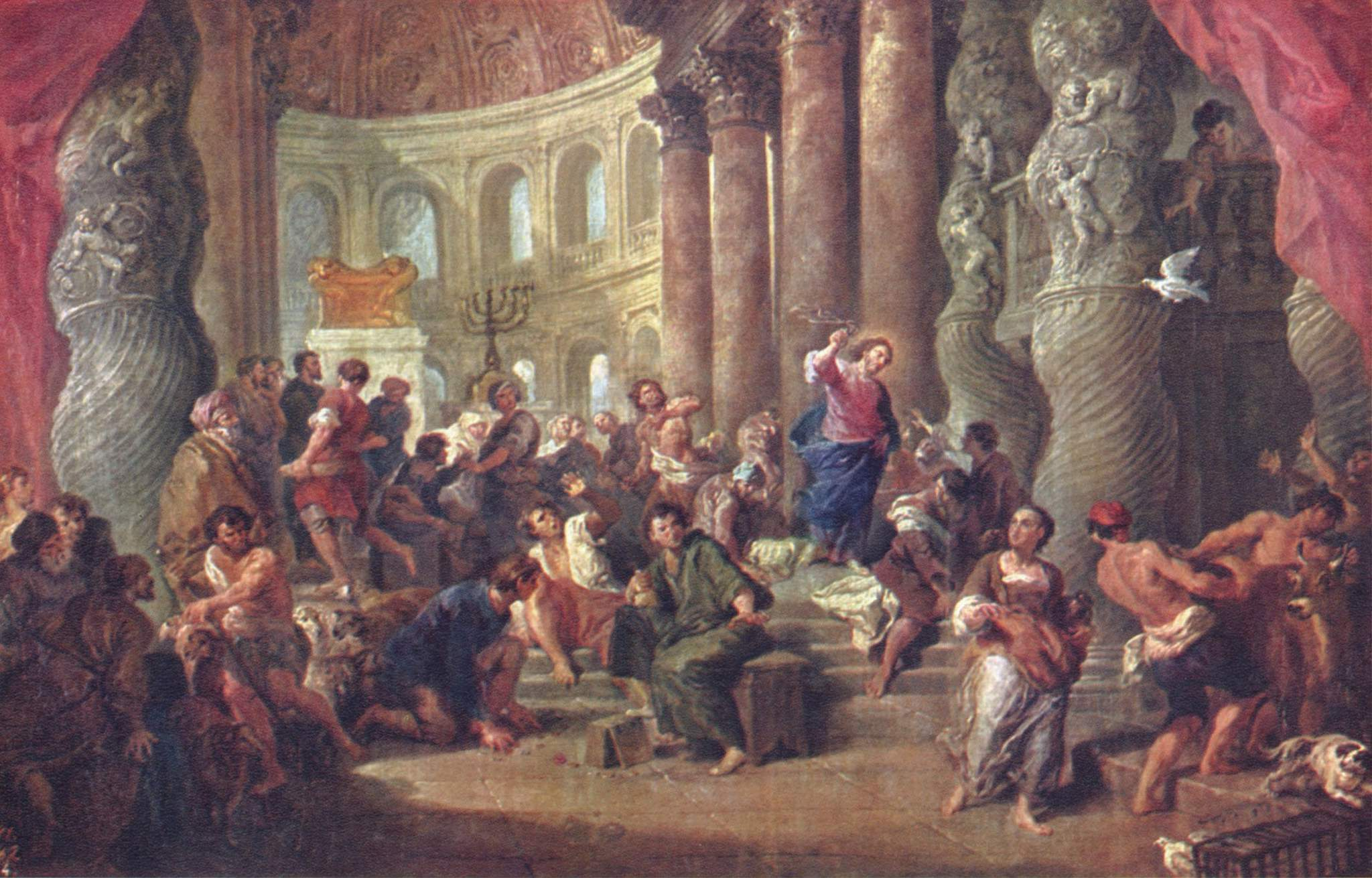
Jesus vertreibt die Händler aus dem Tempel by Giovanni Paolo Pannini

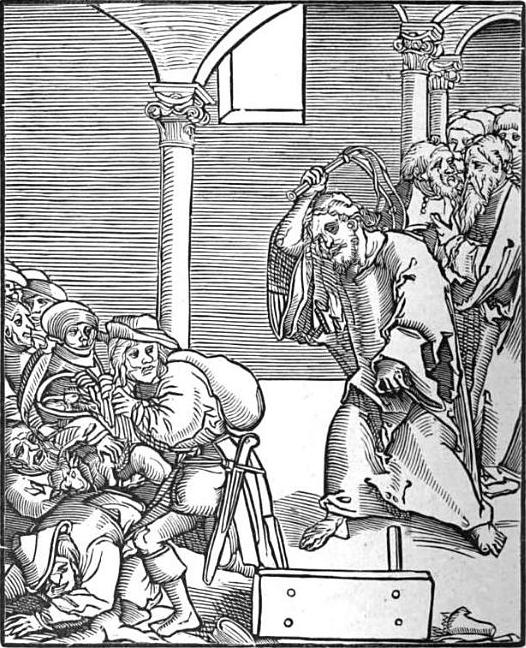
Christ drives the Usurers out of the Temple, a woodcut by Lucas Cranach the Elder in Passionary of Christ and Antichrist

The story of Jesus overturning the tables of the money changers in the Second Temple is related next. Jesus and his disciples go to Jerusalem for the "Passover of the Jews", the first of three visits to Jerusalem recounted in this gospel, the others being in John 7, where he goes for the Feast of Tabernacles, and the final Passover during which he is crucified. He enters the Temple courts and sees people selling livestock and exchanging money. He explodes:

So he made a whip out of cords, and drove all from the temple area, both sheep and cattle; he scattered the coins of the money changers and overturned their tables. To those who sold doves he said, "Get these out of here! How dare you turn my Father's house into a market!

Alfred Plummer notes that Jesus acts directly with the sheep and cattle, driving them out, but as the doves could not be driven out, he gives instructions that they be removed. He thinks the traders who sold the sheep and cattle would probably have fled immediately Jesus began to act. Bengel suggests that the power of Jesus' whip lay in the terror it inspired: it is not said "that He inflicted a single blow upon the men". H. W. Watkins comments that:

It is worth remembering that on the eve of the Passover the head of every family carefully collected all the leaven in the house, and there was a general cleansing. Jesus was doing in His Father's house, it may be, what was then being done in every house in Jerusalem.

John says that Jesus' disciples remembered the words of Psalm 69:9, "zeal for your house will consume me", perhaps a bit of wordplay interposing the ideas of "'demanding all my attention' and 'leading to my destruction'". Whether the disciples remembered this during the incident or afterwards is not clear: theologian Hermann Olshausen suggested that the recollection took place afterwards, but Meyer disagreed: this saying was remembered "at the very time of the occurrence", in contrast to their recollection about Jesus' foretelling of his resurrection (John 2:22), which happened afterwards.

Jesus is asked for "a sign" to prove that he has authority to expel the money changers. He replies "Destroy this temple, and I will raise it again in three days". The people believe he is talking about the Temple building, but John states that Jesus "was speaking of the temple of His body". The disciples remembered this after his resurrection: the majority of texts state that "Jesus had said this", but where the reading in verse 22 has "Jesus had said this to them (the disciples), Meyer suggests that the additional wording is "feebly supported". They "believed the Scripture and the word", faith and memory "lend[ing] mutual help to one another in this passage".

John then says that during the Passover Feast Jesus performed miraculous signs, but does not list them, that caused people to believe in him, but that he would "not entrust himself to them, for he knew all men". Perhaps John included this statement to show Jesus possesses a knowledge of people's hearts and minds, an attribute of God.

This introduces the antagonism between Jesus and "the Jews", as John calls them, a sign perhaps of a non-Jewish audience. This is over the nature of the Temple. The Temple is already destroyed by the time of the writing of John, and John is trying to show right from the start that the old Temple has been replaced by the new Temple, Jesus' resurrected body and the new Christian and Johannine community. This shows to most scholars the split between John's community and Judaism in general. Some of the Dead Sea Scrolls also speak of the community as the temple.

John mentions the incident with the money changers as occurring at the start of Jesus' ministry, while the synoptic gospels have it occurring shortly before his crucifixion. Some scholars suggest that this shows that Jesus fought with the money changers twice, once at the beginning and once at the end of his ministry. The incident in the synoptic gospels occurs in Mark 11:12–19, Matthew 21:12–17, and Luke 19:45–48. John potentially relocates the story to the beginning to show that Jesus' arrest was for the raising of Lazarus in John 11, not the incident in the Temple.

== The discerner of hearts (verses 23–25) ==
The chapter ends with a brief section which the New King James Version subtitles "The Discerner of Hearts" (John 2:23–25). While Jesus stayed in Jerusalem for the Passover feast, he performed various unrecorded signs (Greek: σημεια, sēmeia) or miracles, and many "believed in His name". Swedish-based commentator René Kieffer suggests that the evangelist "probably includes what [had] happened in Cana" among these signs. Origen suggests that the cleansing of the Temple was among these "miracles".

This theme is continued into chapter 3, where the Pharisee Nicodemus acknowledges that "no one can do these signs that You do unless God is with him" (John 3:2).

== Archaeological evidence ==
During the Second Temple period, Jewish people widely used stone vessels made of a material that, according to Jewish ritual law, did not become impure. In August 2024, one of these stone purification vessels was discovered in the City of David. One of the earliest observations of this practice comes from John 2:6.

== Sources ==
- Brown, Raymond E. (1997). An Introduction to the New Testament. Doubleday. ISBN 0-385-24767-2.
- Brown, Raymond E.; et al. (1990). The New Jerome Biblical Commentary. Prentice Hall. ISBN 0-13-614934-0.
- Guthrie, Donald (1994). "John". In Carson, D. A.; France, R. T.; Motyer, J. A.; Wenham, G. J. (eds.). New Bible Commentary: 21st Century Edition (4, illustrated, reprint, revised ed.). Inter-Varsity Press. pp. 1021–1065. ISBN 9780851106489.
- "John 2". KJV at etext.lib.virginia.edu. Archived from the original on July 22, 2001.
- Miller, Robert J. (1994). The Complete Gospels. Polebridge Press. ISBN 0-06-065587-9.

Preceded by John 1	Chapters of the Bible; Gospel of John	Succeeded by John 3
