= John 1:7 =

- ← 1:6 1:8 →
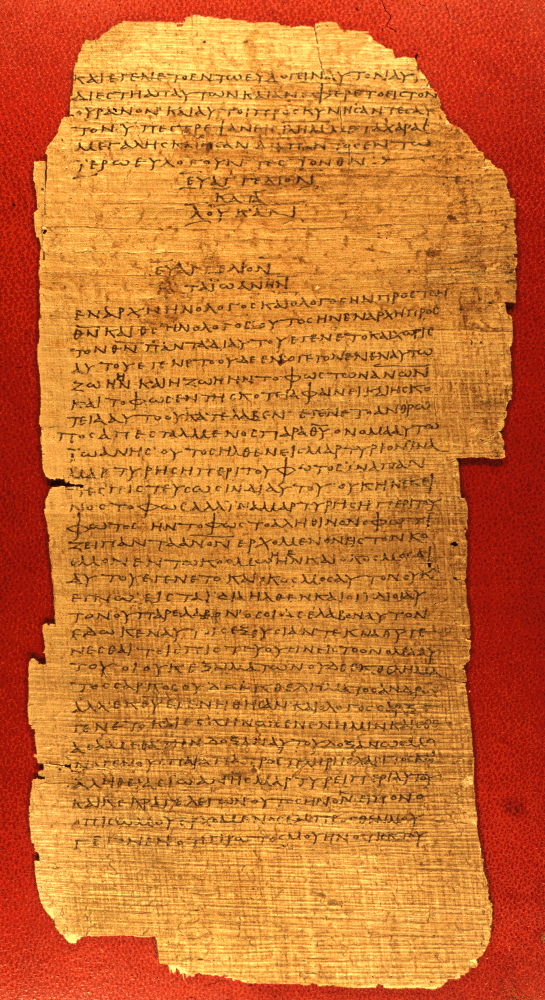
- John 1:1–16 in Papyrus 75 (AD 175–225)
- Book: Gospel of John
- Christian Bible part: New Testament

John 1:7 is the seventh verse in the first chapter of the Gospel of John in the New Testament of the Christian Bible.

== Content ==
In the original Greek according to Westcott-Hort this verse is:

Οὗτος ἦλθεν εἰς μαρτυρίαν, ἵνα μαρτυρήσῃ περὶ τοῦ φωτός, ἵνα πάντες πιστεύσωσι δι᾿ αὐτοῦ.

In the King James Version of the Bible, the text reads:

The same came for a witness, to bear witness of the Light, that all men through him might believe.

The New International Version translates the passage as:

He came as a witness to testify concerning that light, so that through him all men might believe.

== Analysis ==
According to Robert Witham, "That all might believe through him" is John's preaching, who was the instrument of God to induce them to believe in Christ, their Redeemer. According to Irish Archbishop John McEvilly, "the light" refers to the person of Christ. The manner in which John came as a witness is elaborated on in verses 19-34.

Craig S. Keener notes that "witness" (μαρτυρία, martyria) was especially a legal term, though its figurative extension led to a more general usage; in the Septuagint it indicates an appeal to objective evidence and frequently appears in lawcourt or controversy imagery. Keener holds that John's usage may retain some of these legal associations, particularly if, as many scholars contend, the Gospel as a whole is read as a kind of trial narrative; he cites John Painter's conclusion that "the World had Jesus on trial, but was unable to produce a valid witness", while the witnesses for Jesus both cleared him and brought the world under judgement.

Keener further observes that, since John is "not the light" but a witness to it (John 1:8; compare John 5:35), the Evangelist uses him to introduce a theme of witness that extends far beyond the Baptist himself: the Word is the ultimate truth for all of human history, but is made known through witnesses, of whom John was one historical example. On this reading John functions as the prototype of Jesus' disciples, or, in the words of C. H. Dodd, as "the first Christian confessor".

D. A. Carson observes that the courtroom language of "witness" and "testimony", though common in the New Testament, is especially characteristic of this Gospel. A fuller account of the Baptist's own witness appears in John 1:19–34, John 3:27–30, and John 5:35, but Carson notes that the motif is much wider: the Gospel also presents the witness of the Samaritan woman (John 4:39), of the works of Jesus (John 5:36), of the Father (John 5:37), of the Old Testament scriptures (John 5:39–40), of the crowd (John 12:17), and of the Holy Spirit and the apostles (John 15:26–27), all bearing witness to Jesus, who himself bears witness to the truth (John 18:37).

On the clause "that all might believe through him", Carson stresses that this was the purpose of the Baptist's witness, though not necessarily its result; John 1:35–37 gives an instance in which it proved effective. Because the Baptist's testimony is bound up in all four canonical Gospels with the beginning of Jesus' ministry, Carson suggests that, like Abel, "he still speaks, even though he is dead" (Hebrews 11:4), so that all who have come to faith are in some sense indirectly dependent on his opening proclamation of the identity and saving purpose of Jesus.

Keener adds that the "all" who might believe through John is qualified by context, since John's mission as described elsewhere in the Gospel is limited (John 3:26); the unqualified reach of "all" belongs rather to Jesus, who is the light for "all" (John 1:9).

== Commentary from the Church Fathers ==
Thomas Aquinas assembled the following quotations regarding this verse from the early Fathers of the Church:

- Augustine: "Wherefore came he? The same came for a witness, to bear witness of the Light."
- Origen: "Some try to undo the testimonies of the Prophets to Christ, by saying that the Son of God had no need of such witnesses; the wholesome words which He uttered and His miraculous acts being sufficient to produce belief; just as Moses deserved belief for his speech and goodness, and wanted no previous witnesses. To this we may reply, that, where there are a number of reasons to make people believe, persons are often impressed by one kind of proof, and not by another, and God, Who for the sake of all men became man, can give them many reasons for belief in Him. And with respect to the doctrine of the Incarnation, certain it is that some have been forced by the Prophetical writings into an admiration of Christ by the fact of so many prophets having, before His advent, fixed the place of His nativity; and by other proofs of the same kind. It is to be remembered too, that, though the display of miraculous powers might stimulate the faith of those who lived in the same age with Christ, they might, in the lapse of time, fail to do so; as some of them might even get to be regarded as fabulous. Prophecy and miracles together are more convincing than simply past miracles by themselves. We must recollect too that men receive honour themselves from the witness which they bear to God. He deprives the Prophetical choir of immeasurable honour, whoever denies that it was their office to bear witness to Christ. John when he comes to bear witness to the light, follows in the train of those who went before him."
- Chrysostom: "Not because the light wanted the testimony, but for the reason which John himself gives, viz. that all might believe on Him. For as He put on flesh to save all men from death; so He sent before Him a human preacher, that the sound of a voice like their own, might the readier draw men to Him."
- Bede: "He saith not, that all men should believe in him; for, cursed be the man that trusteth in man; (Jeremiah 17:5) but, that all men through him might believe; i. e. by his testimony believe in the Light."
- Theophylact of Ohrid: "Though some however might not believe, he is not accountable for them. When a man shuts himself up in a dark room, so as to receive no light from the sun’s rays, he is the cause of the deprivation, not the sun. In like manner John was sent, that all men might believe; but if no such result followed, he is not the cause of the failure."

Preceded by John 1:6	Gospel of John; Chapter 1	Succeeded by John 1:8
