= John 1:8 =

- ← 1:7 1:9 →
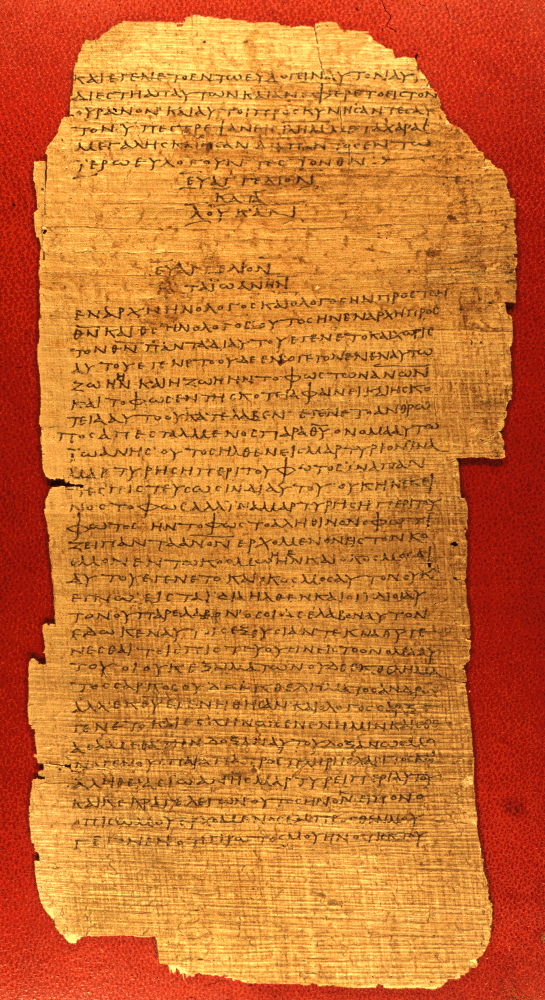
- John 1:1–16 in Papyrus 75 (AD 175–225)
- Book: Gospel of John
- Christian Bible part: New Testament

John 1:8 is the eighth verse in the first chapter of the Gospel of John in the New Testament of the Christian Bible.

== Content ==
In the original Greek according to Westcott-Hort this verse is:

Οὐκ ἦν ἐκεῖνος τὸ φῶς, ἀλλ᾿ ἵνα μαρτυρήσῃ περὶ τοῦ φωτός.

In the King James Version of the Bible, the text reads:

He was not that Light, but was sent to bear witness of that Light.

The New International Version translates the passage as:

He himself was not the light; he came only as a witness to the light.

== Analysis ==
According to Robert Witham, "He" refers to John, that he was not the true light, since the word was the light, which is expressed as the true light, to bar anyone from thinking that John the Baptist was the light. For Heinrich Meyer, ἦν in the Greek text (ēn) "is emphatic, and is therefore placed in the front: he was not the Light", while "in the second clause, μαρτυρήσῃ (marturēsē) emphatically takes the lead".

René Kieffer notes that John was "only" a witness, and that Jesus, during his ministry (John 5:36), asserts that his own testimony is greater than John's.

D. A. Carson notes that the verse's emphatic denial that the Baptist "was not the light" has led many scholars to suggest that the Evangelist wrote it to counter a group who held that John the Baptist was himself the final revelation of God and that Christians had wrongly elevated Jesus in his place. Carson observes that, while Acts 19:1–7 and later sources show that some people associated themselves with John's baptism, it is not clear that they actually opposed Christian claims; and he stresses that the Fourth Gospel's overall portrait of the Baptist is highly favourable, in line with Matthew 11:2–15, which likewise grounds his significance in his testimony to Jesus. The negative clause may simply prepare the way for John 1:9, and that it forms part of a construction that stresses the certainty of the divine plan; at the risk of over-translation, he renders the verse "He was not the light, but it was necessary that he bear witness to the light."

Craig S. Keener observes that the Gospel later describes John not as the light but as a temporary "lamp" (John 5:35). Keener notes that handheld Herodian lamps, which quickly depleted their oil, were no match for the celestial lights, and that the passive verb "kindled" implies that the initiative for John's mission did not originate with John himself (compare John 1:6); Jewish tradition had already described Elijah's message as coming "burning like a lamp" (Sirach 48:1), which Keener thinks is probably in view.

Keener notes that Jewish teachers regularly called particularly righteous persons "lights", among them Abraham, Moses, David, and ultimately the Messiah, and applied the designation also to Israel, Jerusalem, the temple, and to God himself (compare John 5:35; Matthew 5:14). Against that background, the Evangelist's careful denial places John among such derived lights rather than identifying him with the light itself. He reads the denial as a foil: in contrast to John, who was merely a lamp, the next verse presents Jesus as the genuine or "true" light itself (John 1:9).

== Commentary from the Church Fathers ==
Thomas Aquinas assembled the following quotations regarding this verse from the early Fathers of the Church:

- Chrysostom: "Forasmuch however as with us, the one who witnesses, is commonly a more important, a more trustworthy person, than the one to whom he bears witness, to do away with any such notion in the present case the Evangelist proceeds; He was not that Light, but was sent to bear witness of that Light. If this were not his intention, in repeating the words, to bear witness of the Light, the addition would be superfluous, and rather a verbal repetition, than the explanation of a truth."
- Theophylact of Ohrid: "But it will be said, that we do not allow John or any of the saints to be or ever to have been light. The difference is this: If we call any of the saints light, we put light without the article. So if asked whether John is light, without the article, thou mayest allow without hesitation that he is: if with the article, thou allow it not. For he is not very, original, light, but is only called so, on account of his partaking of the light, which cometh from the true Light."

Preceded by John 1:7	Gospel of John; Chapter 1	Succeeded by John 1:9
