= John 1:6 =

- ← 1:5 1:7 →
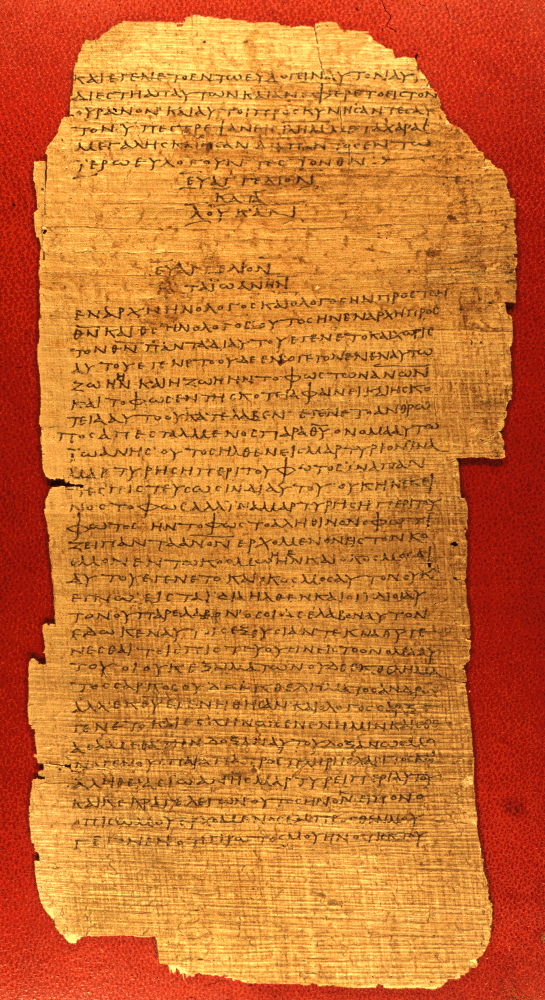
- John 1:1–16 in Papyrus 75 (AD 175–225)
- Book: Gospel of John
- Christian Bible part: New Testament

John 1:6 is the sixth verse in the first chapter of the Gospel of John in the New Testament of the Christian Bible.

== Content ==
In the original Greek according to Westcott-Hort, this verse is:

Ἐγένετο ἄνθρωπος ἀπεσταλμένος παρὰ Θεοῦ, ὄνομα αὐτῷ Ἰωάννης.

In the King James Version of the Bible the text reads:

There was a man sent from God, whose name was John.

The New International Version translates the passage as:

There came a man who was sent from God; his name was John.

In classical Greek, the words "παρὰ Θεοῦ" (para theou) mean "from God", whereas in later Greek, they would mean "by God".

Unlike the majority of translations, the New Living Translation identifies John as "John the Baptist".

== Analysis ==
D. A. Carson observes that the Fourth Gospel is the only one that introduces John without any further description such as "the Baptist", even though its author is otherwise careful to distinguish characters who share a name (for example "Judas (not Judas Iscariot)" at John 14:22). Carson explains that no such qualifier is needed here because the Gospel never names the only other John in Jesus' circle, John the son of Zebedee; on the traditional view, which Carson follows, that John was responsible for the Gospel and preferred to refer to himself only obliquely.

Irish Archbishop John McEvilly reflects that the object of John here seems to be to correct a prevailing error that the Baptist was the Messiah (Luke 3:15; John 1:19). While doing this he refers to John, who was commonly thought to be a Prophet (Matthew 21:26), as a key witness to prove that Jesus was the Christ, "the Son of God", for this was the chief aim of this gospel (John 20:31).

Henry Alford suggests that "sent by God" may refer back to Malachi 3:1: Behold, I send My messenger.

Carson notes that John's significance is grounded in his having been "sent from God", that is, commissioned to a specific task. This places him in the same category as Moses (Exodus 3:10–15) and the prophets (for example Isaiah 6:8; Jeremiah 1:4–5), and in this respect likens him to Jesus, who in the Fourth Gospel is also repeatedly said to have been sent from God (John 3:17).

Because both John and Jesus are said to be "sent from God", some have argued that the expression, when applied to Jesus, need not imply his pre-existence, since none could be claimed for John. Carson responds that, quite apart from the broader context, the passive form of the verb is used of John (John 1:6; John 3:28) while the active is reserved for Jesus, an observation he credits to Leon Morris; the pre-existence of Jesus is in any case already established by the prologue on other grounds. Craig S. Keener likewise notes that John's being "sent" from God fits the Gospel's wider theme of the divinely commissioned agent, while also reflecting the tradition that John fulfilled the messenger of Malachi 3:1 (compare Luke 7:27).

Keener observes that, in a prologue otherwise concerned with the cosmic and pre-existent Christ, the lines about John (verses 6 to 8, with verse 15) stand out, and that most attempts to reconstruct an underlying hymn behind the prologue treat them as a later addition. He suggests that these lines were nonetheless present from the time the prologue became part of the Gospel, serving to connect it to the historical ministry that begins at John 1:19; like the Gospel of Mark and the early preaching summarised in Acts, the Fourth Gospel begins its narrative of Jesus with John the Baptist.

== Commentary from the Church Fathers ==
Thomas Aquinas assembled the following quotations regarding this verse from the early Fathers of the Church:

- Augustine: "What is said above, refers to the Divinity of Christ. He came to us in the form of man, but man in such sense, as that the Godhead was concealed within Him. And therefore there was sent before a great man, to declare by his witness that He was more than man. And who was this? He was a man."
- Theophylact of Ohrid: "Not an Angel, as many have held. The Evangelist here refutes such a notion."
- Augustine: "And how could he declare the truth concerning God, unless he were sent from God."
- Chrysostom: "After this esteem nothing that he says as human; for he speaketh not his own, but his that sent him. And therefore the Prophet calls him a messenger, I send My messenger, (Malachi 3:1) for it is the excellence of a messenger, to say nothing of his own. But the expression, was sent, does not mean his entrance into life, but to his office. As Esaias was sent on his commission, not from any place out of the world, but from where he saw the Lord sitting upon His high and lofty throne; (Isai. 6:1.) in like manner John was sent from the desert to baptize; for he says, He that sent me to baptize with water, the same said unto me, Upon Whom thou shalt see the Spirit descending, and remaining on Him, the same is He which baptizeth with the Holy Ghost. (John 1:33)"
- Augustine: "What was he called? whose name was John?"
- Alcuin: "That is, the grace of God, or one in whom is grace, who by his testimony first made known to the world the grace of the New Testament, that is, Christ. Or John may be taken to mean, to whom it is given: because that through the grace of God, to him it was given, not only to herald, but also to baptize the King of kings."

Preceded by John 1:5	Gospel of John; Chapter 1	Succeeded by John 1:7
