= John 1:4 =

- ← 1:3 1:5 →
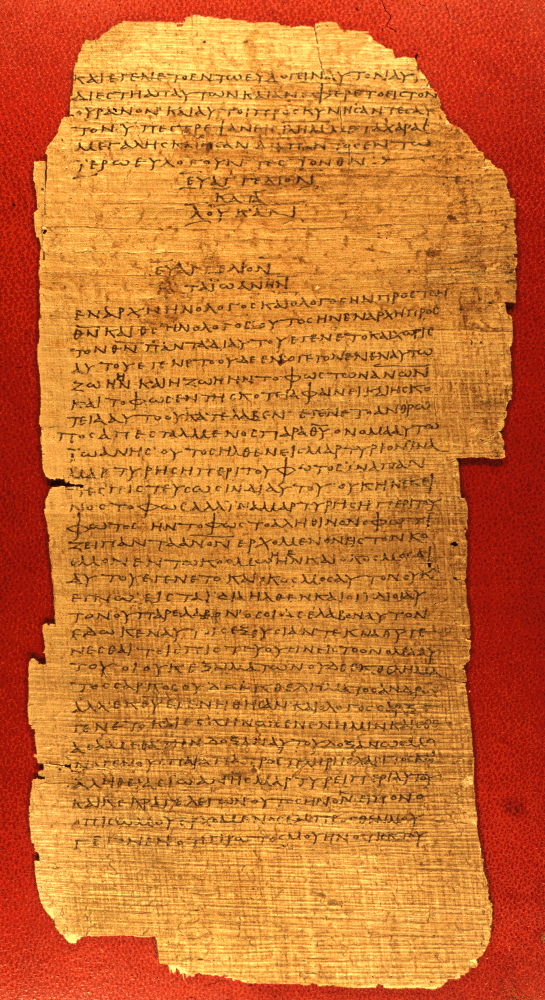
- John 1:1–16 in Papyrus 75 (AD 175–225)
- Book: Gospel of John
- Christian Bible part: New Testament

John 1:4 is the fourth verse in the first chapter of the Gospel of John in the New Testament of the Christian Bible.

== Content ==
In the original Greek according to Westcott-Hort, this verse is:

Ἐν αὐτῷ ζωὴ ἦν, καὶ ἡ ζωὴ ἦν τὸ φῶς τῶν ἀνθρώπων,
En autō zōē ēn, kai hē zōē ēn to phōs tōn anthrōpōn.

In the King James Version of the Bible the text reads:

In him was life; and the life was the light of men.

The New International Version translates the passage as:

In him was life, and that life was the light of men.

== Analysis ==
According to Robert Witham, "In him:" i.e. in this word, was life because he gives life to everything, or of the spiritual life, that is, lights of graces, which he gives to Christians.

There appears to be an allusion in this verse to Psalm 36: “For with you is the fountain of life; in your light do we see light” (Psalm 36:9)

The theologian René Kieffer notes that ὃ γέγονεν in verse 3 (ho gegonen) should "probably" be read with this verse. Thus, the English Standard Version offers an alternative translation:

All things were made through him, and without him was not any thing made. That which has been made was life in him, and the life was the light of men.

See also the second quotation from Origen below.

D. A. Carson draws attention to the formal parallel between this verse and John 5:26 ("as the Father has life in himself, so he has granted the Son to have life in himself"), arguing that the relationship between God and the Word in the prologue is the same as the relationship between the Father and the Son in the rest of the Gospel: both verses insist that the Word, or Son, shares in the self-existing life of God. Jesus later claims to be both the light (John 8:12; John 9:5) and the life (John 11:25; John 14:6). Carson adds that both Wisdom and the Torah are commonly associated with life and light in Jewish sources, associations John ties to Christ, the Word.

Carson notes that, whereas elsewhere in the Gospel John is mainly interested in "light" and "life" as they relate to salvation, this verse, read in the context of the first three, more likely relates the life inhering in the Word to creation: the self-existing life of the Word was so dispensed at creation that it became "the light of the human race". Carson leaves open whether John has in view

- The human constitution as made in the image of God (compare Genesis 1:27)
- A reflection of the Word in the created order (what is sometimes called general revelation, compare Romans 1:20)
- The more specific revelation bound up with the coming of the Son.

In this verse, John is more concerned with the source of the light, the life of the Word, and its purpose, for the human race, than with the manner of its dispersal.

Craig S. Keener observes that, because John identifies "life" with "light" (John 8:12) and "light" refers in context to Christ (John 1:9), at a functional level the "life" of this verse is ultimately Jesus himself (John 11:25; John 14:6). Keener notes that this verse introduces two motifs that recur throughout the Gospel: the theme of "life", which appears some thirty-five times, and the light/darkness contrast that follows in John 1:5 and reappears regularly, sometimes carrying symbolic weight in the narrative (as with Nicodemus coming by night). He observes that verses 4 and 5 form a chained construction (life, life, light, light, darkness, darkness) of a kind known as a sorites, a pattern also found in Wisdom 6:17–20, and stresses that for John "life" and "light" are not abstractions, since the Life raises Lazarus (John 11:25) and the Light gives sight to the blind (John 9:5).

On the background of the imagery, Keener notes that although a light/darkness dualism figures heavily in Gnosticism, it is no less pervasive in earlier sources, and that it was the Dead Sea Scrolls that decisively moved New Testament scholars away from seeking a gnostic background for John's light and darkness language; like John, the Scrolls use "day" figuratively with "light" and "night" with "darkness".

== Commentary from the Church Fathers ==
Thomas Aquinas assembled the following quotations regarding this verse from the early Fathers of the Church:

- Bede: "The Evangelist having said that every creature was made by the Word, lest perchance any one might think that His will was changeable, as though He willed on a sudden to make a creature, which from eternity he had not made; he took care to show that, though a creature was made in time, in the Wisdom of the Creator it had been from eternity arranged what and when He should create."
- Augustine: "The passage can be read thus: What was made in Him was life. Therefore the whole universe is life: for what was there not made in Him? He is the Wisdom of God, as is said, In Wisdom hast Thou made them all. All things therefore are made in Him, even as they are by Him. But, if whatever was made in Him is life, the earth is life, a stone is life. We must not interpret it so unsoundly, lest the sect of the Manicheans creep in upon us, and say, that a stone has life, and that a wall has life; for they do insanely assert so, and when reprehended or refuted, appeal as though to Scripture, and ask, why was it said, That which was made in Him was life? Read the passage then thus: make the stop after What was made, and then proceed, In Him was life. The earth was made; but, the earth itself which was made is not life. In the Wisdom of God however there is spiritually a certain Reason after which the earth is made. This is Life. A chest in workmanship is not life, a chest in art is, inasmuch as the mind of the workman lives wherein that original pattern exists. And in this sense the Wisdom of God, by Which all things are made, containeth in art ‘all things which are made, according to that art.’ And therefore whatever is made, is not in itself life, but is life in Him."
- Augustine: "Life of itself gives illumination to men, but to cattle not: for they have not rational souls, by which to discern wisdom: whereas man, being made in the image of God, has a rational soul, by which he can discern wisdom. Hence that life, by which all things are made, is light, not however of all animals whatsoever, but of men."
- Origen: "It may also be divided thus: That which was made in him; and then, was life; the sense being, that all things that were made by Him and in Him, are life in Him, and are one in Him. They were, that is, in Him; they exist as the cause, before they exist in themselves as effects. If thou ask how and in what manner all things which were made by the Word subsist in Him vitally, immutably, causally, take some examples from the created world. See how that all things within the arch of the world of sense have their causes simultaneously and harmoniously subsisting in that sun which is the greatest luminary of the world: how multitudinous crops of herbs and fruits are contained in single seeds: how the most complex variety of rules, in the art of the artificer, and the mind of the director, are a living unit, how an infinite number of lines coexist in one point. Contemplate these several instances, and thou wilt be able as it were on the wings of physical science, to penetrate with thy intellectual eye the secrets of the Word, and as far as is allowed to a human understanding, to see how all things which were made by the Word, live in Him, and were made in Him."
- Origen: "Or thus: Our Saviour is said to be some things not for Himself, but for others; others again, both for Himself and others. When it is said then, That which was made in Him was life; we must enquire whether the life is for Himself and others, or for others only; and if for others, for whom? Now the Life and the Light are both the same Person: He is the light of men: He is therefore their life. The Saviour is called Life here, not to Himself, but to others; whose Light He also is. This life is inseparable from the Word, from the time it is added on to it. For Reason or the Word must exist before in the soul, cleansing it from sin, till it is pure enough to receive the life, which is thus ingrafted or inborn in every one who renders himself fit to receive the Word of God. Hence observe, that though the Word itself in the beginning was not made, the Beginning never having been without the Word; yet the life of men was not always in the Word. This life of men was made, in that It was the light of men; and this light of men could not be before man was; the light of men being understood relatively to men. And therefore he says, That which was made in the Word was life; not That which was in the Word was life. Some copies read, not amiss, "That which was made, in Him is life." If we understand the life in the Word, to be He who says below, ‘I am the life,’ we shall confess that none who believe not in Christ live, and that all who live not in God, are dead. (John 11:25; 14:6)"
- Origen: "We must not omit to notice, that he puts the life before the light of men. For it would be a contradiction to suppose a being without life to be illuminated; as if life were an addition to illumination. But to proceed: if the life was the light of men, meaning men only, Christ is the light and the life of men only; an heretical supposition. It does not follow then, when a thing is predicated of any, that it is predicated of those only; for of God it is written, that He is the God of Abraham, Isaac, and Jacob; and yet He is not the God of those fathers only. In the same way, the light of men is not excluded from being the light of others as well. Some moreover contend from Genesis, (Genesis 1:26) Let us make man after our image, that man means whatever is made after the image and similitude of God. If so, the light of men is the light of any rational creature whatever."
- Hilary of Poitiers: "Or it can be understood thus. In that he had said, without Him was not any thing made, one might have been perplexed, and have asked, Was then any thing made by another, which yet was not made without Him? if so, then though nothing is made without, all things are not made by Him: it being one thing to make, another to be with the maker. On this account the Evangelist declares what it was which was not made without Him, viz. what was made in Him. This then it was which was not made without Him, viz. what was made in Him. And that which was made in Him, was also made by Him. For all things were created in Him and by Him. Now things were made in Him, because He was born God the Creator. And for this reason also things that were made in Him, were not made without Him, viz. that God, in that He was born, was life, and He who was life, was not made life after being born. Nothing then which was made in Him, was made without Him, because He was life, in Whom they were made; because God Who was born of God was God, not after, but in that He was born."
- Theophylact of Ohrid: "He had said, In him was life, that you might not suppose that the Word was without life. Now he shows that life is spiritual, and the light of all reasonable creatures. And the life was the light of men: i.e. not sensible, but intellectual light, illuminating the very soul."
- Theophylact of Ohrid: "He saith not, the Light of the Jews only, but of all men: for all of us, in so far as we have received intellect and reason, from that Word which created us, are said to be illuminated by Him. For the reason which is given to us, and which constitutes us the reasonable beings we are, is a light directing us what to do, and what not to do."

Preceded by John 1:3	Gospel of John; Chapter 1	Succeeded by John 1:5
