= John 1:2 =

- ← 1:1 1:3 →
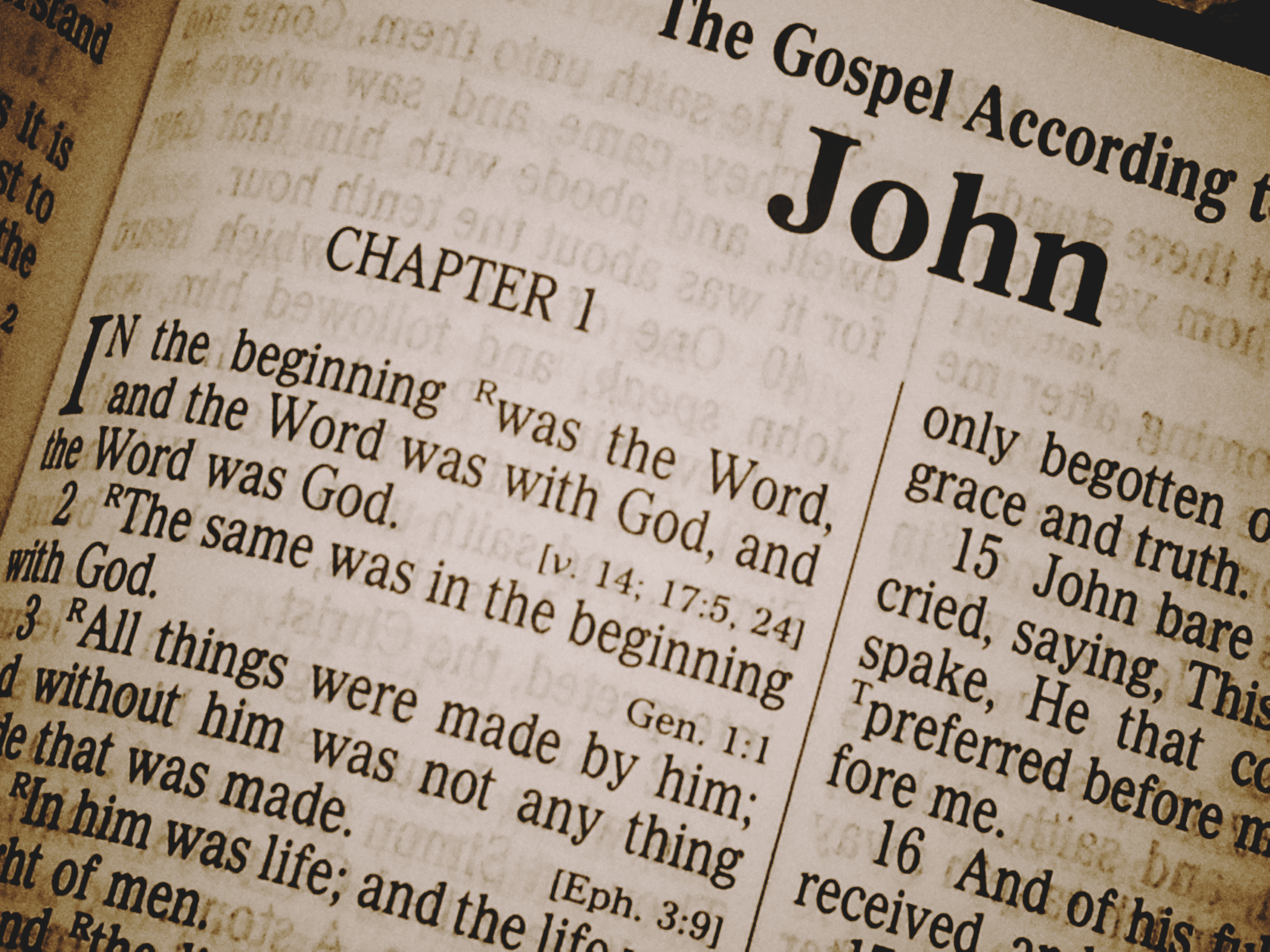
- John 1:1–3 in the page showing the first chapter of John in the King James Bible
- Book: Gospel of John
- Christian Bible part: New Testament

John 1:2 is the second verse in the first chapter of the Gospel of John in the New Testament of the Christian Bible.

== Content ==
In the original Greek according to Westcott-Hort, this verse is:

Οὗτος ἦν ἐν ἀρχῇ πρὸς τὸν Θεόν.
Outos ēn en archē pros ton Theon.

In the King James Version of the Bible the text reads:

The same was in the beginning with God.

The New International Version translates the passage as:

He was with God in the beginning.

== Analysis ==
The author alludes to, or echoes, Genesis 1:1, "In the beginning...", but unlike in Genesis, his concern is with what was before the creation. There is also an allusion to Proverbs 8:22, "The Lord possessed me in the beginning of His ways, before He made anything, from the beginning". For the German Protestant writer Heinrich Meyer, this verse "emphatically combines the first and second clauses of John 1:1 (In the beginning was the Word, and the Word was with God) in order to connect them with the work of creation". He adds that these words form the "necessary premiss" for verse 3, All things were made through Him ..., so that it can be stated that "if it was this same Logos, and no other than He, who Himself was God, who lived in the beginning in fellowship with God, and consequently when creation began, [then] the whole creation, nothing excepted, must have come into existence through Him. Craig S. Keener further situates the language against early Jewish wisdom traditions, in which Wisdom was celebrated as existing "in the beginning" and in which Wisdom, the Torah, and the Logos could each be called "the beginning", an idea Jewish teachers drew from Proverbs 8:22. He suggests that John stretches this familiar language to new bounds in order to communicate the identity of Jesus through an existing point of contact, comparing the way Paul had used terms such as "image" and "firstborn" in Colossians 1:15–20.

Keener observes that, taken together with verse 1, this verse completes a chiasm that opens the prologue, the closing phrase "in the beginning with God" (verse 2) mirroring the opening "in the beginning" (verse 1). He notes, following the French scholar Marie-Émile Boismard, that the three clauses of verse 1 are also linked by a Semitic device of anadiplosis, each clause taking up the last word of the one before (Word ... Word, God ... God). He regards the allusion to Genesis 1:1 as certain: the phrase "in the beginning" echoes the opening of Genesis and points to the literal beginning of creation, an allusion developed the following verse which speaks of all things being made through the Word (John 1:3).

D. A. Carson likewise treats the verse as a deliberate restatement of verse 1 rather than a mere repetition. Because the highly condensed verse 1 could be misread, the Evangelist "works backward" to make plain that the Word who is God is the same one who was "in the beginning" and "with (πρός, pros) God"; Carson notes that the verse specifically reiterates the middle clause of verse 1, that the Word was with God, and so prepares the way for the statement about creation in John 1:3.

Robert Witham notes that although the text has "this (ουτος) was in the beginning", the sense and construction is, "this word was in the beginning".

This verse is often used to confute Arianism, which holds that God was created in the beginning, while this verse seems to imply that the word (λογος) simply existed in the beginning, and therefore always existed. Cornelius a Lapide asks the question why a beginning is spoken of at all, if the word (λογος) is eternal and has no beginning. To this he answers, "because of the weakness of the human intellect, which is not able to comprehend eternity". Keener reads verse 2 as a recapitulation, for emphasis, of the intimacy of Father and Son "in the beginning" at creation (compare John 1:3; John 8:58). On his reading the verse carries a theological point developed across the Gospel: because the Word was eternally with God, those who reject the incarnate Jesus reject God himself; Jesus did not "make himself" God (John 10:33) but shared glory with the Father before the world began (John 17:5).

== Commentary from the Church Fathers ==
Thomas Aquinas assembled the following quotations regarding this verse from the early Fathers of the Church:

- Hilary of Poitiers: "Whereas he had said, the Word was God, the fearfulness, and strangeness of the speech disturbed me; the prophets having declared that God was One. But, to quiet my apprehensions, the fisherman reveals the scheme of this so great mystery, and refers all to one, without dishonour, without obliterating [the Person], without reference to time, saying, The Same was in the beginning with God; with One Unbegotten God, from whom He is, the One Only-begotten God."
- Theophylact of Ohrid: "Again, to stop any diabolical suspicion, that the Word, because He was God, might have rebelled against His Father, as certain Gentiles fable, or, being separate, have become the antagonist of the Father Himself, he says, The Same was in the beginning with God; that is to say, this Word of God never existed separate from God."
- Chrysostom: "Or, lest hearing that In the beginning was the Word, you should regard It as eternal, but yet understand the Father’s Life to have some degree of priority, he has introduced the words, The Same was in the beginning with God. For God was never solitary, apart from Him, but always God with God. . Or forasmuch as he said, the Word was God, that no one might think the Divinity of the Son inferior, he immediately subjoins the marks of proper Divinity, in that he both again mentions Eternity, The Same was in the beginning with God; and adds His attribute of Creator (τδ δημιουργικὸν), All things were made by Him."
- Origen: "Or thus, the Evangelist having begun with those propositions, reunites them into one, saying, The Same was in the beginning with God. For in the first of the three we learnt in what the Word was, that it was in the beginning; in the second, with whom, with God; in the third who the Word was, God. Having, then, by the term, The Same, set before us in a manner God the Word of Whom he had spoken, he collects all into the fourth proposition, viz. In the beginning was the Word, and the Word was with God, and the Word was God; into, the Same was in the beginning with God. It may be asked, however, why it is not said, In the beginning was the Word of God, and the Word of God was with God, and the Word of God was God? Now whoever will admit that truth is one, must needs admit also that the demonstration of truth, that is wisdom, is one. But if truth is one, and wisdom is one, the Word which enuntiates [sic?] truth and developes [sic?] wisdom in those who are capable of receiving it, must be One also. And therefore it would have been out of place here to have said, the Word of God, as if there were other words besides that of God, a word of angels, word of men, and so on. We do not say this, to deny that It is the Word of God, but to show the use of omitting the word God. John himself too in the Apocalypse says, And his Name is called the Word of God. (Rev. 19:13)"
- Alcuin: "Wherefore does he use the substantive verb, was? That you might understand that the Word, Which is coeternal with God the Father, was before all time."

Preceded by John 1:1	Gospel of John; Chapter 1	Succeeded by John 1:3
