= John 1:3 =

- ← 1:2 1:4 →
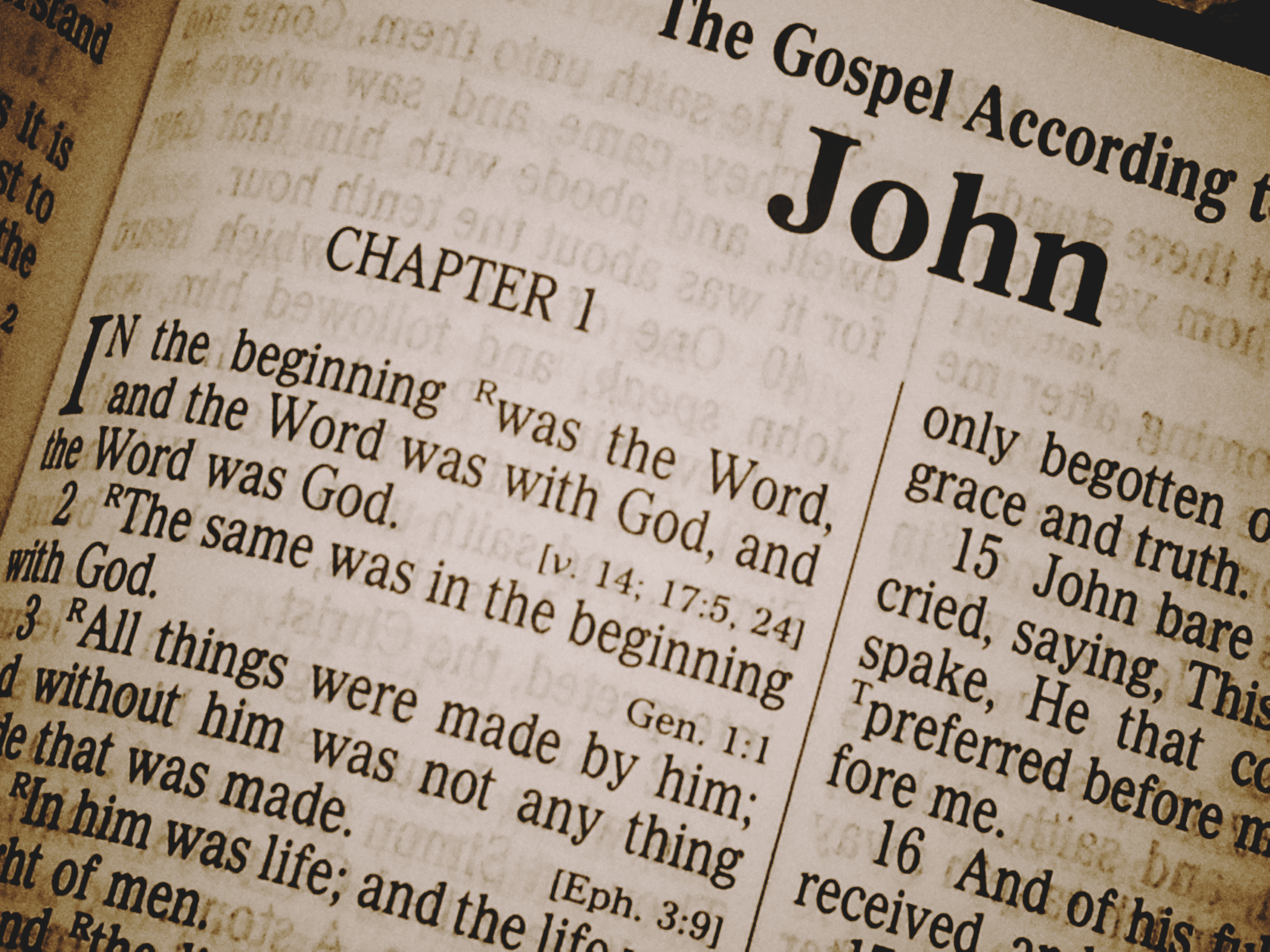
- John 1:1–3 in the page showing the first chapter of John in the King James Bible
- Book: Gospel of John
- Christian Bible part: New Testament

John 1:3 is the third verse in the first chapter of the Gospel of John in the New Testament of the Christian Bible.

== Content ==
In the original Greek according to Westcott-Hort this verse is:

Πάντα δι᾿ αὐτοῦ ἐγένετο, καὶ χωρὶς αὐτοῦ ἐγένετο οὐδὲ ἓν ὃ γέγονεν.
Panta di’ autou egeneto, kai chōris autou egeneto oude hen ho gegonen.

In the King James Version of the Bible the text reads:

All things were made by him; and without him was not any thing made that was made.

The New International Version translates the passage as:

Through him all things were made; without him nothing was made that has been made.

== Analysis ==
This verse is part of the gospel's "Hymn to the Word" (John 1:1-18), which deals with the divinity, incarnation and authority of Jesus.

Commentators note a long-standing question of punctuation: whether the last two words of the Greek text, ὃ γέγονεν (ho gegonen, "that which was made"), should be read with verse 3 (as in the King James and New International Versions, "without him was not any thing made that was made") or taken as the opening of John 1:4 (as in the New English Bible, "no single thing was created without him. All that came to be was alive with his life"). D. A. Carson observes that Kurt Aland argued strongly for attaching the words to verse 4, the punctuation that prevailed in the early church among both orthodox and heterodox writers, but Carson follows Rudolf Schnackenburg in reading them with verse 3, noting among other things that John regularly begins sentences with the preposition "in", as verse 4 then would. Craig S. Keener likewise notes that the Church Fathers and later punctuated manuscripts favoured attaching the phrase to verse 4, but concludes that the context contributes more to the sense than the syntax does.

Keener observes that, while various Greek cosmological parallels have been proposed, the Dead Sea Scrolls offer verbal parallels to John 1:3 that are at least as striking; the Community Rule from Qumran declares that "apart from his counsel nothing is performed" and that "from God were all things made".

Keener notes that for John the Word is God's sole agent of creation, and that the phrase "all things" (πάντα, panta) emphasises the priority, and so the supremacy, of Jesus over everything created, and hence over all humanity (John 1:10; John 17:2). He sees the verse as affirming what the earliest, probably pre-Pauline, Christian creedal formulas had already affirmed within the first decades of the church: that Jesus is the Father's agent in creation (1 Corinthians 8:6; Colossians 1:15–17), identified with incarnate Wisdom.

Carson observes that the verse insists, both positively ("through him all things were made") and negatively ("without him nothing was made that has been made"), that the Word was God's agent in the creation of everything that exists; he reads the shift in tense, from "were made" to "has been made", as a shift from the act of creation to the resulting state of creation. As in Genesis, where everything comes into being through God's spoken word, and as in Proverbs 3:19 and Proverbs 8:30, where personified Wisdom is the means by which all things exist, so here the Word, understood as a personal agent, created everything.

Most Christian scholars agree that these words teach us, that all created things, visible, or invisible, were made by this eternal word, that is the Son of God. In the words of St. Augustine, He made "all things, from an angel to a worm".

This verse is also expanded in Colossians 1:16, “By Him,” i.e., the Word, “were all things created, that are in heaven, and that are in earth, visible and invisible, whether they be thrones, or dominions, or principalities, or powers: all things were created by Him, and for Him.” Carson adds that, although the application of the title "Word" to the agent of creation is restricted to this passage, the idea that the pre-existent Christ created everything is a common New Testament theme, appearing also in Colossians 1:16–17, Hebrews 1:2, and Revelation 3:14. Quoting F. F. Bruce, Carson notes that no literary dependence is probable among these passages, so that "the teaching which they convey is antecedent to them all and therefore impressively primitive".

== Commentary from the Church Fathers ==
Thomas Aquinas assembled the following quotations regarding this verse from the early Fathers of the Church:

- Alcuin: "After speaking of the nature of the Son, he proceeds to His operations, saying, All things were made by him, i.e. everything whether substance, or property."
- Hilary of Poitiers: "Or thus: [It is said], the Word indeed was in the beginning, but it may be that He was not before the beginning. But what saith he; All things were made by him. He is infinite by Whom everything, which is, was made: and since all things were made by Him, time is likewise."
- Augustine: "How then can the Word of God be made, when God by the Word made all things? For if the Word Itself were made, by what other Word was It made? If you say it was the Word of the Word by Which That was made, that Word I call the Only-Begotten Son of God. But if thou dost not call It the Word of the Word1, then grant that that Word was not made, by which all things were made."
- Augustine: "And if It is not made, It is not a creature; but if It is not a creature, It is of the same Substance with the Father. For every substance which is not God is a creature; and what is not a creature is God."
- Augustine: "Or, by saying, without Him was not anything made, he tells us not to suspect Him in any sense to be a thing made. For how can He be a thing made, when God, it is said, made nothing without Him?"
- Augustine: "For sin was not made by Him; for it is manifest that sin is nothing, and that men become nothing when they sin. Nor was an idol made by the Word. It has indeed a sort of form of man, and man himself was made by the Word; but the form of man in an idol was not made by the Word: for it is written, we know that an idol is nothing. (1 Cor. 8:4) These then were not made by the Word; but whatever things were made naturally, the whole universe, were; every creature from an angel to a worm."
- Augustine: "The folly of those men is not to be listened to, who think nothing is to be understood here as something, because it is placed at the end of the sentence1: as if it made any difference whether it was said, without Him nothing was made, or, without Him was made nothing."
- Augustine: "Since all things were made by him, it is evident that light was also, when God said, Let there be light. And in like manner the rest. But if so, that which God said, viz. Let there be light, is eternal. For the Word of God, God with God, is coeternal with the Father, though the world created by Him be temporal. For whereas our when and are sometimes words of time, in the Word of God, on the contrary, when a thing ought to be made, is eternal; and the thing is then made, when in that Word it is that it ought to be made, which Word hath in It neither when, or at sometimes, since It is all eternal."
- Chrysostom: "Moses indeed, in the beginning of the Old Testament, speaks to us in much detail of the natural world, saying, In the beginning God made the heaven and the earth; and then relates how that the light, and the firmament, and the stars, and the various kinds of animals were created. But the Evangelist sums up the whole of this in a word, as familiar to his hearers; and hastens to loftier matter, making the whole of his book to bear not on the works, but on the Maker."
- Chrysostom: "If the preposition by perplex thee, and thou wouldest learn from Scripture that the Word Itself made all things, hear David, Thou, Lord, in the beginning hast laid the foundation of the earth, and the heavens are the work of Thy hands. That he spoke this of the Only-Begotten, you learn from the Apostle, who in the Epistle to the Hebrews applies these words to the Son."
- Chrysostom: "But if you say that the prophet spoke this of the Father, and that Paul applied it to the Son, it comes to the same thing. For he would not have mentioned that as applicable to the Son, unless he fully considered that the Father and the Son were of equal dignity. If again thou dream that in the preposition by any subjection is implied, why does Paul use t of the Father? as, God is faithful, by Whom ye were called into the fellowship of His Son; (1 Cor. 1:9) and again, Paul an Apostle by the will of God. (2 Cor. 1:1)"
- Chrysostom: "That you may not suppose, when he says, All things were made by Him, that he meant only the things Moses had spoken of, he seasonably brings in, And without Him was not anything made, nothing, that is, cognizable either by the senses, or the understanding. Or thus; Lest you should suspect the sentence, All things were made by Him, to refer to the miracles which the other Evangelists had related, he adds, and without Him was not anything made."
- Origen: "Here too Valentinus errs, saying, that the Word supplied to the Creator the cause of the creation of the world. If this interpretation is true, it should have been written that all things had their existence from the Word through the Creator, not contrariwise, through the Word from the Creator."
- Origen: "Or thus, that thou mightest not think that the things made by the Word had a separate existence, and were not contained in the Word, he says, and without Him was not anything made: that is, not anything was made externally of Him; for He encircles all things, as the Preserver of all things."
- Origen: "If all things were made by the Word, and in the number of all things is wickedness, and the whole influx of sin, these too were made by the Word; which is false. Now, ‘nothing’ and ‘a thing which is not,’ mean the same. And the Apostle seems to call wicked things, things which are not, God calleth those things which be not, (Rom. 4:17) as though they were. All wickedness then is called nothing, forasmuch as it is made without the Word. Those who say however that the devil is not a creature of God, err. In so far as he is the devil, he is not a creature of God; but he, whose character it is to be the devil, is a creature of God. It is as if we should say a murderer is not a creature of God, when, so far as he is a man, he is a creature of God."
- Origen: "Valentinus excludes from the things made by the Word, all that were made in the ages which he believes to have existed before the Word. This is plainly false; inasmuch as the things which he accounts divine are thus excluded from the “all things,” and what he deems wholly corrupt are properly ‘all things!’"
- Origen: "If ‘the word’ be taken for that which is in each man, inasmuch as it was implanted in each by the Word, which was in the beginning, then also, we commit nothing without this ‘word’ [reason] taking this word ‘nothing’ in a popular sense. For the Apostle says that sin was dead without the law, but when the commandment came, sin revived; for sin is not imputed when there is no law. But neither was there sin, when there was no Word, for our Lord says, If I had not come and spoken to them, they had not had sin. (John 15:22) For every excuse is withdrawn from the sinner, if, with the Word present, and enjoining what is to be done, he refuses to obey Him. Nor is the Word to be blamed on this account; any more than a master, whose discipline leaves no excuse open to a delinquent pupil on the ground of ignorance. All things then were made by the Word, not only the natural world, but also whatever is done by those acting without reason."
- Hilary of Poitiers: "Or thus; That all things were made by him, is pronouncing too much, it may be said. There is an Unbegotten Who is made of none, and there is the Son Himself begotten from Him Who is Unbegotten. The Evangelist however again implies the Author, when he speaks of Him as Associated; saying, without Him was not anything made. This, that nothing was made without Him, I understand to mean the Son’s not being alone, for ‘by whom’ is one thing, ‘not without whom’ another."

| Preceded by John 1:2 | Gospel of John; Chapter 1 | Succeeded by John 1:4 |
