= John 1:5 =

- ← 1:4 1:6 →
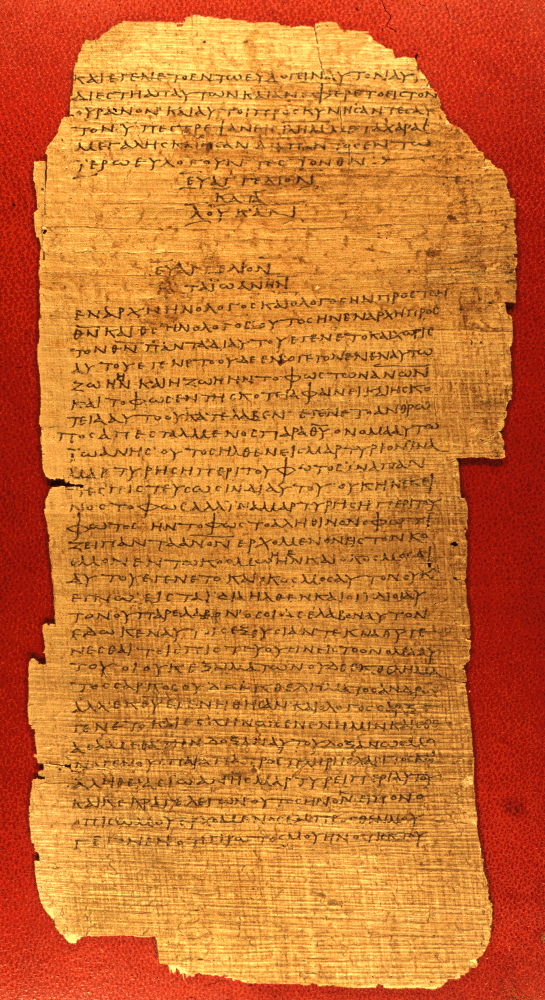
- John 1:1–16 in Papyrus 75 (AD 175–225)
- Book: Gospel of John
- Christian Bible part: New Testament

John 1:5 is the fifth verse in the first chapter of the Gospel of John in the New Testament of the Christian Bible.

== Content ==
In the original Greek according to Westcott-Hort this verse is:

καὶ τὸ φῶς ἐν τῇ σκοτίᾳ φαίνει, καὶ ἡ σκοτία αὐτὸ οὐ κατέλαβεν.

In the King James Version of the Bible the text reads:

And the light shineth in darkness; and the darkness comprehended it not.

The New International Version (NIV) translates the passage as:

The light shines in the darkness, and the darkness has not overcome it.

== Analysis ==
Many understand "the light shines in darkness" as the light of reason, which God gives to everyone, and which might have led them to the knowledge of God by his Providence in the visible world. Matthew Henry notes that the light of reason "is derived from" the Word. However "the darkness did not comprehend it", since people, blinded by their passions, could not grasp the light of reason. Or perhaps it may mean the lights of grace, "against which obstinate sinners shut their eyes." The concept of a struggle between light and darkness is expressed in the NIV wording above and similarly in the Revised Standard Version.

J. B. Phillips offers the reading "The light still shines in the darkness and the darkness has never put it out": this "persistence of light" is seen as a biblical topic embracing the Old and New Testaments and the life of the Christian Church.

The Greek word "κατέλαβεν" (katelaben) is an example of polysemy and can be equally translated as either "understand", "overtake" or "overcome". The NET (New English Translation) uses the English "mastered" to convey this polysemy.

Craig S. Keener notes that the patristic interpreters were already divided over the sense of κατέλαβεν: whether the darkness could not "apprehend" the light intellectually (Cyril of Alexandria), did not accept it, or could not "conquer" it (Origen and most Greek Fathers). Keener judges it more likely that John, whose skill in wordplay runs throughout the Gospel, has introduced a deliberate double meaning, so that the darkness fails either to comprehend the light (grasping it with the mind) or to overcome it (grasping it with the hand), a rhetorical device of playing on a single word that ancient writers called traductio.

D. A. Carson describes the verse as "a masterpiece of planned ambiguity". A reader without prior knowledge of Christianity might take it of creation alone, where darkness is merely the absence of light and "the darkness did not overcome it" affirms the victory of the created light; on this reading the prologue mentions the incarnation only from John 1:14. A reader of the whole Gospel, however, would hear the light/darkness duality that pervades the book, in which darkness is positive evil (John 3:19) and the same clause can be rendered "the darkness has not understood it", anticipating the theme of rejection in verses 10 to 11. Carson suggests John may intend his readers to see in the Word both the light of creation and the light of the redemption brought in his incarnation.

Keener observes that the past tense of κατέλαβεν probably summarises the whole of Jesus' incarnate ministry, so that the "darkness" implies the opposition he met among "the Jews" (compare John 1:11) and in the "world" they represent; one is not "overcome" by darkness if one walks in the light (John 12:35). He suggests John's language may adapt that of Wisdom 7:30, where evil cannot overpower Wisdom even though night overtakes day.

Keener notes that antithesis was a typical rhetorical form in both Greek and Jewish thought, and that darkness functions as a negative symbol across most ancient literature. The struggle between light and darkness and their respective hosts is especially evident in the Dead Sea Scrolls, where the present conflict, with darkness appearing to hold the upper hand in the world, was expected to be resolved in favour of the sons of light at the final battle. He adds that early Christians came to apply this transition from darkness to light to the believer's conversion, understood as a transfer from Satan's realm to God's (Acts 26:18; 2 Corinthians 4:6; Colossians 1:13; 1 Peter 2:9).

== Commentary from the Church Fathers ==
Thomas Aquinas assembled the following quotations regarding this verse from the early Fathers of the Church:

- Augustine: "Whereas that life is the light of men, but foolish hearts cannot receive that light, being so incumbered with sins that they cannot see it; for this cause lest any should think there is no light near them, because they cannot see it, he continues: And the light shineth in darkness, and the darkness comprehended it not. For suppose a blind man standing in the sun, the sun is present to him, but he is absent from the sun. In like manner every fool is blind, and wisdom is present to him; but, though present, absent from his sight, forasmuch as sight is gone: the truth being, not that she is absent from him, but that he is absent from her."
- Augustine: "A certain Platonist once said, that the beginning of this Gospel ought to be copied in letters of gold, and placed in the most conspicuous place in every church."
- Bede: "The other Evangelists describe Christ as born in time; John witnesseth that He was in the beginning, saying, In the beginning was the Word. The others describe His sudden appearance among men; he witnesseth that He was ever with God, saying, And the Word was with God. The others prove Him very man; he very God, saying, And the Word was God. The others exhibit Him as man conversing with men for a season; he pronounces Him God abiding with God in the beginning, saying, The Same was in the beginning with God. The others relate the great deeds which He did amongst men; he that God the Father made every creature through Him, saying, All things were made by Him, and without Him was not any thing made."
- Origen: "This kind of darkness however is not in men by nature, according to the text in the Ephesians, 'Ye were sometime darkness, but now are ye light in the Lord.' (Ephesians 5:8)"
- Origen: "Or thus, The light shineth in the darkness of faithful souls, beginning from faith, and drawing onwards to hope; but the deceit and ignorance of undisciplined souls did not comprehend the light of the Word of God shining in the flesh. That however is an ethical meaning. The metaphysical signification of the words is as follows. Human nature, even though it sinned not, could not shine by its own strength simply; for it is not naturally light, but only a recipient of it; it is capable of containing wisdom, but is not wisdom itself. As the air, of itself, shineth not, but is called by the name of darkness, even so is our nature, considered in itself, a dark substance, which however admits of and is made partaker of the light of wisdom. And as when the air receives the sun's rays, it is not said to shine of itself, but the sun's radiance to be apparent in it; so the reasonable part of our nature, while possessing the presence of the Word of God, does not of itself understand God, and intellectual things, but by means of the divine light implanted in it. Thus, The light shineth in darkness: for the Word of God, the life and the light of men, ceaseth not to shine in our nature; though regarded in itself, that nature is without form and darkness. And forasmuch as pure light cannot be comprehended by any creature, hence the text: The darkness comprehended it not."
- Origen: "But they ask, why is not the Word Itself called the light of men, instead of the life which is in the Word? We reply, that the life here spoken of is not that which rational and irrational animals have in common, but that which is annexed to the Word which is within us through participation of the primæval Word. For we must distinguish the external and false life, from the desirable and true. We are first made partakers of life: and this life with some is light potentially only, not in act; with those, viz. who are not eager to search out the things which appertain to knowledge: with others it is actual light, those who, as the Apostle saith, covet earnestly the best gifts, (1 Cor. 12:31) that is to say, the word of wisdom. . - If the life and the light of men are the same, whoso is in darkness is proved not to live, and none who liveth abideth in darkness."
- Origen: "As the light of men is a word expressing two spiritual things, so is darkness also. To one who possesses the light, we attribute both the doing the deeds of the light, and also true understanding, inasmuch as he is illuminated by the light of knowledge: and, on the other hand, the term darkness we apply both to unlawful acts, and also to that knowledge, which seems such, but is not. Now as the Father is light, and in Him is no darkness at all, so is the Saviour also. Yet, inasmuch as he underwent the similitude of our sinful flesh, it is not incorrectly said of Him, that in Him there was some darkness; for He took our darkness upon Himself, in order that He might dissipate it. This Light therefore, which was made the life of man, shines in the darkness of our hearts, when the prince of this darkness wars with the human race. This Light the darkness persecuted, as is clear from what our Saviour and His children suffer; the darkness fighting against the children of light. But, forasmuch as God takes up the cause, they do not prevail; nor do they apprehend the light, for they are either of too slow a nature to overtake the light’s quick course, or, waiting for it to come up to them, they are put to flight at its approach. We should bear in mind, however, that darkness is not always used in a bad sense, but sometimes in a good, as in Psalm 17. He made darkness His secret place: (Ps. 18:11) the things of God being unknown and incomprehensible. This darkness then I will call praiseworthy, since it tends toward light, and lays hold on it: for, though it were darkness before, while it was not known, yet it is turned to light and knowledge in him who has learned."
- Chrysostom: "Or thus: throughout the whole foregoing passage he had been speaking of creation; then he mentions the spiritual benefits which the Word brought with it: and the life was the light of men. He saith not, the light of Jews, but of all men without exception; for not the Jews only, but the Gentiles also have come to this knowledge. The Angels he omits, for he is speaking of human nature, to whom the Word came bringing glad tidings."
- Chrysostom: "Life having come to us, the empire of death is dissolved; a light having shone upon us, there is darkness no longer: but there remaineth ever a life which death, a light which darkness cannot overcome. Whence he continues, And the light shineth in darkness: by darkness meaning death and error, for sensible light does not shine in darkness, but darkness must be removed first; whereas the preaching of Christ shone forth amidst the reign of error, and caused it to disappear, and Christ by dying changed death into life, so overcoming it, that, those who were already in its grasp, were brought back again. Forasmuch then as neither death nor error hath overcome his light, which is every where conspicuous, shining forth by its own strength; therefore he adds, And the darkness comprehended it not."

Preceded by John 1:4	Gospel of John; Chapter 1	Succeeded by John 1:6
