= Altar cards =

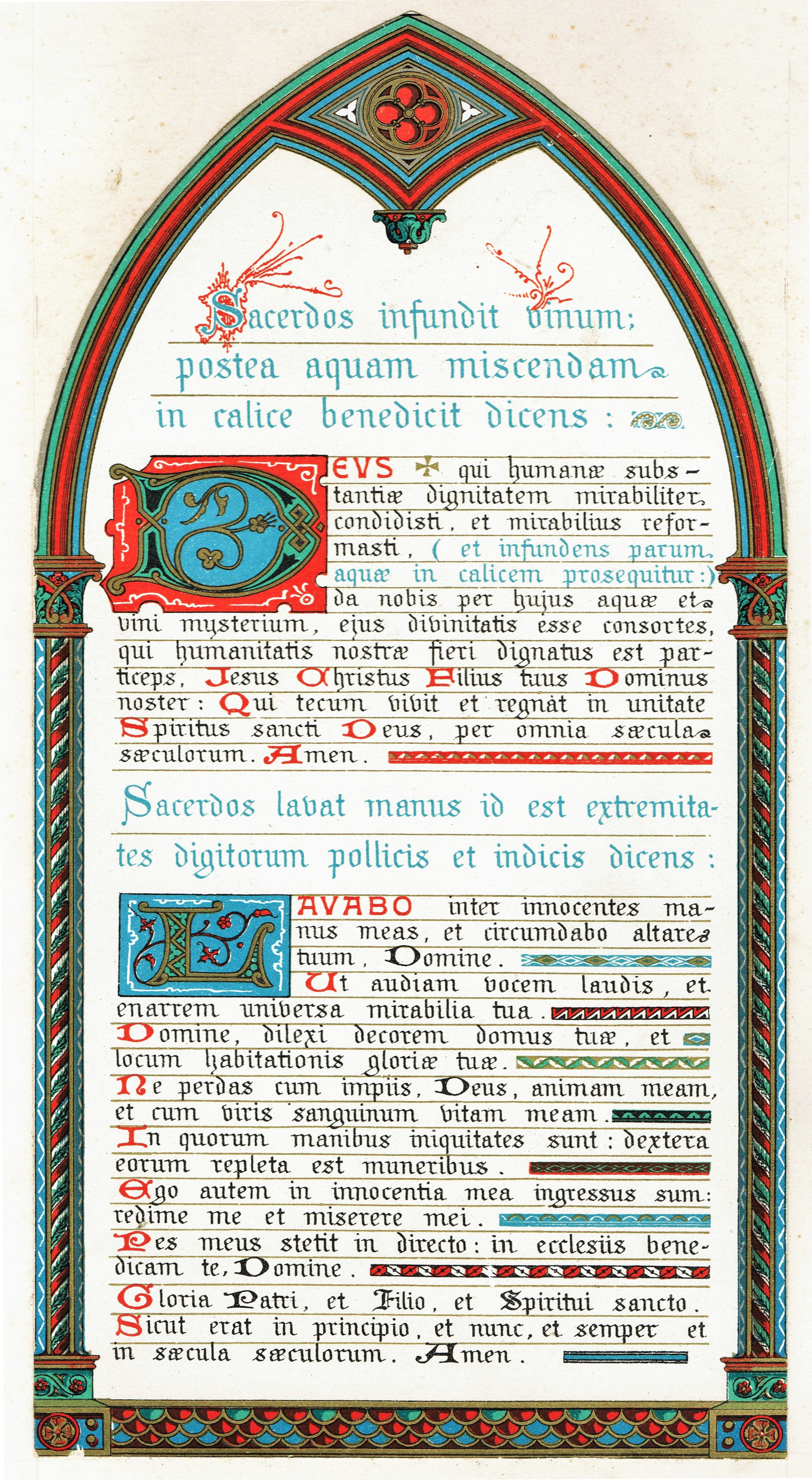
Altar Card (Lavabo part). Probably from the end of the 19th century. Gothic revival style.

Altar cards are three cards placed on the altar during the Tridentine Mass. They contain certain prayers that the priest must say during the Mass and serve as a memory aid. Visually, the cards can be elaborately decorated or simple and unembellished.

== History ==
Altar cards were not used before the sixteenth century, and even in missals since Trent they are not used when a bishop celebrates the Tridentine Mass, because he reads the entire Mass from the Pontifical Canon. When Pope Pius V restored the Missal, only the card at the middle of the altar was used, and it was called the Tabella Secretarum. The left card was added first, and then the right one was added for symmetry.

== Content of the cards ==
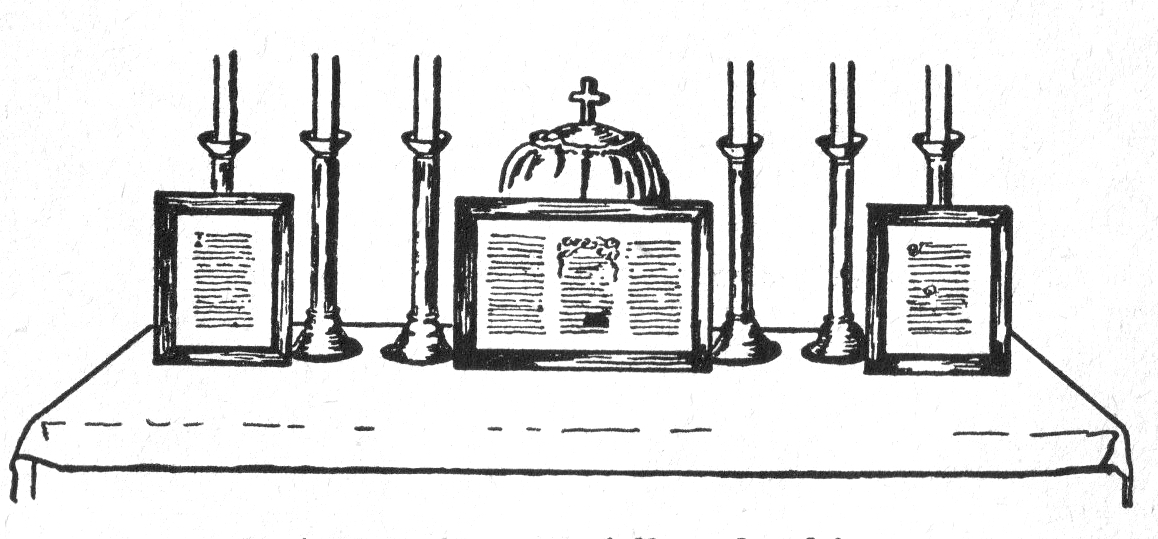
The three altar cards arranged on an altar for use.

The altar card on the left contains the Last Gospel (John 1:1–14), which is said at the very end of the Mass. The card on the right contains the prayer for blessing the wine and water ("Deus qui humanæ substantiæ") and the Lavabo ("I shall wash", from the words of Psalm 26[25 in the Septuagint/Vulgate]:6–12).

The larger, centre card contains the Gloria, the prayer Munda cor meum recited before reading the Gospel, the Credo, the prayer for offering the Host (Suscipe, Sancte Pater), the Words of Consecration, and portions of the Canon of the Mass. Usually, the card's centre contains a picture of the Crucifixion.

== Uses and regulations of altar cards ==
The altar cards may only stand on the altar during Mass. The center one stands against the Tabernacle, altar cross or other support, and the left and right ones stand against either the candlesticks or the superstructural steps (each called a "gradine") of the altar.

After Mass, they must either be removed or placed face downwards under the altar cover. The cards must be removed for the Exposition of the Blessed Sacrament.
