= Nathanael (follower of Jesus) =

Follower of Jesus

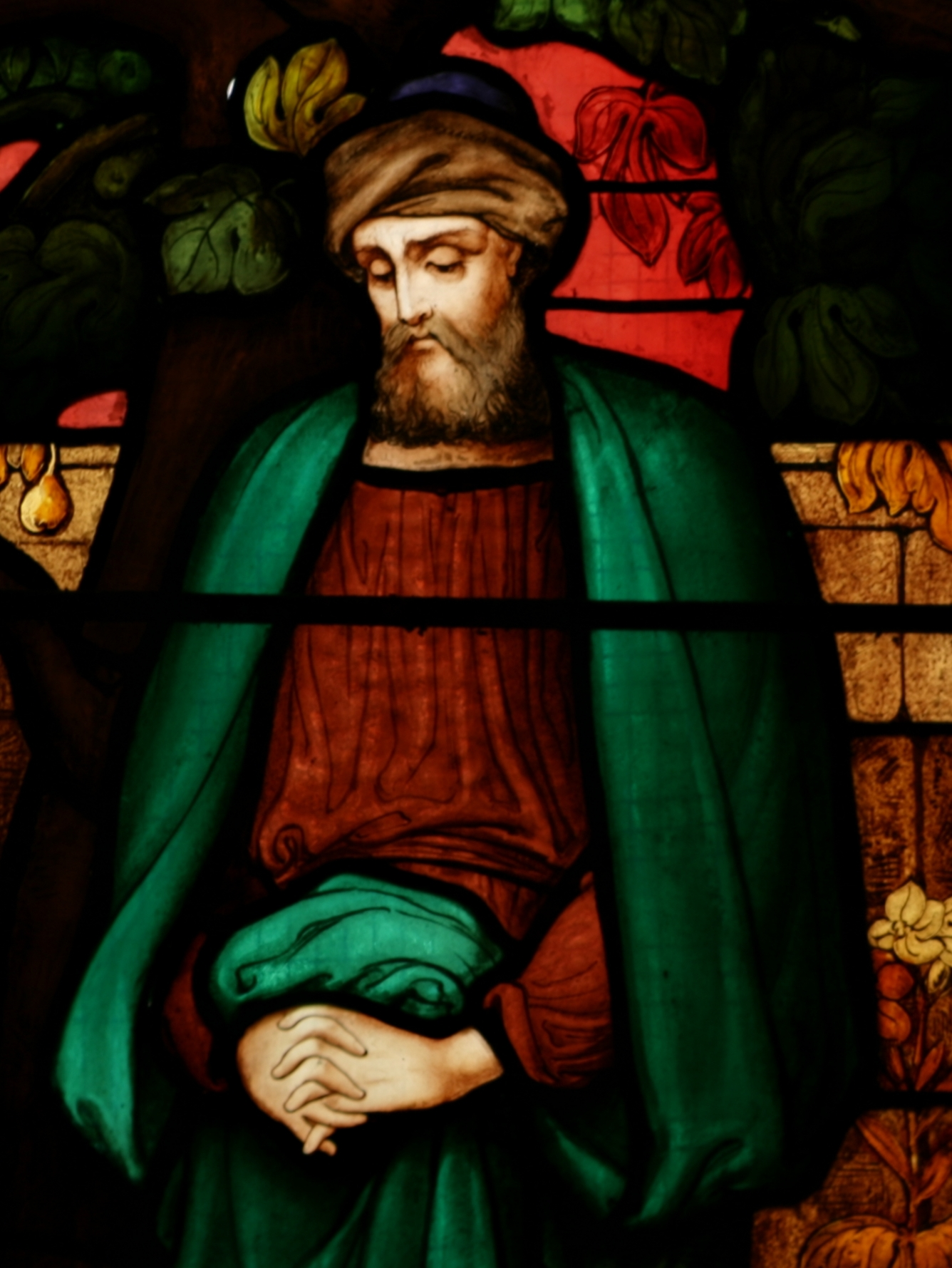
- Stained glass by Daniel Cottier and John Lamb Lyon at St John's, Ashfield

Religious life
- Religion: Christianity

Nathanael, (Note: Hebrew נתנאל, Greek: Ναθαναήλ, "God has given") also known as Nathaniel (Note: As John 21:2 in the International Standard Version. Also "Natan'el" in the Complete Jewish Bible.) of Cana, was a disciple of Jesus, mentioned only in chapters 1 and 21 of the Gospel of John.

== Gospel account ==
In the Gospel of John, Nathanael is introduced as a friend of Philip, from Bethsaida (1:43-44). The first disciples who follow Jesus are portrayed as reaching out immediately to family or friends: thus, Philip found Nathanael and said to him, "We have found Him of whom Moses in the law, and also the prophets, wrote — Jesus of Nazareth, the son of Joseph".

Nathanael is described as initially being skeptical about whether the Messiah could come from Nazareth, saying: "Can anything good come out of Nazareth?", but nonetheless, he accepts Philip's invitation to find out. Jesus immediately characterizes him as "an Israelite in whom is no deceit". Some scholars hold that when Jesus said, "Before Philip called you, when you were under the fig tree, I saw you", is based on a Jewish figure of speech, referring to studying the Torah. Nathanael recognizes Jesus as "the Son of God" and "the King of Israel".

He reappears (as "Nathanael of Cana") at the end of John's Gospel, as one of the disciples to whom Jesus appeared at the Sea of Galilee after the Resurrection.

== Identification as Bartholomew ==
Nathanael is usually identified with Bartholomew the Apostle mentioned in the Synoptic Gospels and Acts 1:13. The reason for this identification is Bartholomew being a surname (Nathanael Bar-Tolmai; meaning Nathanael, son of Tolmai), and because Bartholomew and Philip are always paired together in the synoptic gospels. The earliest known example of this identification is from Ishodad of Merv (c. 850). The earliest known reference in the West is in Rupert of Deutz (d. 1129).

However, some disagree with this identification. Augustine suspected that Nathanael was not one of the twelve at all because he was so versed in the law. The earliest identification of Nathanael with one of the Twelve Disciples is found in the 2nd-century Epistula Apostolorum, where he is identified with or takes the place of James, son of Alphaeus.
