= Last Gospel =

Section of the Christian Bible read in worship

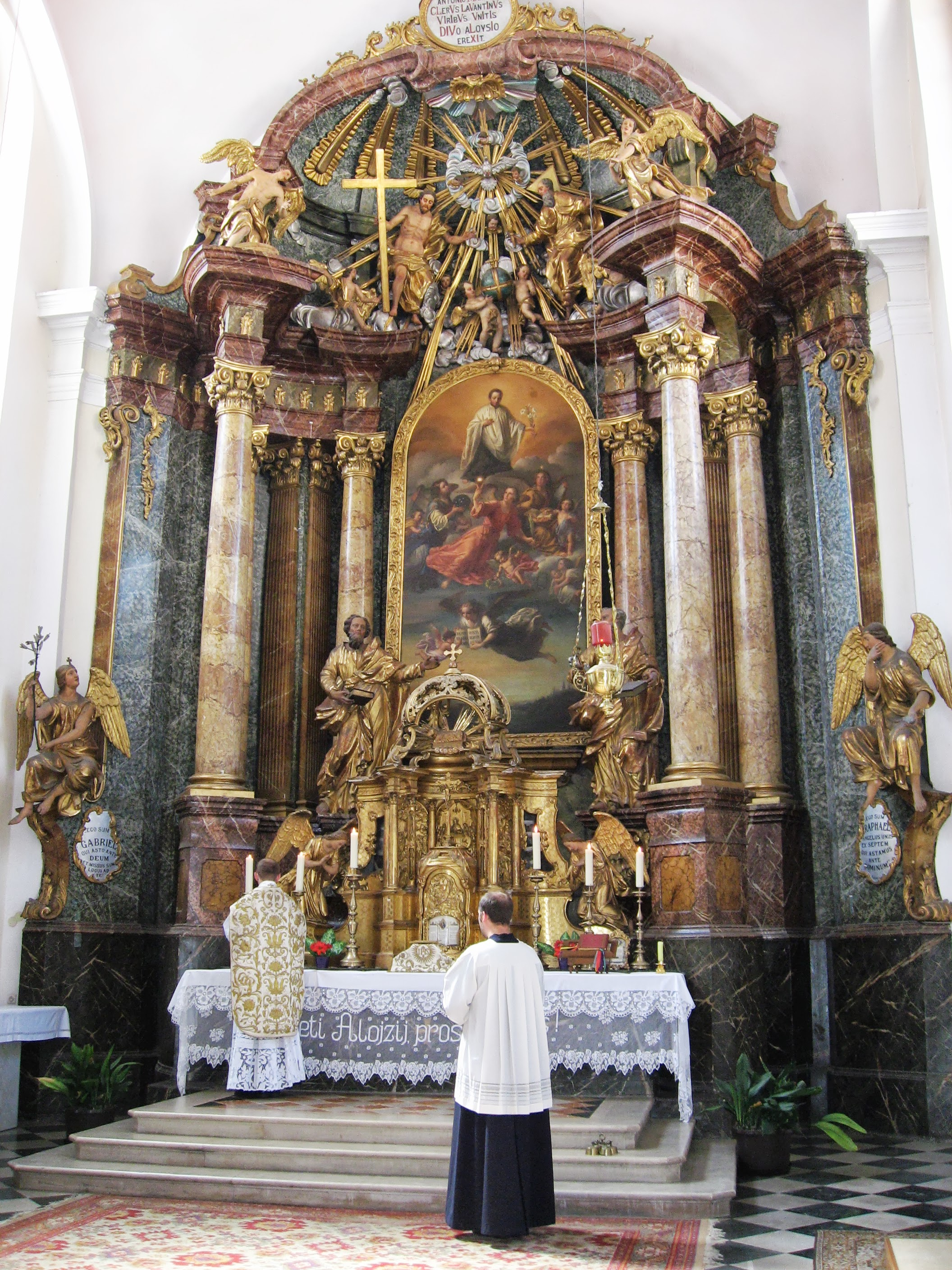
Last Gospel read at the conclusion of the Tridentine Mass.

"The Last Gospel" is the name given to the prologue of the Gospel of John (John 1:1–14) when read as part of the concluding rites in the Tridentine and Ordinariate forms of the Mass in the Catholic Church. The Prologue speaks on Jesus Christ as the Logos and on the Incarnation. The Last Gospel was omitted in the Mass of Paul VI.

== Description ==
The Last Gospel began as a private devotional practice on the priest's part, known well in the Sarum Rite in Catholic England, but was gradually absorbed into the rubrics of the Mass. Immediately after the final blessing, the priest goes to the Gospel side of the altar (i.e., to his left), and begins with the Dominus vobiscum as is usual at the Proclamation of the Gospel within the Mass. However, as the priest reads from an altar card and not a book, he traces a Sign of the Cross with his right thumb on the altar's surface instead of the Gospel text, then signing his own forehead, lips, and chest. At the words "Et Verbum caro factum est" ("And the Word became flesh"), the priest (and, if present, the servers and congregation) genuflects.

The text of the Gospel of John is perhaps best known for its opening, "In principio erat Verbum, et Verbum erat apud Deum, et Deus erat Verbum", which in most English translations has been rendered as "In the beginning was the Word, and the Word was with God, and the Word was God."

In principio erat Verbum, et Verbum erat apud Deum, et Deus erat Verbum.
Hoc erat in principio apud Deum.
Omnia per ipsum facta sunt: et sine ipso factum est nihil quod factum est:
in ipso vita erat, et vita erat lux hominum:
et lux in tenebris lucet, et tenebrae eam non comprehenderunt.
Fuit homo missus a Deo, cui nomen erat Ioannes.
Hic venit in testimonium, ut testimonium perhiberet de lumine,
ut omnes crederent per illum.
Non erat ille lux, sed ut testimonium perhiberet de lumine.
Erat lux vera quae illuminat omnem hominem venientem in hunc mundum.
In mundo erat, et mundus per ipsum factus est
et mundus eum non cognovit.
In propria venit, et sui eum non receperunt.
Quotquot autem receperunt eum, dedit eis potestatem filios Dei fieri,
his, qui credunt in nomine eius:
qui non ex sanguinibus, neque ex voluntate carnis, neque ex voluntate viri,
sed ex Deo nati sunt.
ET VERBUM CARO FACTUM EST,
et habitavit in nobis:
et vidimus gloriam eius, gloriam quasi Unigeniti a Patre,
plenum gratiae et veritatis.

Translation:

In the beginning was the Word, and the Word was with God, and the Word was God.
The same was in the beginning with God.
All things were made by Him, and without Him was made nothing that was made:
in Him was life, and the life was the Light of men;
and the Light shineth in darkness, and the darkness did not comprehend it.
There was a man sent from God, whose name was John.
This man came for a witness, to give testimony of the Light,
that all men might believe through him.
He was not the Light, but was to give testimony of the Light.
That was the true Light, which enlighteneth every man that cometh into this world.
He was in the world, and the world was made by Him,
and the world knew Him not.
He came unto His own, and His own received Him not.
But as many as received Him, He gave them power to be made the sons of God,
to them that believe in His Name,
who are born not of blood, nor of the will of the flesh, nor of the will of man,
but of God.
AND THE WORD WAS MADE FLESH,
and dwelt among us:
and we saw His glory, the glory as it were of the Only begotten of the Father,
full of grace and truth.

The third Mass of Christmas Day, where this same text is the Gospel of the Mass, has no Last Gospel; prior to the reforms in 1954 by Pope Pius XII, the Gospel for the Feast of the Epiphany would be read here. A Mass on Palm Sunday which is not immediately preceded by the palm blessing will use Matthew 21:1-9, the Gospel that would have been read during the palm blessing, in place of the usual reading from the Gospel of John. A superseded Mass, (e.g. a Sunday superseded by a saint's feast), could also be commemorated by, among other things, having its Gospel as the Last Gospel.

The Armenian Rite, used by both the Armenian Apostolic Church and the Armenian Catholic Church, adopted the Last Gospel, a legacy of frequent interactions between Latin Rite Crusaders and the Armenian Kingdom of Cilicia.
