= John 1 =

- ← Luke 24 chapter 2 →
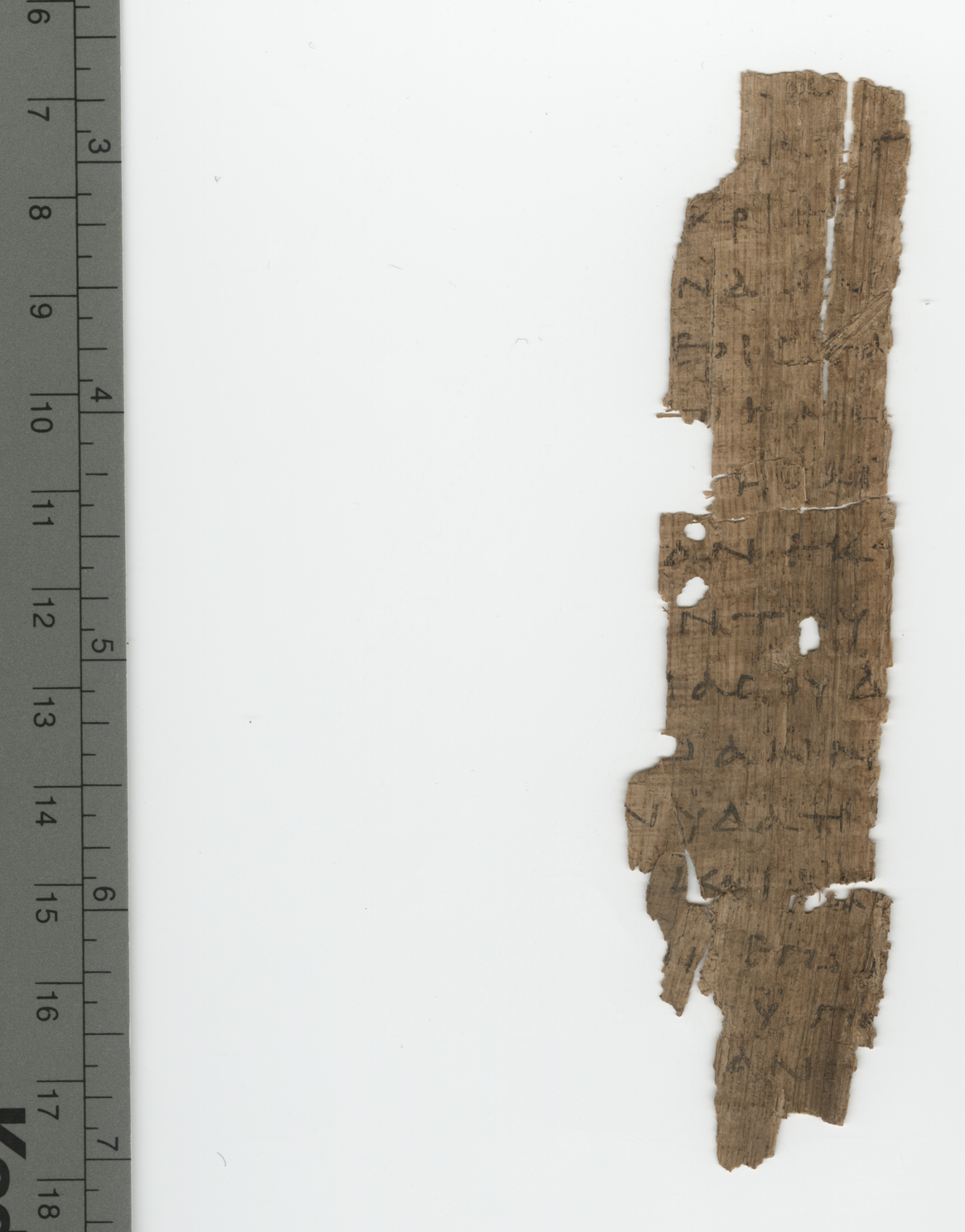
- John 1:21–28 on Papyrus 119, written about AD 250
- Book: Gospel of John
- Category: Gospel
- Christian Bible part: New Testament
- Order in the Christian part: 4

John 1 is the first chapter in the Gospel of John in the New Testament of the Holy Bible.

== Text ==
The original text was written in Koine Greek. This chapter is divided into 51 verses.

=== Textual witnesses ===
Some early manuscripts containing the text of this chapter are:

- Papyrus 75 (written c. 175 – c. 225 AD)
- Papyrus 66 (c. 200; complete)
- Papyrus 5 (c. 250; extant verses: 23–31, 33–40)
- Papyrus 119 (c. 250; extant verses 21–28, 38–44)
- Papyrus 106 (3rd century)
- Codex Vaticanus (c. 325 – c. 350)
- Codex Sinaiticus (c. 350; complete)
- Papyrus 120 (4th century; extant: verses 25–28, 38–44)
- Codex Bezae (c. 400; extant verses 1–15)
- Codex Washingtonianus (c. 400)
- Codex Alexandrinus (c. 400 – c. 440; almost complete)
- Codex Ephraemi Rescriptus (c. 450; extant verses 4–40)
- Codex Borgianus (5th century; extant verses 24–32 in Greek; 16–23 in Sahidic Coptic)
- Papyrus 55 (6th/7th century; extant verses 31–33, 35–38)
- Papyrus 59 (7th century; extant: verses 26, 28, 48, 51)
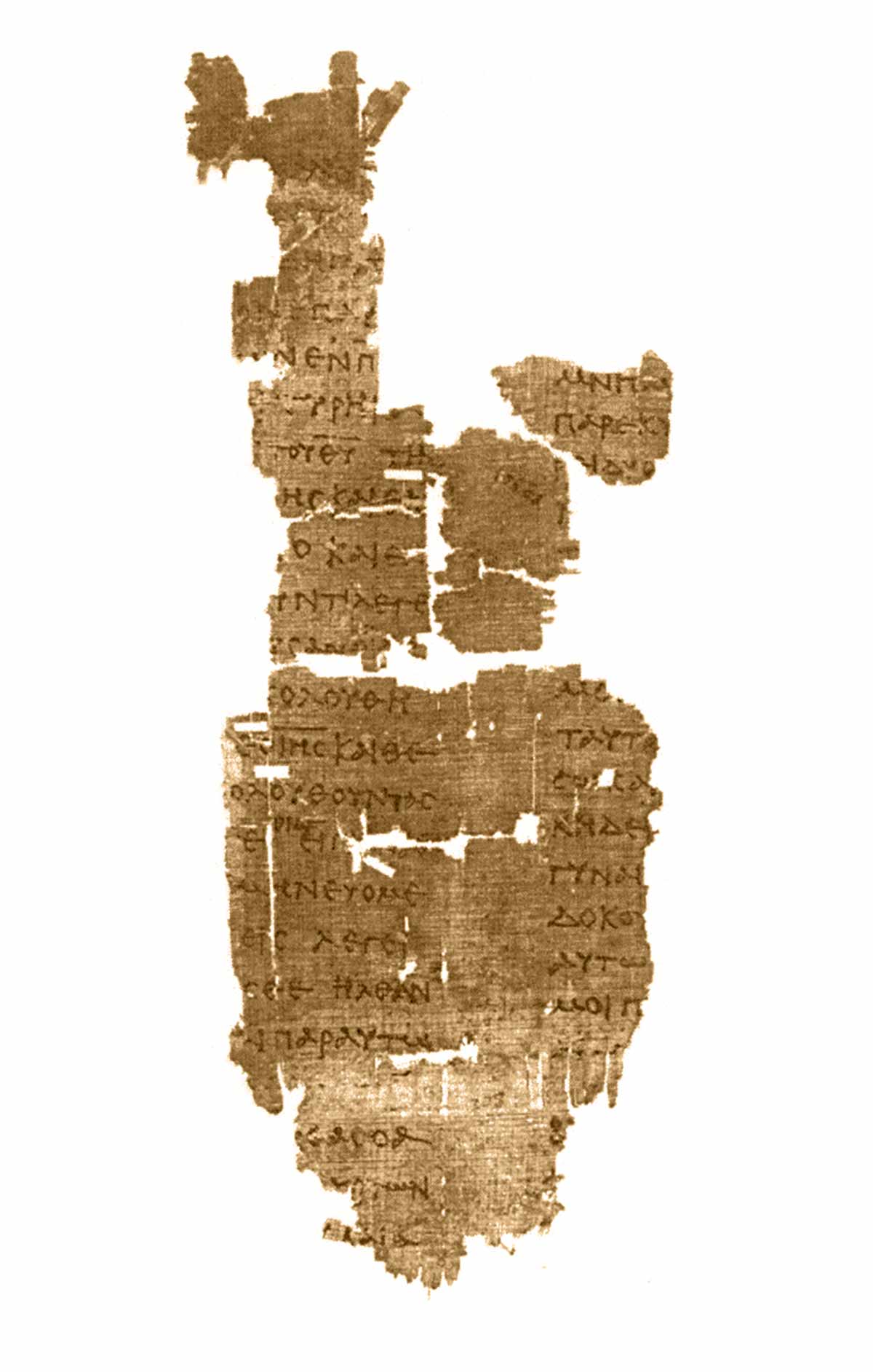
Papyrus 5, which has John 1:33–40

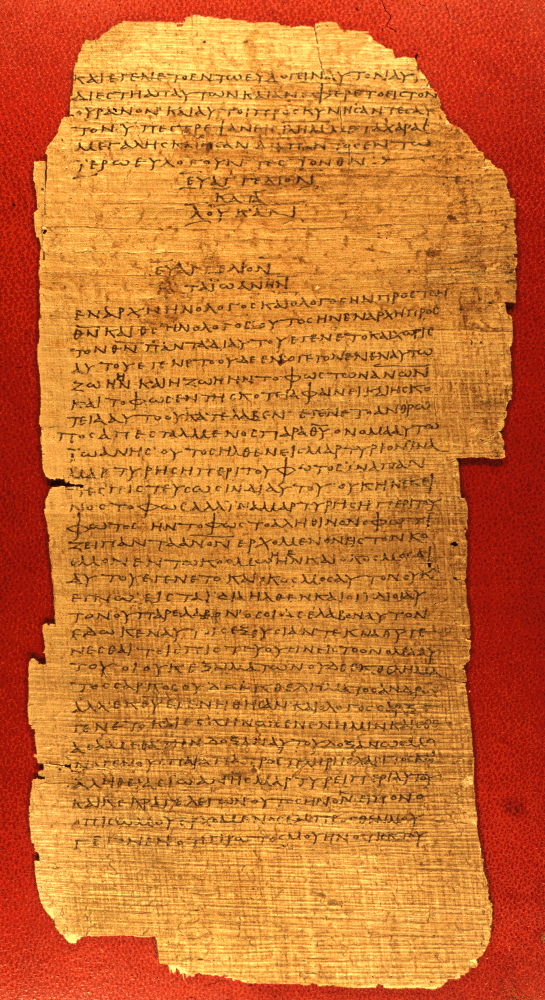
Papyrus 75, a page containing the end of the Gospel of Luke (Luke 24:51–53), followed by the beginning of the Gospel of John (John 1:1–16)

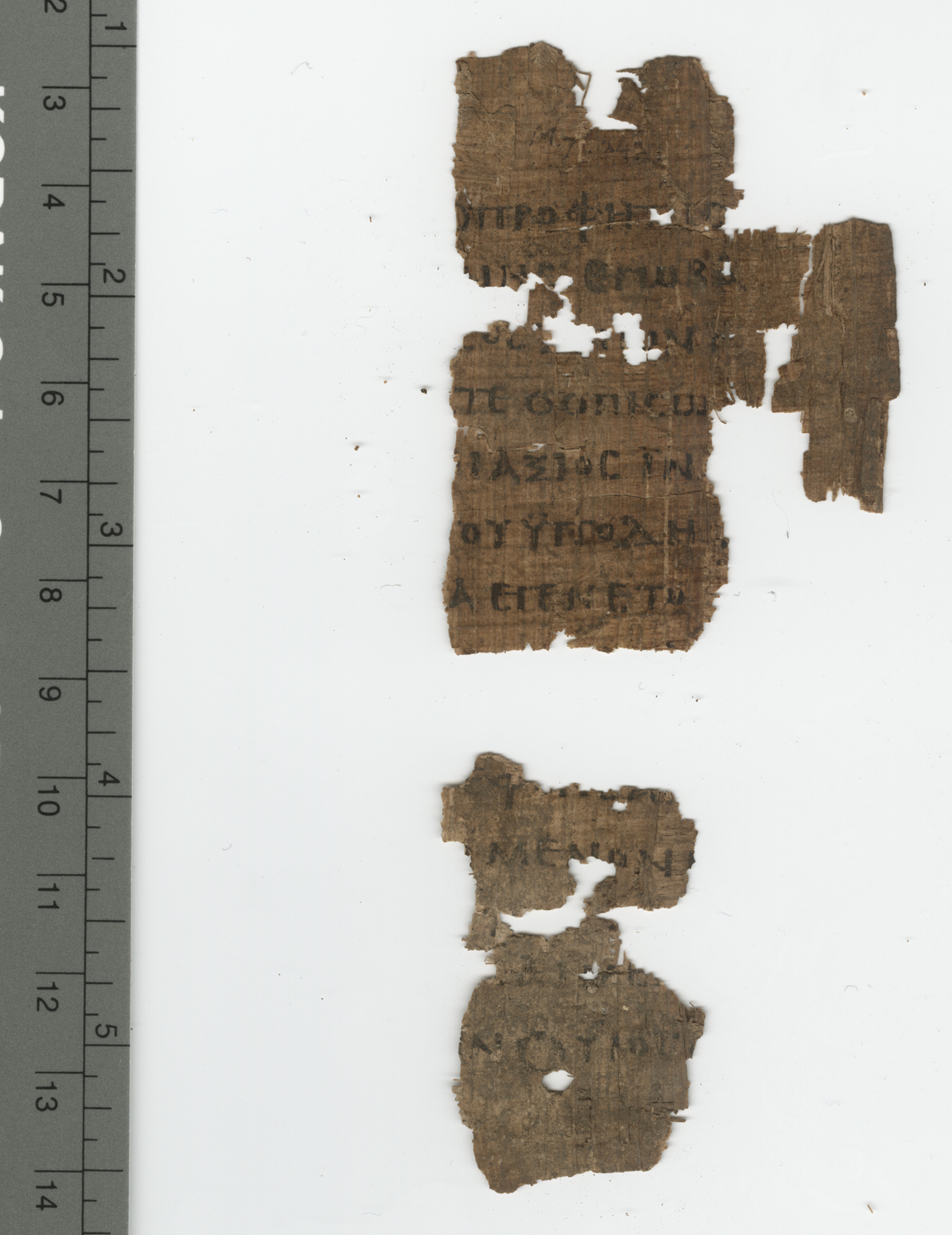
Papyrus 120, which has John 1:25–28

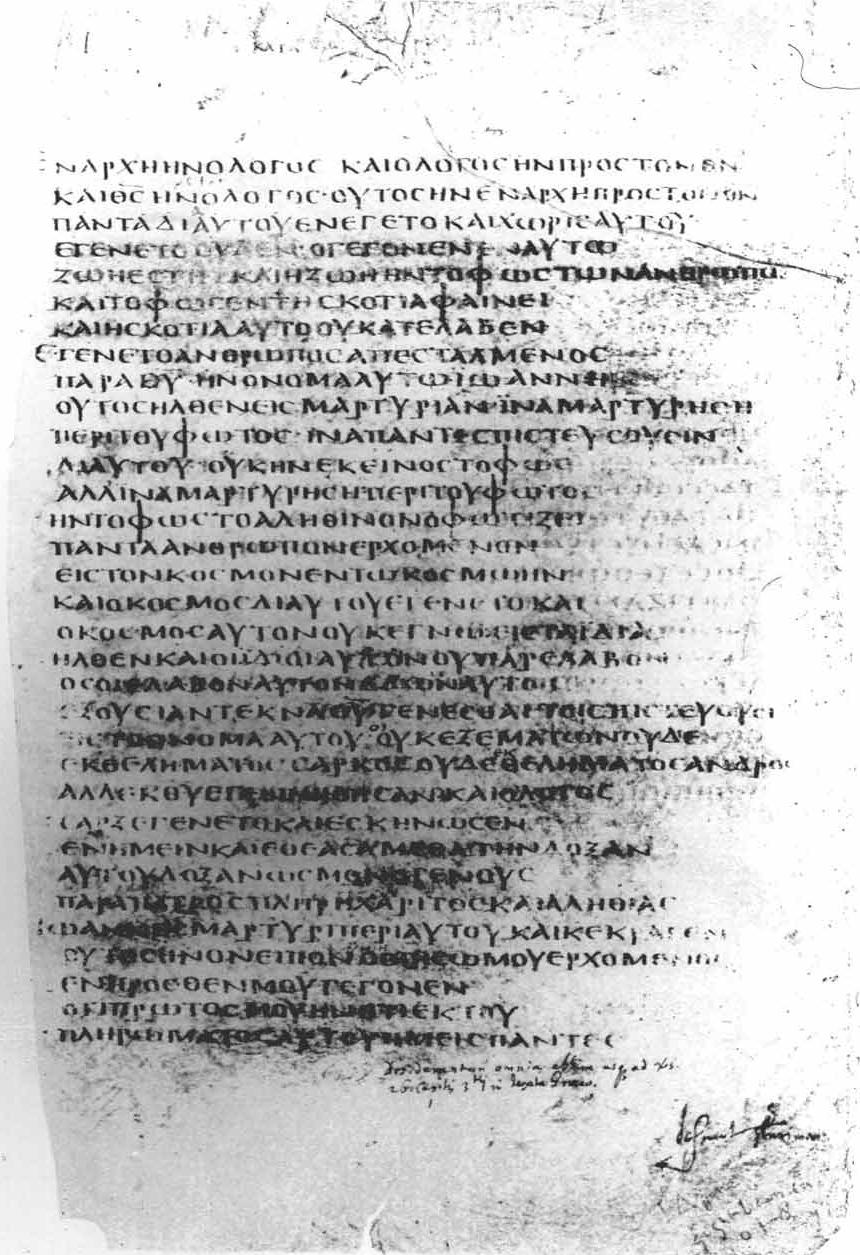
Codex Bezae, which has John 1:1–16

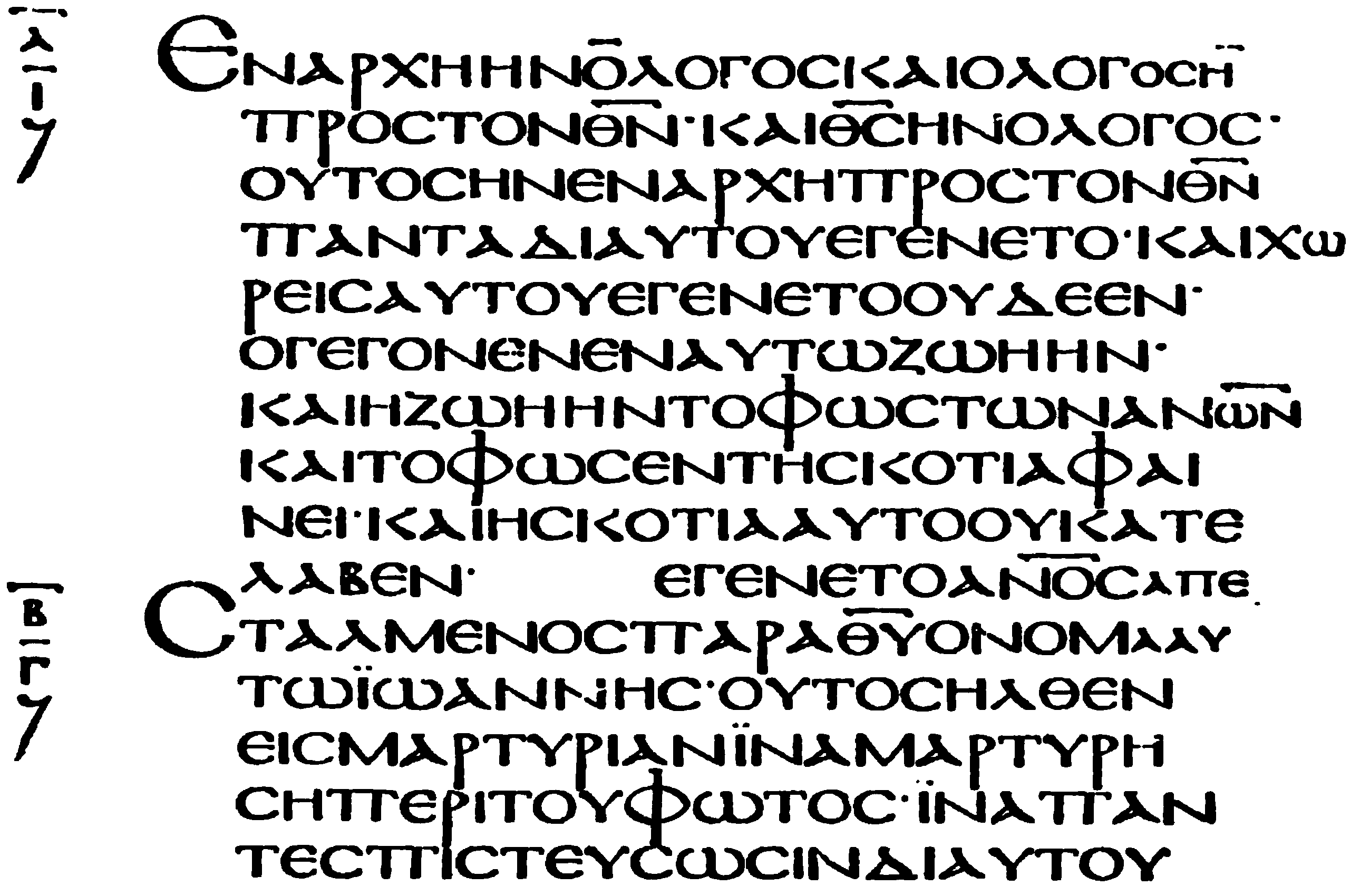
Codex Alexandrinus, John 1:1–7

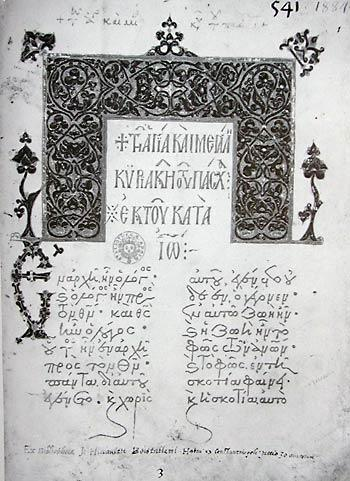
Lectionary 86, folio 1 recto (1336 AD), John 1:1–5

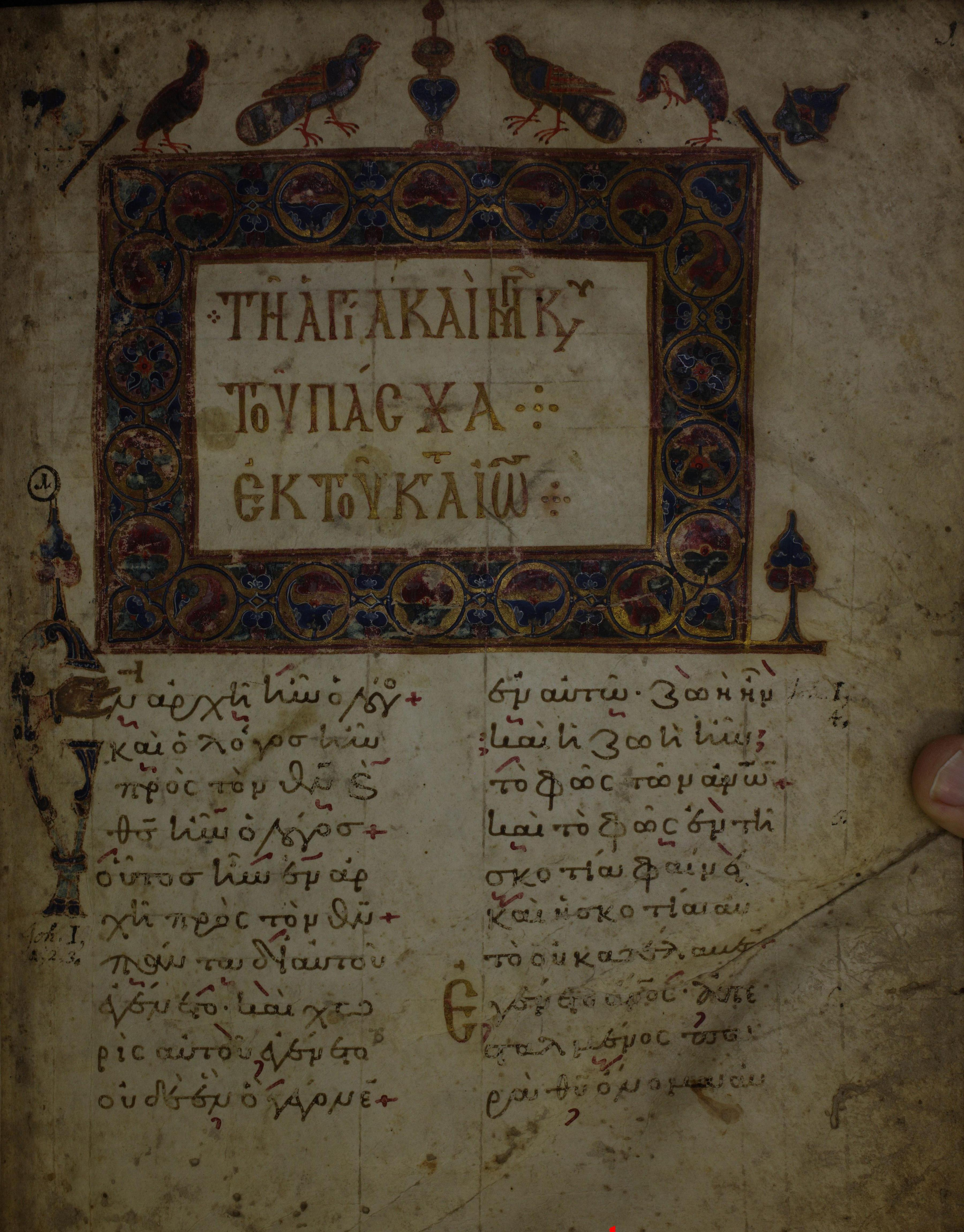
Lectionary 240 folio 1 recto, John 1:1–6 with decorated headpiece

=== Old Testament references ===
- John 1:2: Genesis 1:1
- John 1:45: Genesis 49:10; Leviticus 18:18; Isaiah 4:2

== Analysis ==
The first chapter of the Gospel of John has 51 verses and may be divided in three parts: (Note: The Jerusalem Bible (1966) uses this breakdown, although its primary analysis treats the Prologue as separate from John 1:18–3:21, which covers "The First Passover" with five distinct components.)

- The Prologue or Hymn to the Word (verses 1–18)
- The testimony of John the Baptist (verses 19–34)
- The first disciples (verses 35–51).

English language versions, which typically divide biblical chapters into sections, often have more divisions: for example, there are 5 sections in the New International Version and the Good News Translation, and 7 sections in the New King James Version.

=== Hymn to the Word (verses 1–18) ===
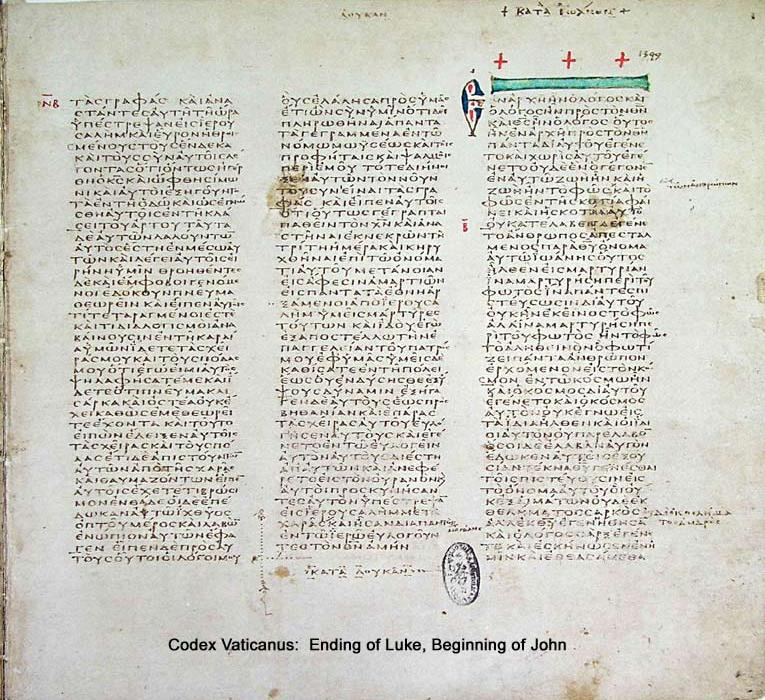
The end of Gospel of Luke and the beginning of Gospel of John on the same page in Codex Vaticanus (4th century)

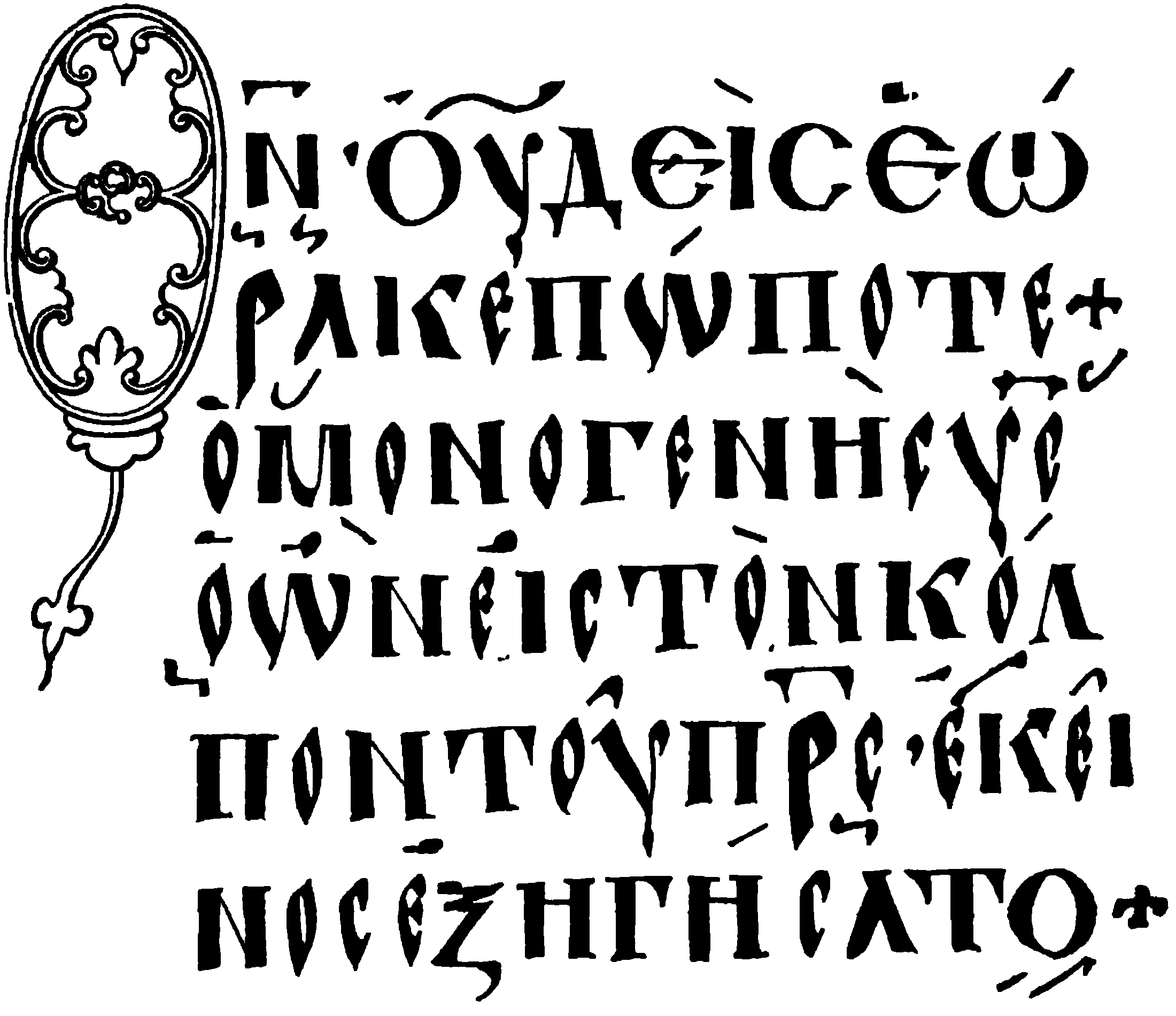
John 1:18–20 in Codex Harcleianus (Lectionary 150) from 995 AD

The first part (verses 1–18), often called the Hymn to the Word, is a prologue to the gospel as a whole, stating that the Logos is "God" ('divine', 'god-like', or 'a god' according to some translations).

Comparisons can be made between these verses and the narrative of Genesis 1, where the same phrase "In the beginning" first occurs along with the emphasis on the difference between the darkness (such as the "earth was formless and void", Genesis 1:2 in the King James Version) and the light.

Methodist founder John Wesley summarised the opening verses of John 1 as follows:

- John 1:1–2 describes the state of things before the creation
- John 1:3 describes the state of things in the creation
- John 1:4 describes the state of things in the time of man's innocence
- John 1:5 describes the state of things in the time of man's corruption.

According to the writers of the Pulpit Commentary, the phrase "the light of men" (John 1:4) "has been differently conceived by expositors. John Calvin supposed that the "understanding" was intended—"that the life of men was not of an ordinary description, but was united to the light of understanding," and is that by which man is differentiated from animals. Hengstenberg regards it, in consequence of numerous associations of "light" with "salvation" in Holy Scripture, as equivalent to salvation; Christoph Ernst Luthardt with "holiness" and many with the "eternal life", which would introduce great tautology."

The final verse of the prologue (verse 18) recalls verse 1, that no other possibility of human to know God except through Jesus Christ.

==== Verses 3–4 ====
^{3}All things were made through Him, and without Him nothing was made that was made. ^{4}In Him was life, and the life was the light of men.

— John 1:3–4, New King James Version

Some translations, including the New American Bible (Revised Edition) and the New Revised Standard Version, connect the final words of verse 3, εν ο γεγονεν, en ho gegonen with verse 4:

^{3}All things came into being through him, and without him not one thing came into being. What has come into being ^{4}in him was life, and the life was the light of all people.

— John 1:3–4, New Revised Standard Version

The New American Bible (Revised Edition) explains that "the oldest manuscripts have no punctuation here, the corrector of Bodmer Papyrus P75, some manuscripts, and the Ante-Nicene Fathers take this phrase with what follows [in verse 4], as staircase parallelism. Connection with John 1:3 reflects fourth-century anti-Arianism."

==== Verse 5 ====
And the light shineth in darkness; and the darkness comprehended it not.

— John 1:5, New King James Version

English translations of this verse often translate the Greek κατελαβεν as 'understanding' (such as in the New King James Version), but in other translations the meaning is given in terms of a struggle between darkness and light: "the light shines in the darkness, and the darkness has not overcome it" (Revised Standard Version).

==== Verse 6 ====
Verse 6 introduces "a man sent from God, whose name was John". Joseph Benson notes that the name "John" means 'grace': "a name fitly given to the Messiah's forerunner, who was sent to proclaim the immediate accomplishment of God's gracious intentions".

==== Verses 10–11 ====
Verses 10 and 11 state that "He was in the world, and the world was made through Him, and the world did not know Him. He came to His own, and His own did not receive Him". Theologians differ in their interpretation of these verses. Wesley viewed "in the world" as meaning "even from the creation", the Pulpit Commentary speaks of the "pre-Incarnation activity" of the Word and Joseph Benson wrote that "He was in the world [...] from the beginning, frequently appearing, and making known to his servants, the patriarchs and prophets, the divine will, in dreams and visions, and various other ways", whereas in Albert Barnes' opinion, "He was in the world [...] refers, probably, not to his pre-existence, but to the fact that he became incarnate; that he dwelt among human beings".

==== Verse 14 ====
And the Word was made flesh, and dwelt among us, (and we beheld his glory, the glory as of the only begotten of the Father,) full of grace and truth.

— John 1:14, KJV

The word flesh is emphasized as a 'symbol of humanity', drawing the attention to "the entry of the Word into the full flow of human affairs". The first-person ‘we’ refers to the individuals Jesus lived with, implying that the narrator witnessed Jesus in the flesh.

==== Verse 17 ====
For the law was given through Moses, but grace and truth came through Jesus Christ.

— John 1:17, NKJV

The incarnate Word's name is first mentioned in this verse; thereafter "John never uses the noun λόγος, the word, in this signification, throughout this whole book".

=== Testimony of John the Baptist (verses 19–34) ===
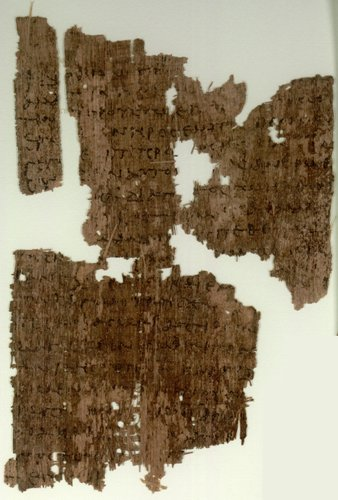
John 1:29–35 on Papyrus 106, written in the 3rd century

The second part of John 1 (verse 19 onwards) records the preparation that John the Baptist was making for the coming of the Messiah and the Messiah's first disciples. John has been introduced in verse 6, "a man sent from God", and his witness, known already by the reader, has already been recalled: "This is the One I told you about". The Greek text has the past tense (εἶπον) but both H. W. Watkins, in Charles Ellicott's Commentary, and Alfred Plummer, in the Cambridge Bible for Schools and Colleges, prefer a present tense translation such as "John bears witness".

Verses 19 to 27 present John's manifesto, delivered in Bethany, beyond the Jordan, to the priests and Levites sent by the Pharisees to investigate his message and purpose. In response to their enquiries, John confesses that he is not the Messiah, nor the reappearance of the prophet Elijah (contrast Matthew 11:14 RSV, NKJV, where Jesus states that John is "Elijah who is to come"), nor "the prophet", the one of whom Deuteronomy 18:15, 18 had spoken. In this passage the Messiah and the foretold "prophet" are not necessarily identified with each other; "on the contrary", notes Johann Bengel, "they looked on the prophet as a distinct person from the Christ" (cf. John 7:40–41: "Many from the crowd, when they heard this saying, said, "Truly this is the Prophet". Others said, "This is the Christ"").

The evangelist divides this series of events into four 'days': the day (or period) when the Jerusalem delegation met John to enquire into his identity and purpose (John 1:19–28) is followed by John seeing Jesus coming towards him "the next day" (John 1:29), and on "the next day again" he directs his own disciples towards following Jesus (John 1:35–37). A fourth 'day' follows (John 1:43) on which Jesus "wanted" or "decided" to go to Galilee. (Note: Both verbs are found, in various translations.) Bengel calls these "Great Days!", because "the care of this Evangelist in marking times is remarkable".

=== Jesus' first disciples (verses 35–51) ===
As the chapter progresses further, the gospel describes how Jesus calls his first disciples, Andrew and an unnamed disciple (verses 35–40). The unnamed disciple was possibly John, the evangelist. Andrew finds his brother Simon (verses 41–42), and Jesus changes Simon's name to Cephas (Peter) (verse 42). Cephas, original Greek: Κηφᾶς (Kēphâs), means "a rock" (Young's Literal Translation) or "a stone" (King James Version). This provided a powerful analogy as to the role Peter would have after the crucifixion; to lead the development of the church. Name changes occur in other places in the Bible and demonstrate God's authority as well as what that person would become, do, or had done, such as Abram to Abraham, Jacob to Israel and Saul to Paul.

On the day when Jesus decided to go to Galilee, he invited Philip, from Bethsaida, to follow him (John 1:43-44).

Jesus' first active sign of insight comes in verse 47, in his recognition of Nathaniel: "Behold, an Israelite indeed, in whom is no guile", "an affirmation showing intimate knowledge", leaving Nathaniel thoroughly impressed by Jesus' foreknowledge of his personal character. (Note: Cf. Jesus' knowledge of the Samaritan woman at the well in John 4:18, 30.)

== The titles of Jesus ==
Within these verses Jesus is given the following titles:

- the true light (John 1:9)
- the Word and the Word made flesh (John 1:1, 14), identified by the Christian theology with the second divine person of the Most Holy Trinity
- the Son of God (John 1:34,49) and the Unigenitus Son of God (John 1:14) and the Nicene Creed)
- the Lamb of God (John 1:29,36)
- Rabbi, meaning Teacher or Master (John 1:38,49)
- the Messiah, or the Christ (John 1:41)
- Jesus of Nazareth, son of Joseph (John 1:45)
- the King of Israel (John 1:49)
- the "Son of Man" or "Son of Humanity" (John 1:51)
- the one who will baptize with the Holy Spirit (John 1:33)
- the one of whom Moses wrote in the law (John 1:45, referring to Deuteronomy 18:15: "The Lord your God will raise up for you a Prophet like me from your midst, from your brethren: him you shall hear")

== The disciple whom Jesus loved ==
The first appearance of the "disciple whom Jesus loved" in this Gospel is as one of the two disciples of John the Baptist who become the first followers of Jesus, but this is indicated in a subtle way. Bauckham notes the occurrence of at least two specific words in the narratives of both the first and the last appearance of this disciple: "to follow" (Greek: ἀκολουθέω 'akoloutheó') and "to remain/stay" (Greek: μένω, 'menó'). In verse 1:38 it is stated that "Jesus turned, and seeing them following ('akolouthountas'), said to them, "What do you seek?"", then in verse 1:39 they "remained ('emeinan') with Him that day". In the last chapter of the Gospel, the last appearance of the 'Disciple whom Jesus loved' is indicated using similar words: in verse 21:20 it is written that "Peter, turning around, saw the disciple whom Jesus loved following ('akolouthounta')", then in verse 21:22 "Jesus said to him [Peter], "If I will that he remain ('menein') till I come, what is that to you?" Bauckham sees the placement of the appearances of the disciple as "the inclusio of eyewitness testimony" to privilege his witness (in the Gospel of John 21:24) over Peter's, not to denigrate Peter's authority, but rather to claim a distinct qualification as an 'ideal witness' to Christ, because he survives Peter and bears his witness after Peter. The inclusio also reinforces the Beloved Disciple's unique status among the disciples: He has followed and remained with Jesus from beginning to end. The appearances are also close to Peter's, as the first one, along with Andrew, happened just before Peter's, who was then given the name 'Cephas' (alluding Peter's role after Jesus' departure), and the last one, just after Jesus' dialogue with Peter, acknowledging the significance of Peter's testimony within "the Petrine's inclusio", which is also found in the Gospel of Mark and Luke (see Luke 8 under "The Women who sustained Jesus").

== Chronology ==
Verses 1:19 to 2:1 contain a chronological record of an eyewitness:

- Day 1: the Jews sent priests and Levites from Jerusalem to ask John the Baptist (John 1:19–1:28).
- Day 2 ("the next day"): John saw Jesus coming toward him, and said, "Behold! The Lamb of God who takes away the sin of the world!..." (John 1:29–1:34).
- Day 3 ("again, the next day"): John stood with two of his disciples, and looking at Jesus as He walked, he said, "Behold the Lamb of God!": The two disciples heard him speak, and they followed Jesus. One of them is mentioned by name as "Andrew, Simon Peter's brother"; the other one not named is the eyewitness, who is John the Evangelist (John 1:35–1:40).
- Day 4 (one day after Andrew and John stayed with Jesus for the rest of Day 3): Andrew brought Simon Peter to Jesus (John 1:41–1:42).
- Day 5 ("the following day"; Day 1 of travel to Cana): Philip and Nathanael followed Jesus (John 1:43–1:51).
- Day 6 (Day 2 on the way to Cana): Travel to Galilee (John 1:43).
- Day 7 ("on the third day"): The wedding in Cana of Galilee (John 2:1).

== Uses ==
=== Liturgical ===
In the Latin Rite of the Catholic Church and in Western Rite Orthodoxy, the chapter's first fourteen verses are known as the "Last Gospel", as they are recited at the end of the Tridentine Mass (or "Extraordinary Form") of the Mass. This is distinct from the Proclamation of the Gospel that occurs much earlier in the service.

After reciting the dismissal formula Ite Missa est, the priest reads the Last Gospel in Latin from the altar card to their left. Instead of touching the text with his thumb and then making the small Sign of the Cross as at the Gospel reading, he instead touches the altar. At the beginning of verse 14, Et Verbum caro factum est ("And the Word became flesh"), the priest and attending servers genuflect. Any congregants present, who remain standing for the reading, would kneel at this point, responding with Deo gratias ("Thanks be to God") at its conclusion.

This ritual began as a private devotion for the priest after Mass. It is not part of the 1969 Mass of Paul VI (known as the "Ordinary Form" and widely used today) that was introduced after the Second Vatican Council.

The Prologue to St. John's Gospel, 1:1–18, is read on Christmas Day at the principal Mass during the day in the Roman Catholic Church, a tradition that dates back at least to the 1570 Roman Missal.

In the Church of England, following the Book of Common Prayer (1662), St. John 1:1–14 is appointed to be read on Christmas Day. This tradition has been maintained in the Episcopal Church (United States) in its Book of Common Prayer beginning in 1789. In the Book of Common Prayer (1928) and Book of Common Prayer (1979), St. John 1:1–14 is appointed as the Gospel lesson for the principal celebration on Christmas Day.

The Revised Common Lectionary provides three sets of Propers for Christmas, with John 1:1–14 assigned in Proper III, intended for use at the principal celebration on Christmas Day.

The first fourteen verses of this chapter form the ninth and final reading of the Festival of Nine Lessons and Carols. On Christmas Eve in King's College Chapel, Cambridge, this is read by the Provost.

=== Music ===
The King James Version of verse 29 from this chapter is cited as texts in the English-language oratorio "Messiah" by George Frideric Handel (HWV 56).

=== Freemasonry ===
In the 17th and 18th centuries, new Masons took their obligations on the Bible, specifically opened to the Gospel of St. John.

== Sources ==
- Bauckham, Richard (2017). Jesus and the Eyewitnesses (2nd ed.). Wm. B. Eerdmans Publishing. ISBN 9780802874313.
- Guthrie, Donald (1994). "John". In Carson, D. A.; France, R. T.; Motyer, J. A.; Wenham, G. J. (eds.). New Bible Commentary: 21st Century Edition (4, illustrated, reprint, revised ed.). Inter-Varsity Press. pp. 1021–1065. ISBN 9780851106489.

Preceded by Luke 24	Chapters of the Bible; Gospel of John	Succeeded by John 2
