= John 6 =

- ← chapter 5 chapter 7 →
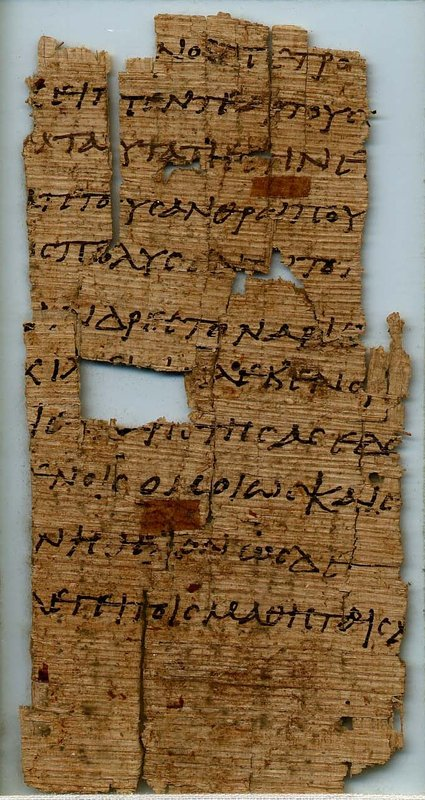
- John 6:8–12 on the recto side of Papyrus 28, written c. AD 250
- Book: Gospel of John
- Category: Gospel
- Christian Bible part: New Testament
- Order in the Christian part: 4

John 6 is the sixth chapter of the Gospel of John in the New Testament of the Christian Bible. It records Jesus' miracles of feeding the five thousand and walking on water, the Bread of Life Discourse, popular rejection of his teaching, and Peter's confession of faith. The final verses anticipate Jesus' betrayal by Judas Iscariot.

The gospel identifies an unnamed "disciple whom Jesus loved" as its source and possible author. Early Christian tradition uniformly affirmed that John composed this Gospel.

== Text ==
The original text was written in Koine Greek. This chapter is divided into 71 verses. Some early manuscripts containing the text of this chapter are:

- Papyrus 75 (AD 175–225)
- Papyrus 66 (c. 200)
- Papyrus 28 (c. 250)
- Codex Vaticanus (325–350)
- Codex Sinaiticus (330–360)
- Codex Bezae (c. 400)
- Codex Alexandrinus (400–440; extant verses 1–49)
- Codex Ephraemi Rescriptus (c. 450; extant: verses 39–71)

Some writers place this chapter ahead of John 5. Swedish-based commentator René Kieffer considers the case for this reordering unproven, but he does recognise that chapter 6 may have been inserted into a putative second edition of the gospel. H. W. Watkins, in Charles Ellicott's Commentary for English Readers (1905), considered whether "a portion of the Gospel between John 5 and 6 has been lost", but treats this as a "purely arbitrary supposition".

=== Old Testament references ===
- John 6:4: Leviticus 23:5; Deuteronomy 16:1
- John 6:31: Exodus 16:4; Nehemiah 9:15; Psalm 78:24; Numbers 11:7
- John 6:45: Isaiah 54:13; Jeremiah 31:34

=== New Testament references ===
- John 6:42: John 1:11 – "He came to His own, and His own did not receive Him."

== Places ==
Events recorded in this chapter refer to the following locations in Galilee:

- on a mountain in a deserted place, probably to the eastern side of the Sea of Galilee (or "Sea of Tiberias") (John 6:3 and 6:15)
- on the Sea of Galilee itself (John 6:16–21a)
- in Capernaum (John 6:21b, 6:24 and 6:59).

Boats which had come from Tiberias and sail onwards to Capernaum are also mentioned (John 6:23–24).

== Structure ==
Kieffer describes this chapter as "a well-defined unit". The New King James Version organises it as follows:

- John 6:1–14: Feeding the five thousand
- John 6:15–21: Jesus walks on the sea
- John 6:22–40: The Bread from Heaven
- John 6:41–59: Rejected by his own
- John 6:60–71: Many disciples turn away

Alfred Plummer, in the Cambridge Bible for Schools and Colleges, prefers not to break up the text from John 6:26 to 6:58, arguing that this text "forms one connected discourse spoken at one time in the synagogue at Capernaum".

== Introduction ==
The events recorded in chapter 5 are set in Jerusalem. As chapter 6 opens, the setting has moved to the Sea of Galilee, 100 miles (160 km) further north.

"After these things Jesus went over (or away to) the Sea of Galilee, which is the Sea of Tiberias" (New King James Version and English Standard Version texts). The Greek text reads μετα ταυτα (meta tauta, "after these things"). The New International Version translates these words as "some time after this" to remove any suggestion that the transition is immediate.

Plummer observes that "the scene shifts suddenly from Judaea to Galilee; but we are told nothing about the transit. We see more and more as we go on, that this Gospel makes no attempt to be a complete or connected whole. There are large gaps in the chronology."

Jesus travels over, or beyond (Greek: πέραν), the lake: presumably from west to east. This is Albert Barnes' view, and that of Plummer. A large crowd has followed Jesus, attracted by his healings, which the Gospel describes as "signs" (Greek: σημεια) - a distinctive word and theme in John's Gospel. Jesus ascends the mountain and sits with his disciples - a similar setting to the opening of the Sermon on the Mount in Matthew's Gospel (Matthew 5:1), in contrast to the Gospel of Luke, where the comparable event is known as the Sermon on the Plain (Luke 6:17–49).

=== Verse 2 ===
And a large crowd was following him, because they saw the signs that he was doing on the sick.

This is the first reference in John's Gospel to the crowds who follow Jesus. In the synoptic gospels, reference is made to "the crowds" from relatively early within each evangelist's account of Jesus' ministry (Matthew 4:25, Mark 2:2ff, and Luke 4:42).

=== Verse 3 ===
And Jesus went up on the mountain, and there He sat with His disciples.

Watkins suggests that "the mountain" refers to "the hill-country" to the east of the lake, rather than to a specific mountain. The Complete Jewish Bible in like manner states that Jesus "went up into the hills".

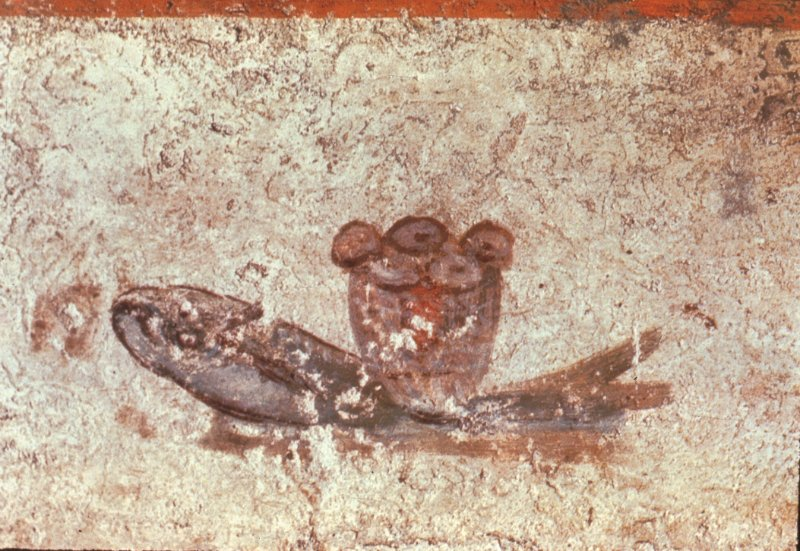
Early third century depiction of Eucharistic bread and fish, Catacomb of San Callisto, Rome.

=== Verse 4 ===
Now the Passover, a feast of the Jews, was near.

The wording is similar to John 2:13, when "the Passover of the Jews was at hand, and Jesus went up to Jerusalem"; here the words are not a mere chronological note, but, according to Watkins, a key to the interpretation of the passage. John Chrysostom asked his hearers to consider what had unfolded between the Passover of John 2 and this one, presumably one year later: only two "miracles" or "principal acts" have been recorded as taking place over this time. For Kieffer, "the approach of Passover in chapter 6 anticipates the last Passover" in chapters 13-17.

== Feeding the five thousand ==
Jesus sees the multitude coming towards him, and wants to feed them and to test his disciples, in this case Philip and Andrew. Unlike the other evangelists, John does not present the feeding of the multitude in an 'evening' setting: in Matthew 14:15, "it was evening ... already late"; in Mark 6:35, "the day was now far spent", and in Luke 9:12 "the day had begun to wear away". John advises his readers that "the Passover, a feast of the Jews, is approaching", but he does not refer to a journey to Jerusalem for the feast (compare John 2:13). According to the narrative of chapters 6 and 7, Jesus and his disciples did not visit Jerusalem for the Passover that year at all: they remain in Galilee until John 7:1–6 relates a discussion as to whether they should go to Jerusalem for the subsequent Feast of Tabernacles.

In verse 5, Jesus asks Philip where they could buy sufficient bread for the crowd, assuming that the crowd (apart from one boy) had not brought their own provisions. Methodist minister Joseph Benson suggested that Jesus "addressed himself to Philip particularly, because he, being a native of Bethsaida, was best acquainted with that country", although according to John 1:44, Peter and Andrew were also from Bethsaida. Philip may have been the group member who looked after their money and "the care of the supply of provisions", as he was aware that they held 200 denarii between them (John 6:7), although John 13:29 attributes this responsibility to Judas Iscariot. The evangelist notes in verse 6 that the question was put to Philip "to test him": theologian Heinrich August Wilhelm Meyer thinks this was not a test of faith: rather, "we might say" that "it was because Philip had to be tested according to his intellectual idiosyncrasy", noting Philip's train of thought in John 14:8ff, "Lord, show us the Father, and it is sufficient for us." Conversely, some writers, including Ernst Wilhelm Hengstenberg and Albert Barnes, hold that the wording does indicate a trial of Philip's faith, while Eugene H. Peterson suggests that Jesus' intention is "to stretch Philip's faith".

Philip "swiftly calculates" that "two hundred denarii worth of bread is not sufficient for [the crowd], that every one of them may have a little". According to Matthew 20:2, the labourers in the parable of the labourers in the vineyard were paid one denarius per day, so 200 denarii would equate to 200 days' labour, hence the New International Version translates Philip's reply as "It would take more than half a year's wages to buy enough bread for each one to have a bite" and in the New Living Translation his words are "Even if we worked for months, we wouldn't have enough money to feed them!" In the King James Version, 200 denarii was rendered as "200 pennyworth".

Andrew, one of Jesus' disciples, Simon Peter's brother, said to Jesus: "There is a lad here who has five barley loaves and two small fish, but what are they among so many?". It is curious that Andrew is "introduced" here to the reader, "in apparent forgetfulness" that an introduction has already been given in John 1:40, where he was the first of John the Baptist's disciples to follow Jesus and where he himself went to find Peter. Some texts state that there was "one boy" (Greek: παιδάριον ἓν), but the Greek: ἓν ('one') "is rejected by modern editors". Watkins notes that where it appears in some manuscripts, it conveys a sense of "One lad! What could he bear for so many?" The word Greek: παιδάριον occurs only here in the New Testament, and in Matthew's account the disciples themselves "have only five loaves and two fish", prompting theologian John Gill to suggest that the boy may have "belonged to Christ and his disciples, and was employed to carry their provisions for them".

No-one suggests going to the nearby lake to catch extra fish, but Jesus' actions show that the small supply of bread and fish is sufficient: he instructs his disciples to "make the people sit down" and "having given thanks" (Greek: ευχαριστησας, 'eucharistēsas', from which the word Eucharist is derived) for the bread and likewise for the fish, he gave them to his disciples to distribute among the crowd. Plummer suggests that giving thanks for the food was not only the customary thanksgiving for food but also "the means of the miracle" taking place, because (1) all four [gospel] narratives notice it; (2) it is pointedly mentioned again in John 6:23:

They had eaten bread after the Lord had given thanks.

After the meal, the fragments of the barley loaves which were left over were collected by the disciples and found to have filled twelve baskets. According to the Pulpit Commentary, "the number 'twelve' naturally suggests that each one of the twelve apostles had been employed in the collection of the fragments", although at this stage in the Gospel, "the twelve" have not yet been mentioned. (Note: The first reference to "the twelve" in John's Gospel comes later in this chapter, at John 6:67) Lutheran theologian Christoph Luthardt linked the twelve baskets to the twelve tribes of Israel.

== Prophet and King ==
^{14} Then those men, when they had seen the sign that Jesus did, said, "This is truly the Prophet who is to come into the world." ^{15} Therefore when Jesus perceived that they were about to come and take Him by force to make Him king, He departed again to the mountain by Himself alone.

The crowd recognise Jesus as "the prophet who is to come" (verse 14), foretold by Moses, whose witness Jesus had affirmed in the previous chapter of the gospel (John 5:45, compare Deuteronomy 18:18). Keiffer sees the whole of chapter 6 as "a concrete example of how Moses wrote about Jesus". However, the crowd interpret this politically and come to make Jesus king "by force". This is not Jesus' intention, so he leaves "again" (verse 15) to spend time alone on the mountain (John 6:14–15), staying until evening. Some copies add "and he prayed there". Lutheran theologian Harold H. Buls considers that "this event must have been a great source of temptation, and therefore He needed to pray. He needed to pray also for His disciples". The Syriac, Ethiopic, and Persic versions leave out the word "again"; and the latter, contrary to all others, renders it, "Christ departed from the mountain alone".

St. Augustine suggests that in their desire to make Jesus king by force, they erred both in thinking of an earthly kingdom, and in thinking that the time for the kingdom of God had now arrived. "He was certainly not such a king as would be made by men, but such as would bestow a kingdom on men". Augustine notes that "He had come now, not to reign immediately, as He is to reign in the sense in which we pray, Thy kingdom come".

The disciples set off by boat to cross back to Capernaum on the north-western side of the lake, leaving without Jesus (John 6:16–17):

[Jesus' disciples] got into the boat, and went over the sea toward Capernaum. And it was already dark, and Jesus had not come to them.

This was a westward journey which should have allowed them to follow the coast, but for a north wind coming down from the upper Jordan valley, and the disciples are forced out into the sea. From John 6:22 it seems that this boat carrying the disciples was the only one to make the journey across the sea and the crowd in general remained overnight on the eastern shore.

== Jesus walks on the sea ==
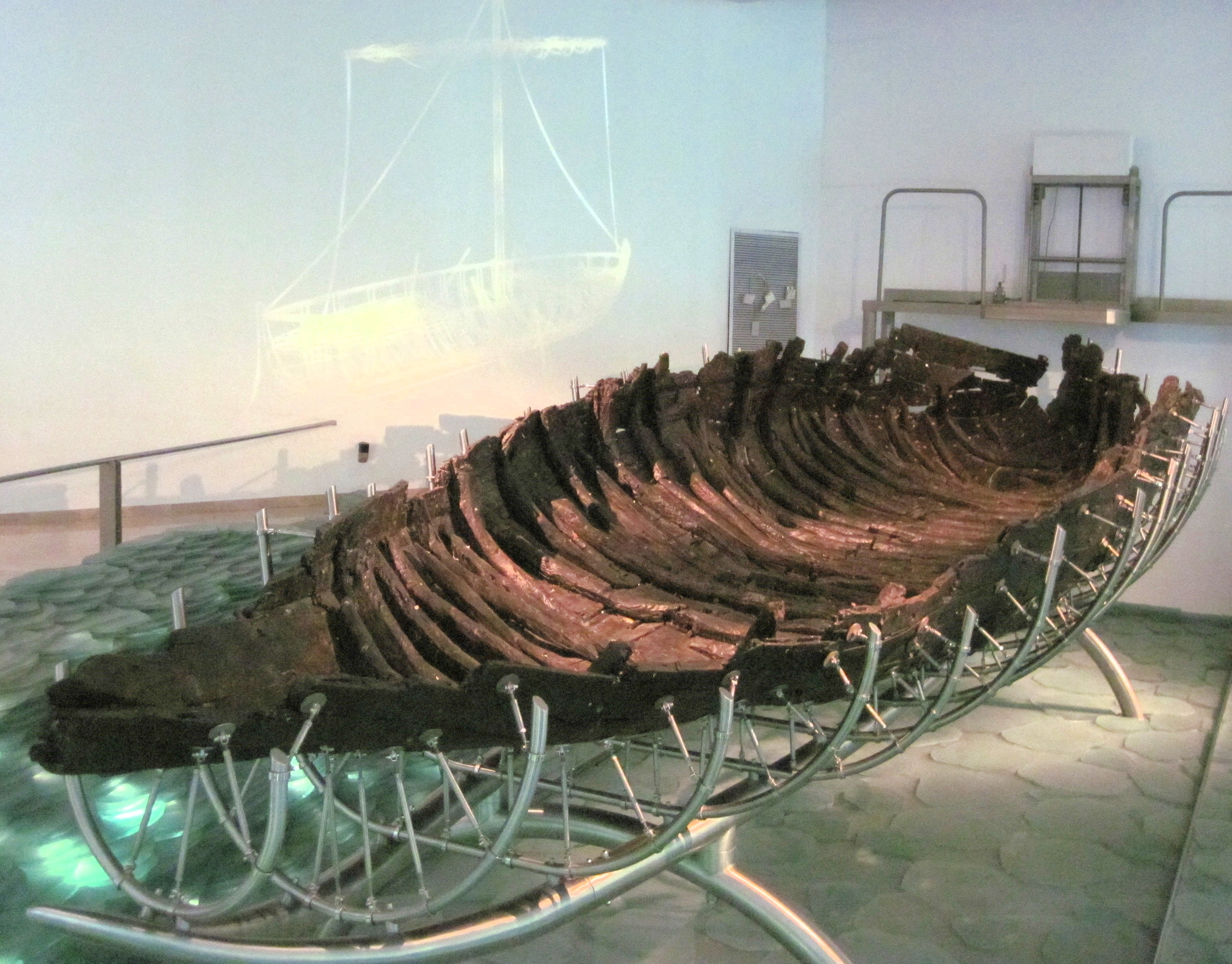
The 'Ancient Sea of Galilee Boat' from 1st century, now housed in the Yigal Allon Museum in Kibbutz Ginosar

=== Verse 17 ===
And entered into a ship, and went over the sea toward Capernaum. And it was now dark, and Jesus was not come to them.

They boarded "a ship", that is, a "boat" that was large enough to hold the twelve disciples. After a period of drought and low lake levels in 1986 a fishing boat from the first century CE was discovered on the western shore of the Sea of Galilee, which can now be seen in the Yigal Allon Museum in Kibbutz Ginosar north of Tiberias, with the size (of the remains) of 27 feet (8.2 m) long and 7.5 feet (2.3 m) wide, equipped with a mast for a sail and could be rowed by four rowers. The boat is now known as the "Jesus boat" or the "Sea of Galilee boat" although there is no known historical connection with Jesus or his disciples, but it has provided much information about design and construction of boats on the Sea of Galilee in that period.

When the disciples had rowed about twenty five or thirty stadia (three or four miles), and were therefore in "the broadest portion of the lake", they saw Jesus walking on the sea and drawing near their boat. At its widest, the lake is about five miles broad. The disciples "willingly receive Jesus into the boat, and immediately the boat was at the land where they were going" (i.e. Capernaum) (John 6:21). Theologian John Gill, taking his lead from the 4th or 5th century poet Nonnus, discusses whether this verse indicated an additional miracle of "immediate travel":

not only the wind ceased, but another miracle was wrought; the ship was in an instant at the place whither they intended to go.

The word in Greek: ευθεως is translated as "immediately" in most English translations but "presently" in the Douai Rheims version. The Pulpit Commentary notes a number of occasions in the New Testament where ευθεως does not "mean instantaneously, but simply that the next thing to notice or observe".

== The crowd search for Jesus ==
The following day, the crowd, who had remained on the other side of the lake, noticed that only the one boat had been there, and that Jesus had not embarked on it with the disciples, but that they had in fact gone off by themselves.

— John 6:22 in J. B. Phillips' Translation

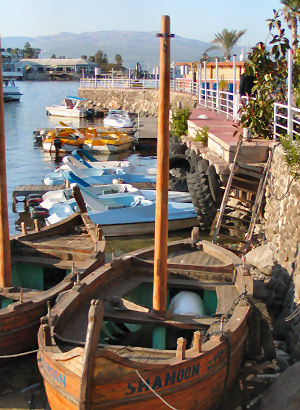
Tiberias harbor

Plummer considers that "We have here a complicated sentence very unusual in S. John (but compare John 13:1–4); it betrays a certain literary awkwardness, but great historical accuracy ... the structure of the sentence is no argument against the truth of the statements which it contains." Boats arrive from Tiberias, the new city built by Herod Antipas on the western side of the lake, and the crowd use these boats to travel to Capernaum in search of Jesus. The Geneva Bible and the King James Version describe the boats as "shipping"; the Disciples' Literal New Testament describes them as "small boats"; and Bengel's Gnomen identifies them as "small vessels".

The crowd find Jesus "on the other side of the sea" (verse 25); they ask him, "Rabbi, when did You come here?" Jesus does not answer their question or satisfy their curiosity. George Leo Haydock suggests that he does not answer their words, "but he replied to their thoughts". Jesus comments in verse 26 that people had been looking for him, not because of the signs they had seen but because they had eaten of the loaves and were filled, although in verse 14 the evangelist had testified that they had seen the sign that Jesus did and from this sign they had recognised Him as the prophet foretold by Moses. The Pulpit Commentary argues that the distinction reflects their superficial understanding:

you did not get beyond the outward seeming, the superficial phenomenon, you revealed, by thus rushing to the conclusion that I was your Prophet and King, that you did not really discern the sign I gave, and ye are seeking me now, not because you have really seen "signs" – but because ye ate of the (those) loaves, and were filled up by this temporary supply of your daily want, expecting today some new, some more impressive, characteristic of the Messianic kingdom than yesterday.

== Discourse in the Capernaum synagogue (verses 25–58) ==
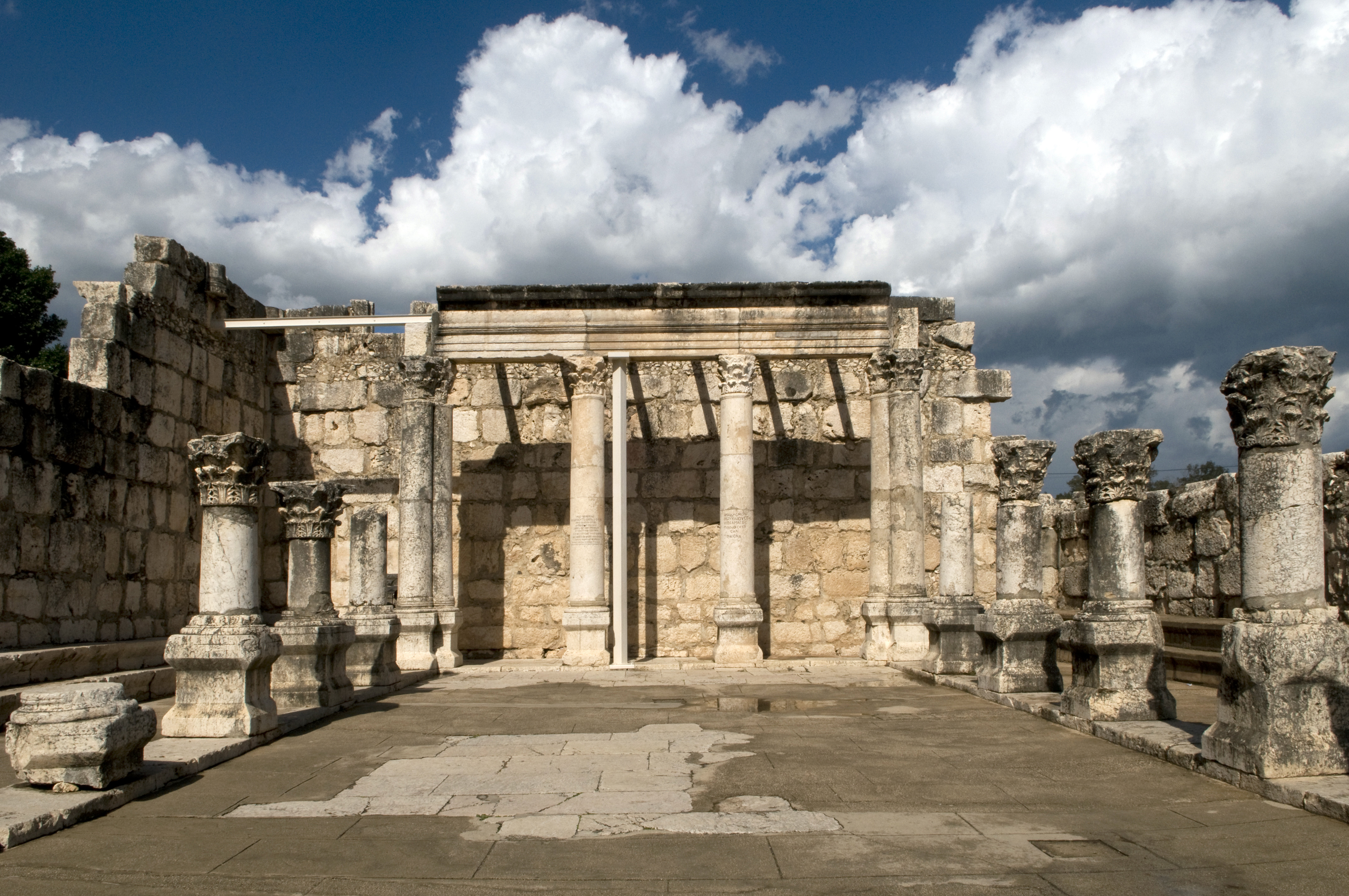
Ruins of the ancient Great Synagogue at Capernaum (or Kfar Nahum) from 4th century CE.

Verses 25 to 58 present a series of dialogues and discourses which are set within the synagogue in Capernaum (cf. verse 59), and comparable to Jesus' previous dialogues with Nicodemus (chapter 3) and the Samaritan woman (chapter 4): Plummer calls the whole of this section "the Discourse on the Son as the Support of Life".

=== Verses 25–34 ===
The first section (verses 25 to 34) presents a dialogue between Jesus and the Jews:

- "Do not labor for the food (or meat) (Note: The translation is given as "meat" in the King James Version and other older texts, but "food" is considered a better translation: "'meat' in the sense of 'flesh-meat' is not intended.) which perishes, but for the food which endures to everlasting life, which the Son of Man will give you, because God the Father has set His seal on Him." (John 6:2)
- "What shall we do, that we may work the works of God?" (John 6:28)
- "This is the work of God, that you believe in Him whom He sent." (John 6:29)
- "What sign will You perform then, that we may see it and believe You? What work will You do? Our fathers ate the manna in the desert; as it is written, 'He gave them bread from heaven to eat.'" (John 6:30–31)
- "Most assuredly, I say to you, Moses did not give you the bread from heaven, but My Father gives you the true bread from heaven. For the bread of God is He who comes down from heaven and gives life to the world." (John 6:32–33)
- "Lord (or Sir) (Greek: κυριε), give us this bread always." (John 6:34)

The link between toil or painful labour (sorrow in the King James Version, travail in the Wycliffe Bible) and obtaining food was established in Genesis 3:17, and the writer of Ecclesiastes observed that "all the labour of man is for his mouth, and yet the appetite is not filled" (Ecclesiastes 6:7). William Robertson Nicoll noted in the Expositor's Greek Testament that even "the food which [Jesus] had given them the evening before He called 'food which perishes' (Greek: βρῶσιν ἀπολλυμένην): they were already hungry again, and had toiled after Him for miles to get another meal". Instead Jesus promises a different type of food which his hearers should work for: the food which endures to everlasting life (Greek: βρωσιν την μενουσαν εις ζωην αιωνιον). Many English translations state that Jesus (the Son of Man) will provide the food which endures, but there are variant translations which suggest that the gift Jesus refers to is eternal life, rather than imperishable food. Thus the Living Bible's paraphrase reads:

You shouldn't be so concerned about perishable things like food. No, spend your energy seeking the eternal life that I, the Messiah, can give you.

Meyer notes that the gift which Jesus gives is not being given without "striving and struggling" on the part of those who receive it. Wilhelm Martin Leberecht de Wette sees the match between "working" and "gift" as a "strange" combination.

Also in verse 27, the evangelist refers again to the concept of a seal (Greek: σφραγίς) which he has previously mentioned in John 3:33:

... because God the Father has set His seal on Him.

John the Baptist declared that those who would accept the testimony of Jesus would thereby certify (Greek: εσφραγισεν) that God is true; Jesus here declares that God the Father has set his seal (Greek: εσφραγισεν) on himself. The reformer John Calvin wrote of this declaration:

The ancient writers have misinterpreted and tortured this passage, by maintaining that Christ is said to be sealed, because he is the stamp and lively image of the Father. For he does not here enter into abstruse discussions about his eternal essence, but explains what he has been commissioned and enjoined to do, what is his office in relation to us, and what we ought to seek and expect from him. By an appropriate metaphor, he alludes to an ancient custom; for they sealed with signets what they intended to sanction by their authority. Thus Christ – that it may not appear as if he claimed anything of himself, or by private authority – declares that this office was enjoined on him by the Father, and that this decree of the Father was manifested, as if a seal had been engraven on him.

The distinction between "works" (Greek: τα εργα του θεου) and "work" (Greek: το εργον του θεου) in verses 28-29 provides one of the scriptural foundations for the Protestant doctrine, Sola fide ("faith alone"). Meyer comments:

Instead of the many ἔργα θεοῦ which they, agreeably to their legal standing-point, had in view, Jesus mentions only one ἔργον, in which, however, all that God requires of them is contained – the work (the moral act) of faith.

The dialogue ends with the Jews asking Jesus, "Lord (or Sir) (Greek: κυριε), give us this bread always" (John 6:34). The Voice translation renders 'κυριε' as 'Master', while Plummer argues that:

'Lord' is too strong [a translation], and makes the request too much like the prayer of a humble believer. Our translators wisely vary the rendering of Kyrie, using sometimes 'Lord', and sometimes 'Sir'. Here, as in the conversation with the Samaritan woman, 'Sir' would be better.

=== Verses 35–58 ===
In reply, Jesus makes a declaration:

I am the bread of life. He who comes to Me shall never hunger, and he who believes in Me shall never thirst.

— John 6:35

Coming to Jesus is equated to believing in Him. Although the Greek: εἶπεν generally means "said", the New International Version translates it more formally as "declared". This is the first of seven occasions in John's Gospel where Jesus makes a declaration in the form "I am ...". Lutheran theologian Rudolf Ewald Stier counted 35 references to "I" or "me" by Jesus in the remainder of this discourse.

At some stage, Jesus must have said to the Galileans, or possibly to others:

You have seen Me and yet do not believe.

He refers back to that saying now, but there is no other record of this saying. "Some have supposed it to refer to an unrecorded conversation (Alford, Westcott), or even to some written sentence which is now a lost fragment of the discourse". The interplay between seeing and believing is often referred to in John's Gospel: for example, in John 6:30, the Jews ask for a sign, so that they may see and believe; after Jesus' resurrection, the "disciple who reached the tomb first" went into the tomb, "he saw, and he believed" (John 20:8); a week later, Thomas, called the twin, "believed because he had seen" (John 20:29, a), and Jesus commended all "those who have not seen and yet have believed" (John 20:29, b). According to John 6:40, it is the will of God that "everyone who sees ... and believes ... may have everlasting life".

Jesus refers to his incarnation as a mission to fulfil the will of his Father, who had sent him (John 6:38). His mission is 'conservative' in the sense that he is expected "not to lose anything from what he has been given", and 'eschatological' in that he is to raise up the gift of his Father on the last day (John 6:39). Several commentators have noted that "All that the Father gives the Son" (Greek: παν ο διδωσιν μοι ο πατηρ) (John 6:37) is a singular neuter noun: "the whole mass, so to speak, is gifted by the Father to the Son as a unity". Jesus' words about his Father's intention, that he should not "lose anything from what he has been given", may have been fulfilled at his arrest (John 18:9) when he confirms that he is "Jesus of Nazareth", the one his arresters are looking for, and asks that "these others" be let go. In his High Priestly prayer, Jesus also confirms that "none of them is lost except the son of perdition".

== Rejected by his own ==
The Jews, including Jesus' disciples, complained among themselves (John 6:41, 43, 52, 60). The features of Jesus' teaching which were challenged were:

- His claim to have come down from heaven
- His statement, "I am the bread which came down from heaven"
- His offer to believers to eat his flesh (and, by extension, to drink his blood).

These sayings appear to have stimulated collective debate and intellectual difficulty. The Common English Bible portrays the Jewish community in 'debate' about Jesus' sayings, whereas the Disciples' Literal New Testament says they were 'fighting'. Augustine said that they "strove among themselves" because they did not understand the bread of peace, unlike those who ate the bread of life, "for God makes them to dwell in unity". John Wycliffe used the words 'grutched' or 'grumbled'; the word in Greek: ἐγγόγυζον was "constantly used in the Septuagint of the murmuring of Israel in the wilderness". John Gill's commentaries highlight the Jews' consistency: they grumbled "for want of bread" in the desert, and they grumbled about Jesus' teaching "when they found that he spoke of himself as the true bread, the bread of God, and bread of life". For Jesus' disciples, his teaching was challenging. The Disciples' Literal New Testament regards it as "not hard to understand, but hard to accept, offensive, harsh, objectionable".

Jesus' claim to "have come down from heaven" is dismissed on the basis of local knowledge of Jesus and his parents:

"Is not this Jesus, the son of Joseph, whose father and mother we know? How is it then that He says, 'I have come down from heaven'?"

— John 6:42

The Pulpit Commentary notes that the evangelist does not here make reference to the virgin birth or the synoptic gospels' accounts of the conception and birth of Jesus:

The difficulty that besets this passage is rather the silence of John, both here and elsewhere, concerning the manner of the Lord's birth. He, who knew the mother of Jesus, and must have been acquainted with the language of Matthew and Luke, says nothing in vindication of the words of the Lord. Here was an opportunity for putting the "Jews" in the wrong, by endorsing the synoptic account, which he did not embrace. ... his silence is remarkable. It is best accounted for by the fact that he was evermore looking to the moral, spiritual significance of all the miracles he records, as well as of those to which he vaguely refers. [John] is content with the words of Jesus. They are the surest explanation of the synoptic narrative. The Jews, on the basis of their general knowledge, are struck with consternation. How (now) therefore doth he say, I have come down out of heaven? This was not an irrational nor a malignant criticism. This question must have been asked by those who heard for the first time the stupendous claim.

Nor does John's account make reference to the brothers of Jesus, unlike comparable sections of the synoptic gospels:

"Is this not the carpenter, the Son of Mary, and brother of James, Joses, Judas, and Simon? And are not His sisters here with us?" So they were offended at Him.

— Mark 6:3

== Many disciples turn away ==
=== Verse 59 ===
These things said he in the synagogue, as he taught in Capernaum.

Verse 59 implies a break in the narrative: the preceding verses represent Jesus' teaching to the Jewish community in the Capernaum synagogue, whereas the following verses portray his private discussions with the disciples struggling to grasp the meaning of his teaching. These followers were "the disciples in the wider sense; those who more or less fully were accepting his teaching, and were regarded as His followers" but their reaction was now to think:

This is an hard saying; who can hear it?

— John 6:60

This teaching was "not merely harsh, but insufferable". Theologian Albert Barnes commented that "The word 'hard' here means 'offensive, disagreeable' – that which they could not bear. Some have understood it to mean 'difficult to be understood', but this meaning does not suit the connection. The doctrine which he delivered was opposed to their prejudices; it seemed to be absurd, and they therefore rejected it." Jesus' response, "Does this offend you? What then if you should see the Son of Man ascend where He was before? (John 6:60–61) could be interpreted as:

Does this saying stumble you? Will you not be much more scandalized if you see the Son of Man ascending where He was before?

or it could mean

Will you not then be convinced?

William Robertson Nicoll suggests that "the second interpretation gives the better sense: you will find it easier to believe I came down from heaven, when you see me returning thither". In John's Gospel, Jesus' ascension "to where he was before" takes place through his death and resurrection: the Ascension on the Mount of Olives 40 days after Jesus' resurrection is not recorded in John's Gospel.

The evangelist notes that Jesus lost some of his following from that [time] or "at this point" or "for this reason". The text makes clear that "many left Him" and "no longer walked with Him". Jesus then asks "the twelve" whether they would also walk away (John 6:67). This is John's first reference to "the twelve": they have not previously been mentioned as a group or as the "twelve apostles", nor have twelve named disciples yet been introduced. (In John 1, Andrew and Simon Peter, Philip and Nathaniel were named; Judas, son of Simon Iscariot is here named as one of the twelve whom Jesus had "chosen"). On behalf of the twelve, Simon Peter replies:

Lord, to whom shall we go? You have the words of eternal life. Also we have come to believe and know that You are the Christ, the Son of the living God.

— John 6:68–69

The New International Version adopts the alternative translation found in some texts:

You are the Holy One of God.

Peter's acclamation concludes a journey of learning and faith: "we have come to believe and to know ...". Buls instead translates "we have realized ...". The disciples "[take] Peter's answer to [Jesus'] question as delivered in the name of them all, and as expressing their mind and sense".

Jesus answered them, "Did I not choose you, the twelve, and one of you is a devil?" (John 6:70).

Verse 71 appears to have been added by an editor: "the editor seeks to rescue Peter from the rejection saying of the Lord in verse 70. Jesus can't have called Peter 'a devil'; he must have meant Judas, the obvious traitor – so the editor appears to have reasoned". The final verse of the chapter is written in the third person style with reference to Jesus because the Evangelist explains the meaning of the previous Word of God. Despite the latter statement and as it was said before, John 6:70 has also a possible secondary reference to the Cefa' temporary betrayment of Jesus again predicted in John 13:31–38.

At this point, the division of the text into chapters (attributed to Stephen Langton) brings chapter 6 to its close. Chapter 7 starts with the decision of Jesus to avoid travelling in Judea, "because the Jews sought to kill Him".

== See also ==
- Bread of Life Discourse
- Capernaum
- Jesus Christ
- Manna
- Sea of Galilee
- Related Bible parts: Exodus 16, Matthew 14, Mark 6, Luke 9, John 8, John 10, John 14, John 15

== Notes ==
Preceded by John 5	Chapters of the Bible; Gospel of John	Succeeded by John 7
