= John 7 =

- ← chapter 6 chapter 8 →
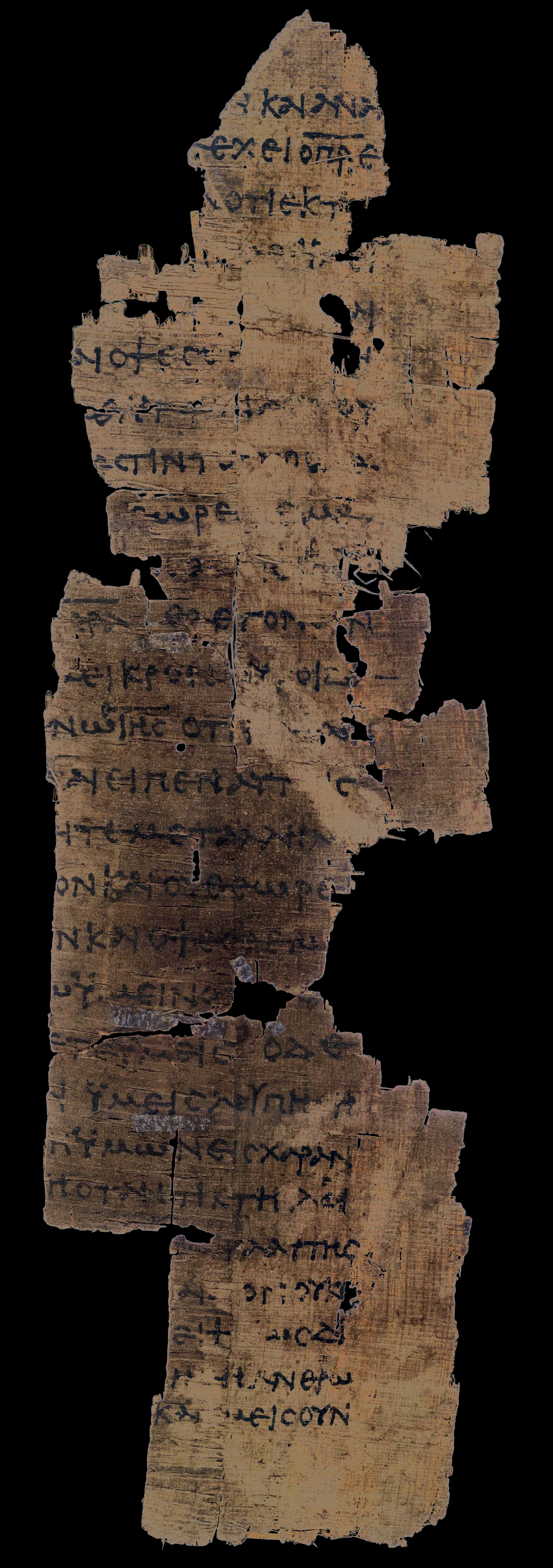
- John 16:14-22 on the recto side of Papyrus 5, written about AD 250
- Book: Gospel of John
- Category: Gospel
- Christian Bible part: New Testament
- Order in the Christian part: 4

John 7 is the seventh chapter of the Gospel of John in the New Testament of the Christian Bible. It recounts Jesus' visit to Jerusalem for the feast of Tabernacles, the possibility of his arrest and debate as to whether he is the Messiah. The gospel identifies an unnamed "disciple whom Jesus loved" as its source and possible author. Early Christian tradition uniformly affirmed that John composed this Gospel. Alfred Plummer, in the Cambridge Bible for Schools and Colleges, describes this chapter as "very important for the estimate of the fourth Gospel. In it the scene of the Messianic crisis shifts from Galilee to Jerusalem; and, as we should naturally expect, the crisis itself becomes hotter. The divisions, the doubts, the hopes, the jealousies, and the casuistry of the Jews are vividly portrayed." John 7:1 to 8:59 is sometimes referred to as the "Tabernacles Discourse". Raymond E. Brown describes the Tabernacles Discourse as "a polemic collection of what Jesus said in replies to attacks by the Jewish authorities on his claims".

== Text ==
The original text was written in Koine Greek. Some early manuscripts containing the text of this chapter are:

- Papyrus 75 (AD 175–225)
- Papyrus 66 (c. 200)
- Codex Vaticanus (325–350)
- Codex Sinaiticus (330–360)
- Codex Bezae (c. 400)
- Codex Alexandrinus (400–440)
- Codex Ephraemi Rescriptus (c. 450; extant verses 1–2)

=== Old Testament references ===
- John 7:2: Leviticus 23
- John 7:19: Exodus 24:3
- John 7:22: Genesis 17:10
- John 7:24: Deuteronomy 1:16
- John 7:37: Leviticus 23:36
- John 7:38: Deuteronomy 18:15
- John 7:39: Joel 2:28
- John 7:51: Deuteronomy 17:10; Deuteronomy 19:15

== Sub-divisions ==
This chapter is divided into 53 verses. The New King James Version includes sub-headings within the chapter as follows:

- John 7:1–9 = Jesus’ Brothers Disbelieve
- John 7:10–24 = The Heavenly Scholar
- John 7:25–31 = Could This Be the Christ?
- John 7:32–36 = Jesus and the Religious Leaders
- John 7:37–39 = The Promise of the Holy Spirit
- John 7:40–44 = Who Is He?
- John 7:45–52 = Rejected by the Authorities
- John 7:53 = An Adulteress Faces the Light of the World (referring to John 7:53-8:12)

== The unbelief of Jesus’ brothers (verses 1–9) ==
The evangelist states that Jesus' brothers (or "brethren" in some translations) did not believe in Him (John 7:5) but they suggest that he goes to Jerusalem for the forthcoming Feast of Tabernacles, which was one of the three feasts which the Book of Deuteronomy prescribes that all Jewish men should attend (Deuteronomy 16:16). They suggest that Jesus wants to publicise his works and that in Galilee his activities are hidden from the view of his Judean disciples (John 7:3–4); instead, Jesus suggests that his brothers attend the feast but he will remain in Galilee. The Feast of Tabernacles began on 'the fifteenth day of the seventh month' (Leviticus 23:34), i.e., the 15th of Tishri, which corresponds to September, so the interval from Passover to Tabernacles is about five months. Jesus says that it is always "their time" to go to Jerusalem, but that "his time" has not yet come.

=== Verse 1 ===
After these things Jesus walked in Galilee: for he would not walk in Jewry, because the Jews sought to kill him.

Chapter 7 opens in Galilee, where the events and discourses of the previous chapter have taken place. In Galilee, Jesus had taught in the synagogue at Capernaum, but many people including many of his own disciples, had refused to believe. John 7:1 implies that nevertheless Jesus felt safe in Galilee, whereas in Judea or "Jewry" (e.g. King James Version), the Jews (or the Jewish ruling authorities) wanted to kill Jesus. He probably did not go to Jerusalem for the Passover mentioned in John 6:4, although theologian John Gill suggested that "he went to Jerusalem, to keep the passover; and finding that the Jews still sought to take away his life, he returned to Galilee, and 'walked' there".

Chapters 5, 6 and 7 all commence with the words μετα ταυτα (meta tauta), "after these things", "a typical Johannine transition" (chapter 7: and after these things).

=== Verse 3 ===
His brothers therefore said to Him, "Depart from here and go into Judea, that Your disciples also may see the works that You are doing".

The "brothers", unlike the "disciples", are still unbelievers. Plummer notes that

It is impossible to determine with certainty whether they (the brothers) are (1) the children of Joseph and Mary, born after the birth of Jesus; (2) the children of Joseph by a former marriage, whether levirate or not; or (3) adopted children... (2) is on the whole the most probable.

He observes the bluntness of the suggestion in verse 3, Depart from here, "given almost as a command", which "shews that they presumed upon their near relationship. It would be more natural in the mouths of men older than Christ, and therefore is in favour of their being sons of Joseph by a former marriage".

=== Verse 4 ===
People don't hide what they are doing if they want to be well known. Since you are doing these things, let the whole world know about you!”

Johann Bengel describes the brothers' reasoning as a use of the rhetorical device diasyrmus. Irish Archbishop John McEvilly sees "selfish motives" in their pressing Jesus to go south.

=== Verse 6 ===
Then Jesus said to them, "My time has not yet come, but your time is always ready".

"My time" (Greek: ὁ καιρὸς ὁ ἐμὸς, ho kairos ho emos) equates to "my hour" (Greek: ἡ ὥρα μου, hē ōra mou) in John 2:4, which had also at that point "not yet come". The Jerusalem Bible notes that "this 'hour', the hour of his glorification and his return to his Father, is determined by the Father and can be anticipated". See also verse 8:

=== Verse 8 ===
[Jesus said to His brothers:] "You go up to the [or this] feast. I am not yet going up to this feast, for My time has not yet fully come."

Plummer suggests that "'this' is wanting in authority; we should read, 'go ye up unto the feast'".

== Feast of Tabernacles (verses 10–52) ==
Jesus does then go to Jerusalem for the feast. The evangelist unfolds his attendance in three steps:

- He initially directs that his brothers will attend but He will remain in Galilee (John 7:9)
- Afterwards he does go to Jerusalem, "not openly, but as it were in secret" (John 7:10, NKJV translation) (Greek: ως εν κρυπτω)
- "But when the middle feast day came, Jesus went up into the temple, and taught" (John 7:14, Wycliffe Bible).

H. W. Watkins supposes that the main party travelling from Galilee to Jerusalem would have taken the route to the east of the River Jordan, and that Jesus took the alternative route through Samaria, as he had done when he travelled back from Jerusalem to Galilee in chapter 4, and the Jamieson-Fausset-Brown Bible Commentary agrees that He may have travelled "perhaps by some other route".

=== Verses 15-17 ===
When Jesus began to teach in the Temple, he was perceived as being uneducated and yet learned, not having received rabbinical, priestly or Sadduceean training, but "knowing his letters" (οὗτος γράμματα οἶδεν, houtos grammata oiden), γράμματα not meaning "the scriptures" as such but what theologian Heinrich Meyer calls "scriptural erudition". Jesus was known not to have learned through contemporary routes of Jewish learning such as the House of Hillel or the House of Shammai, and it is likely that both the content and the style of his teaching were seen as distinct from the teaching of the "Jews" of these schools, to whom the evangelist refers. "His teaching on this occasion was expository", based on the Hebrew Bible: Albert Barnes writes that "Jesus exhibited in his discourses such a profound acquaintance with the Old Testament as to excite [the] amazement and admiration" of other learned scholars, but He explains that His teaching is not His own, "but His who sent Me" (John 7:16). Jesus does not disown His teaching, but He does not claim to be its originator or its authority:

"The 'my' refers to the teaching itself, the 'mine' to the ultimate authority on which it rests. I am not a self-taught Man, as though out of the depths of my own independent human consciousness I span it ... 'He who sent me' gave [it] to me. I have been in intimate communion with HIM. All that I say is Divine thought."

The evangelist has already referred to four witnesses to the validity of Jesus' testimony (John 5:31–47), and now adds that anyone who wants to do God's will know the authority of His teaching (John 7:17).

=== Learned discussion on Laws ===
In a discussion which demonstrates this point to the learned Jews, Jesus then refers to the Mosaic law, and to the law and tradition of the patriarchs. The law of circumcision prescribed by Moses (Leviticus 12:3) originated with God's covenant with Abraham and required every male child to be circumcised on his eighth day. If this day was a Sabbath, the obligation to circumcise that day overrode the obligation to rest on the Sabbath (Exodus 20:8–11). Jews familiar with both laws would also have been familiar with the rule of precedence between them. But Jesus then refers to the healing at the Temple on the Sabbath day of a man who had had an infirmity for thirty-eight years (John 5:8–9), on account of which the Jews wanted to kill Jesus (John 5:16):

"Are you angry with Me because I made a man completely well on the Sabbath?" (John 7:23)

The responses to Jesus' teaching identified in this section are:

- Some people were impressed: "He is good" (John 7:12, a)
- Others said, "No, on the contrary, He deceives the people" (John 7:12, b)
- Discussion is restricted: "no one spoke openly of Him for fear of the Jews" (John 7:13)
- Some people marveled, saying, "How does this Man know letters, having never studied?" (John 7:15)
- Some wanted to kill Him (John 7:19)
- Some suggested He was "crazy and perhaps paranoid": "You have a demon. Who is seeking to kill You?" (John 7:20)
- Some were angry with Him (John 7:23)
- Some recognized Him as the Messiah and believed in Him (John 7:26–31)
- Some denied that He could be the Messiah: "We know where this Man is from; but when the Christ comes, no one knows where He is from" (John 7:27)
- No one laid a hand on Him, because (according to the evangelist), "His hour had not yet come". (John 7:30)

The debate or "murmurings" about whether Jesus could be the Messiah came to the attention of the Pharisees, and they and the Chief Priests "sent officers in order to take him into custody".(John 7:32). In this verse and in verse 7:45, "the reader is for the first time informed that the Pharisees and the chief priests try to arrest Jesus but do not succeed. This anticipates their new initiatives in chapters 9 to 12, where they finally achieve their plans.

=== Jesus' impending departure ===
Then Jesus said "I shall be with you a little while longer, and then I go to Him who sent Me. You will seek Me and not find Me, and where I am you cannot come." (John 7:33–34) The evangelist has noted twice in this chapter that Jesus' time has not yet come (John 7:6 and 7:30, see also John 2:4), but in a little while (Greek: ετι χρονον μικρον), the time will come for Jesus to depart. The word in Greek: ὑπάγω, I go away, is a distinctively Johannine word, used 15 times throughout the gospel. The Pulpit Commentary suggests that "a little while" amounts to six months, as "six months would bring round the last Passover".

The statement "You will seek Me and not find Me, and where I am you cannot come" produces consternation and the Jewish scholars suppose that Jesus might be intending to visit the Jews of the diaspora "where our people live scattered among the Greeks" (John 7:35 - New International Version translation), and also to teach the Greeks themselves. According to Acts 2:5 (referring to the Feast of Pentecost in the year after the Feast of Tabernacles described here), "there were dwelling in Jerusalem Jews, devout men, from every nation under heaven". The Jews therefore contemplate whether Jesus might be planning to visit their home cities and teach in their synagogues. Meyer regards the Jews' supposition as "an insolent and scornful supposition, which they themselves, however, do not deem probable (therefore the question is asked with Greek: μή, not)", non-conformist theologian Philip Doddridge described it as "a sarcasm", and the International Standard Version offers the translation as follows:

==== Verse 35 ====
"Will he go where our people live scattered among the Greeks, and teach the Greeks?"

However, it is not an unreasonable supposition, as the mission to the Jewish diaspora formed "the very mode of proceeding afterwards adopted by the Apostles" and the synoptic gospels represent Jesus as having visited "the region of Tyre and Sidon" to teach, and as having healed there "the daughter of a Greek woman, a Syro-Phoenician by birth" (Mark 7:24–30). The evangelist leaves this section with a question which remains unanswered:

==== Verse 36 ====
"What is this thing that He said, 'You will seek Me and not find Me, and where I am you cannot come'?"

Peter asks the same question of Jesus when He has privately told His disciples that He is leaving them, and "where [He is] going, [they] cannot come". Peter is told "you cannot follow Me now, but you shall follow Me afterwards” (John 13:33–36).

=== The promise of the Holy Spirit ===
==== Verses 37-39 ====
On the last day, that great day of the feast, Jesus stood and cried out, saying,

"If anyone thirsts, let him come to Me and drink.
He who believes in Me, as the Scripture has said, out of his heart will flow rivers of living water."

The Book of Leviticus prescribed that the Feast of Tabernacles should last for seven days, and that on the eighth day:

You shall have a holy convocation, and you shall offer an offering made by fire to the Lord. It is a sacred assembly, and you shall do no customary work on it. (Leviticus 23:36)

On this sacred day, Jesus stood (presumably at the Temple) and cried out:

If anyone thirsts, let him come to Me and drink. He who believes in Me, as the Scripture has said, out of his heart will flow rivers of living water. (John 7:37–38)

Many translations include the scriptural reference within the words Jesus cried out. The Jerusalem Bible breaks up the text in a different manner:

... Jesus stood there and cried out:

"If any man is thirsty, let him come to me!
Let the man come and drink who believes in me!"

As scripture says: From his breast shall flow fountains of living water.

Many Fathers of the Church, from Origen onwards, have reflected on the words of verse 38, "out of his heart shall flow rivers of living water", seen as a reference to "those who, having drunk of Christ, put their faith in him".

The quoted words, "If anyone thirsts, let him come to Me and drink" is a reference to Isaiah 55:1. Meyer explains that "there is no exactly corresponding passage, indeed, in Scripture" for the words out of his heart will flow rivers of living water. He suggests that "it is simply a free quotation harmonizing in thought with parts of various passages, especially Isaiah 44:3, 55:1 and 58:11". The writer himself notes, explaining the figurative expressions of Christ, that Jesus was speaking of the [Holy] Spirit, whom those believing in him would receive (later): "the [Holy] Spirit had not yet been given, because Jesus was not yet glorified" (John 7:39). Literally, the text states "the (Holy) Spirit was not yet", but this "strange and startling statement" is best read as "the Holy Ghost (Spirit) was not yet given; the word "given" is not in the original text; but is very properly supplied, as it is in the Vulgate Latin, Syriac, and Persic versions. The Arabic version renders it, "for the Holy Ghost was not yet come".

==== Verses 40-41 ====
Some portion of Jesus' audience, on hearing His words, said "this is certainly the Prophet" (John 7:40). In the Textus Receptus and English translations drawn from it, the number described as recognizing Jesus as the Prophet is Greek: πολλοὶ, many, but Watkins advises that "the reading of the best manuscripts is, some of the people therefore, when they heard these sayings ..." The reference is to the prophet foretold by Moses in Deuteronomy 18:15, who was expected to precede the coming of the Messiah. Others went further: "This is the Christ" (John 7:41).

The people of Jerusalem, debating at John 7:27 whether Jesus could be the Messiah, cast doubt on this interpretation of Jesus' works because "when the Christ comes, no one [will] know where He is from".

==== Verse 42 ====
In John 7:42, some of the crowd reason that "the Christ [will] come from the seed of David and from the town of Bethlehem, where David was" and therefore Jesus, who came from Galilee, could not be the Messiah:

Has not the Scripture said that the Christ comes from the seed of David and from the town of Bethlehem, where David was?”

It is written in Micah 5:2:

But you, Bethlehem Ephrathah, though you are small among the clans of Judah, out of you will come for me one who will be ruler over Israel, whose origins are from of old, from ancient times (Micah 5:2 NIV)

The Gospels of Matthew and Luke give an account of how Jesus of Nazareth in Galilee could also be from Bethlehem, as He was born there, but John's Gospel has no parallel account. The Pulpit Commentary identifies a number of theologians (De Wette, Baur, Weisse, Keim and others) who "have tried to prove from this that the evangelist was ignorant of Christ's birth at Bethlehem", whereas Bengel argued that "John takes [this] for granted as known from the other evangelists".

==== Verse 43 ====
So opinion about Jesus was "divided" (John 7:43) - a Greek: σχίσμα arose, "whence our word ‘schism’, meaning 'a serious and possibly violent division'" is derived. This division extended to the issue of whether Jesus should be arrested: "some of them" - "i.e. [some] of those who refused to accord him Messianic reception because he had not commenced his ministry at Bethlehem, and had not flaunted his Davidic ancestry" - wanted to arrest Him, but "no one laid a hand on him" (John 7:44). The chief priests and the Pharisees questioned why Jesus had not been detained - in John 7:32 they had dispatched officers for this purpose - and the returning officers replied that "No man ever spoke like this Man" (John 7:46). Ellicott states that "some of the oldest manuscripts, including the Vatican, have a shorter text, Never man spake thus; but the longer reading is to be preferred", with the additional words Greek: ὡς οὗτος λαλεῖ ὁ ἄνθρωπος, as this man speaks, which are retained by the Textus Receptus. The officers "were so impressed and awed with what he said that they dared not take him"; the Pharisees said they were "deceived" (John 7:47), suggesting that none of the rulers - "the members of the Sanhedrin, who were supposed to have control over the religious rites and doctrines of the nation - had believed. The evangelist reminds his readers that Nicodemus, "one of them" (i.e. one of the Sanhedrin) had met Jesus before (John 3:1–21). Nicodemus reminds his colleagues:

==== Verse 51 ====
"Does our law judge a man before it hears him and knows what he is doing?"

This is reminder of the words in Deuteronomy 1:16:

You shall not show partiality in judgment; you shall hear the small and the great alike (Deuteronomy 1:16)

The Sanhedrin advises Nicodemus that he should study the scriptures further:

==== Verse 52 ====
They answered and said to him, "Are you also from Galilee? Search and look, for no prophet has arisen out of Galilee."

== Pericope Adulterae (John 7:53–8:11) ==
=== Verse 53 ===
And everyone went to his own house.

At this point, the division of the text into chapters (attributed to Stephen Langton) brings chapter 7 to its close, with the words "Then they all went home". Chapter 8 opens with the words "[b]ut Jesus went to the Mount of Olives". Young's Literal Translation and the Jerusalem Bible both unite these phrases as a single sentence. Bengel argues for Jesus' visit to the Mount of Olives to be treated as part of chapter 7. The Pulpit Commentary queries whether the departure home refers only to the breaking up of the Sanhedrin (with Barnes) or to "the scattering of the crowd or the return of the pilgrims to Galilee". The pilgrims' return home at the end of the Feast of Tabernacles provides a natural end to the chapter, but "a very improbable consequence of verse 52".

The pericope commencing with John 7:53 is considered canonical, but not found in most of the early Greek Gospel manuscripts. It is not in P^{66} or in P^{75}, both of which have been assigned to the late 100s or early 200s. Nor is it in two important manuscripts produced in the early/mid 300s, Sinaiticus and Vaticanus. The first surviving Greek manuscript to contain the pericope is the Latin/Greek diglot Codex Bezae, produced in the 400s or 500s (but displaying a form of text which has affinities with "Western" readings used in the 100s and 200s). Codex Bezae is also the earliest surviving Latin manuscript to contain it. Out of 23 Old Latin manuscripts of John 7-8, seventeen contain at least part of the pericope, and represent at least three transmission-streams in which it was included. The New King James Version includes the text with the explanation that the words from John 7:53 to 8:11 are bracketed by NU-Text "as not original. They are present in over 900 manuscripts of John" and the Jerusalem Bible claims "the author of this passage is not John".

== See also ==
- Bethlehem
- David
- Jesus Christ
- Nicodemus
- Seed of David
- Sukkot
- Related Bible parts: Isaiah 55, Micah 5, Matthew 2, Luke 2, John 3, John 8, John 9, John 10

== Sources ==
- Kieffer, René (2007). "60. John". In Barton, John; Muddiman, John (eds.). The Oxford Bible Commentary (first (paperback) ed.). Oxford University Press. pp. 960–1000. ISBN 978-0199277186.

Preceded by John 6	Chapters of the Bible; Gospel of John	Succeeded by John 8
