= P28 =

P28 may refer to:

- Consolidated P-28, an American prototype fighter aircraft
- INS Kamorta (P28), a stealth corvette of the Indian Navy
- Papyrus 28, a biblical manuscript
- Percival P.28 Proctor, a British radio trainer and communications aircraft
- Phosphorus-28, an isotope of phosphorus
- P28, a Latvian state regional road
