= Frank Hogan (disambiguation) =

Frank Hogan (1902–1974) was an American lawyer and politician.

Frank Hogan may also refer to:

- Frank Hogan (footballer) (born 1936), Australian rules footballer
- Frank J. Hogan (1877–1944), American lawyer
- Frank Hogan, Irish man who brings the John 3:7 sign to events
