= John 3:7 (sign) =

Sign at Gaelic games matches in Ireland

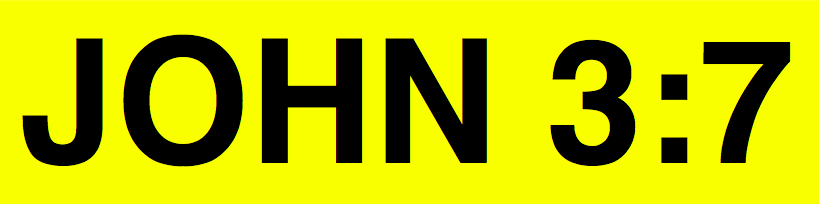
The JOHN 3:7 sign. "Do not marvel that I said to you, ‘You must be born again.’"

A sign with the legend "JOHN 3:7" was often seen at Gaelic games stadiums in Ireland. It referred to a verse in the Gospel of John and for over two decades was displayed by fan Frank Hogan during matches.

The sign featured in the national media following its second disappearance in August 2009: Hogan launched an extensive, and ultimately successful, media campaign for its return before the next match. During that brief disappearance, bookmakers offered odds as to where it might next reappear and Paddy Power offered to purchase a replacement. The sign is so recognisable that, according to Hogan, "everybody wants to steal it or buy it. People regard it as a trophy." However, this recognition would also make it difficult for anyone else to display the sign in the event of its theft.

== Verse ==
The seventh verse of the third chapter of the Gospel of John reads, "Do not marvel that I said to you, ‘You must be born again.’" (Greek: Μὴ θαυμάσῃς ὅτι εἴπόν σοι, Δεῖ ὑμᾶς γεννηθῆναι ἄνωθεν; Mḕ thaumásēis hóti eípon soi, Deî hymâs gennēthênai ánōthen.)

== Symbolism ==
Hogan, originally from County Tipperary, but living in County Limerick, carried the John 3:7 sign as "a reminder that Jesus died for the sins of man". Hogan originally had a sign which read "John 3:16" but changed this to the well known JOHN 3:7 after a Michael Jackson concert in Páirc Uí Chaoimh in 1988.

== History ==
Some time after Hogan started bringing the sign to the GAA games, Shane O'Brien started taking it to various events around Ireland like the Rose of Tralee, Galway Races, Cork Jazz Festival etc.... After doing this for a while he started recruiting a team to work with him on the streets at these festivals, and at weekends in Dublin. Some of this team also bring signs to GAA games to which Hogan can't make it. Since 2008, with the help of Philip Thompson, other teams have been formed in cities across Ireland and Britain. They just stand there on the streets with the signs ready to talk with anyone who stops to ask. Hogan said, "People ask me what it means and I can tell them because they have asked."

In June 2010, Hogan was banned from displaying the sign in Croke Park. However, stadium director Peter McKenna claimed this was a mistake and that Hogan and the sign would be welcome in Croke Park any time.

=== Disappearances ===
The sign was first tossed from a train window by some fanatical supporters. Hogan reported the sign missing again after a train journey which he undertook to return home from the All-Ireland Senior Football Championship quarter-final between Kildare and Tyrone at Croke Park, Dublin on 2 August 2009. Hogan had placed the billboard between carriages, and he first feared it had been stolen when "a lot of fellows got off and I discovered my sign was missing" as the train passed through Kildare. After quizzing some of his fellow passengers, some suggested that there had been jokes about stealing the sign from some of those who had left the train. Hogan immediately contacted the Gardaí (police). CCTV footage of the train journey was viewed but the sign was not found.

During its disappearance, bookmakers offered odds as to where it might next reappear, including such novelty bets as Gaelic games stadium Croke Park where it had last been displayed at a match, a lap dancing club, Dáil Éireann, the music festival Oxegen in 2010, or at religious sites such as Knock in County Mayo and the holy tree stump of Rathkeale in County Limerick. Paddy Power also offered to purchase a replacement. The sign eventually turned up at Kildare Garda station in time for the All-Ireland Senior Hurling Championship semi-final between Limerick and Tipperary. After making contact with the Leinster Leader newspaper, Hogan had returned from Dublin following an appearance on The Marian Finucane Show, when he was informed that the sign had been retrieved. It then emerged that the sign had spent an evening in a Kildare public house before embarking on a minibus journey to the south of the country via Kildangan.

=== Death ===
Hogan was absent from Croke Park for several years due to illness and died in March 2020.

== Cultural references ==
At the 2001 All-Ireland Senior Hurling Championship Final, Galway fans came up with their own sign, "EUGENE 2:11". This was in reference to Galway full-forward Eugene Cloonan, who scored 2–11 in the semi-final against Kilkenny that same year.

On 1 November 2009, the Irish-language television channel TG4 first aired a documentary about Frank Hogan and the JOHN 3:7 sign.

Holding such signs is not unique to Ireland. It can be seen at many televised events in the United States. One famous practitioner in that country is the Rainbow Man.

A John 3:7 sign was present in the crowd during the Buffalo Bills historic comeback versus the Houston Oilers in a 1993 National Football League playoff game.

At Bledisloe Cup, International rugby match New Zealand v Australia, August 17, 2019, in Eden Park, Auckland. John 3 : 7 sign was displayed by Kilkenny & Tipperary hurling supporters. It was on the eve of the 2019 All-Ireland Senior Hurling Championship Final

A John 3:7 sign can be seen at WrestleMania 8, on April 5, 1992. It was seen during Bret Hart and Roddy Piper match.
