= John 4 =

- ← chapter 3 chapter 5 →
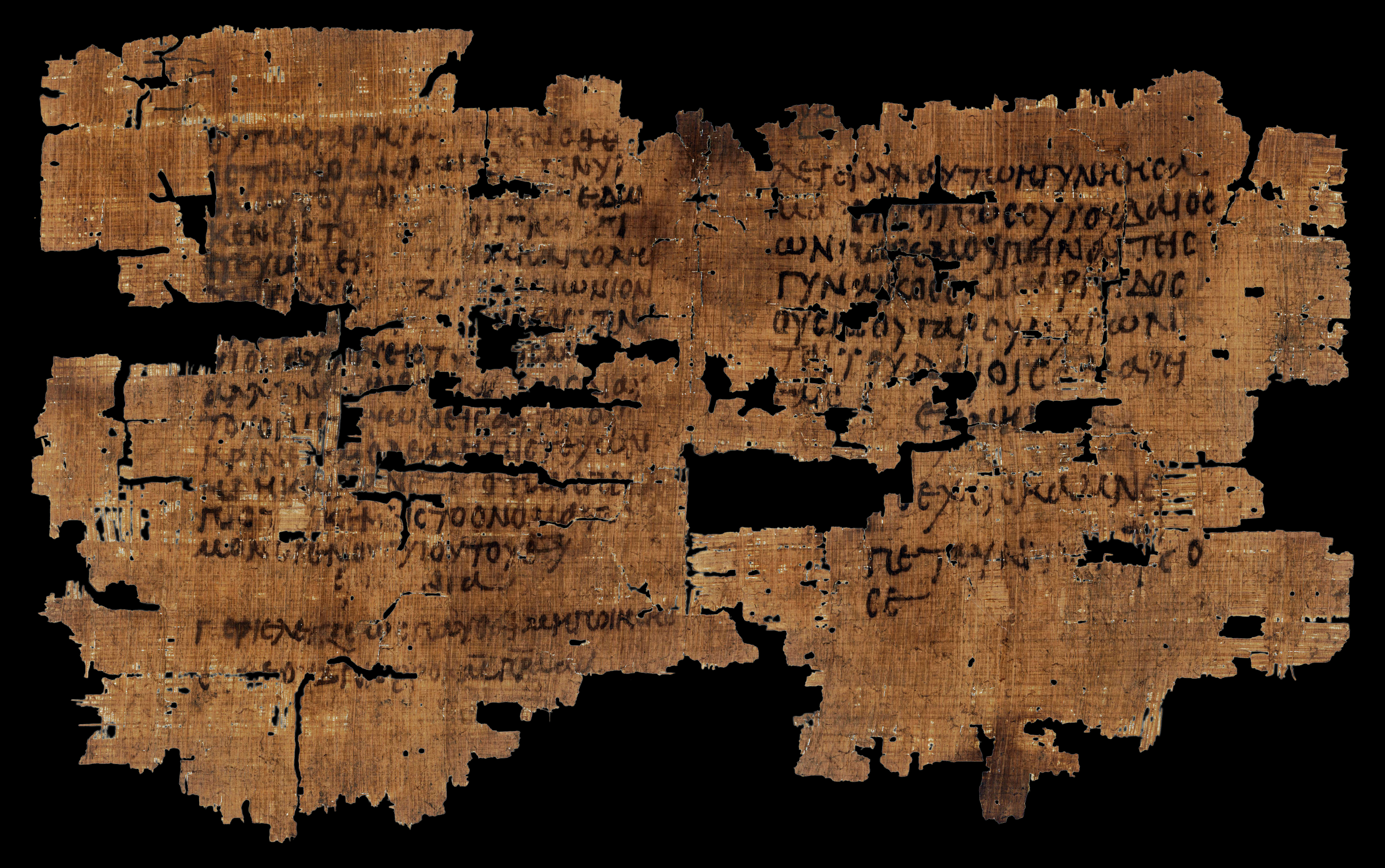
- John 4:9-10 on the recto side of Papyrus 63, c. AD 500
- Book: Gospel of John
- Category: Gospel
- Christian Bible part: New Testament
- Order in the Christian part: 4

John 4 is the fourth chapter of the Gospel of John in the New Testament of the Christian Bible. The major part of this chapter (verses 1-42) recalls Jesus' conversation with a Samaritan woman at the well in Sychar. In verses 43-54, he returns to Galilee, where he heals a royal official's son.

== Text ==
The original text was written in Koine Greek. This chapter is divided into 54 verses. Some early manuscripts containing the text of this chapter are:

- Papyrus 75 (AD 175–225)
- Papyrus 66 (c. 200)
- Codex Vaticanus (325–350)
- Codex Sinaiticus (330–360)
- Codex Bezae (c. 400)
- Codex Alexandrinus (400–440)
- Codex Ephraemi Rescriptus (c. 450; complete)
- Papyrus 63 (c. 500; extant verses 9–10)

== Old Testament references ==
- John 4:5: Genesis 23:19; Genesis 48:12; Joshua 14:13
- John 4:18: 2 Kings 17:24.

== Structure ==
Rene Kieffer divides the chapter into two parts:

- Verses 1-42 serve an essentially didactic purpose: they present a story with a number of "concrete starting-points for discussions about spiritual matters", including the setting at Jacob's Well, the Samaritan woman's "many husbands", the food that the disciples will bring to Jesus, and "the time of harvest";
- Verses 43-54: another narrative with links to synoptic gospel passages such as Matthew 8:15-30 and Luke 7:1-10.

== Jesus leaves Judea (verses 1–4) ==
The Pharisees learn that Jesus is baptizing more people than John the Baptist. John 4:2 notes that "... in fact it was not Jesus who baptized, but his disciples", although John 3:26 clearly suggests that Jesus himself was baptizing - "that man who was with you (John the Baptist) on the other side of the Jordan". In the early church, baptizing may have been a task which was delegated to ministers or deacons: Lutheran commentator Johann Bengel notes that in Acts 10:48, Peter "commanded [the new believers] to be baptized" but did not baptize them himself. Jesus ('the Lord' in the Textus Receptus and the Westcott-Hort translation) learns this, leaves Judea, and sets off to return to Galilee. Swedish-based commentator René Kieffer notes that "his departure seems to be the consequence of the Pharisees' negative reaction to his success in Judea, but that reason remains unsatisfactory, because the Pharisees also had some influence in Galilee. In Eugene H. Peterson's paraphrase, The Message, the wording states that "Jesus realized that the Pharisees were keeping count of the baptisms that he and John performed (although his disciples, not Jesus, did the actual baptizing). They had posted the score that Jesus was ahead, turning him and John into rivals in the eyes of the people."

Verse 4 records that in order to reach Galilee "it was necessary ... to go through Samaria", although an alternative route through Peraea on the eastern side of the Jordan could have been taken. Josephus spoke of this as the customary way of the Galileans going up during the feasts at Jerusalem. H. W. Watkins, in the 19th-century Anglican bishop Charles Ellicott's commentaries, notes that the Pharisees "took the longer road through Peraea, to avoid contact with the country and people of Samaria". Watkins suggests that the necessity to travel through Samaria was not a matter of geographical necessity but arose from Jesus' purpose, to proclaim "the principles of true religion and worship ... for all nations".

Jesus then goes to the Samarian town of Sychar, and rests after his journey at Jacob's Well, while His disciples go into the town to buy food. The gospel notes that it was "about the sixth hour" i.e. around noon (according to Jewish reckoning), or in the evening (according to Roman reckoning); the events recorded are more consistent with the latter, as noon was not the natural time either for resting after a journey or for drawing water.

== Samaritan woman (verses 5–26) ==
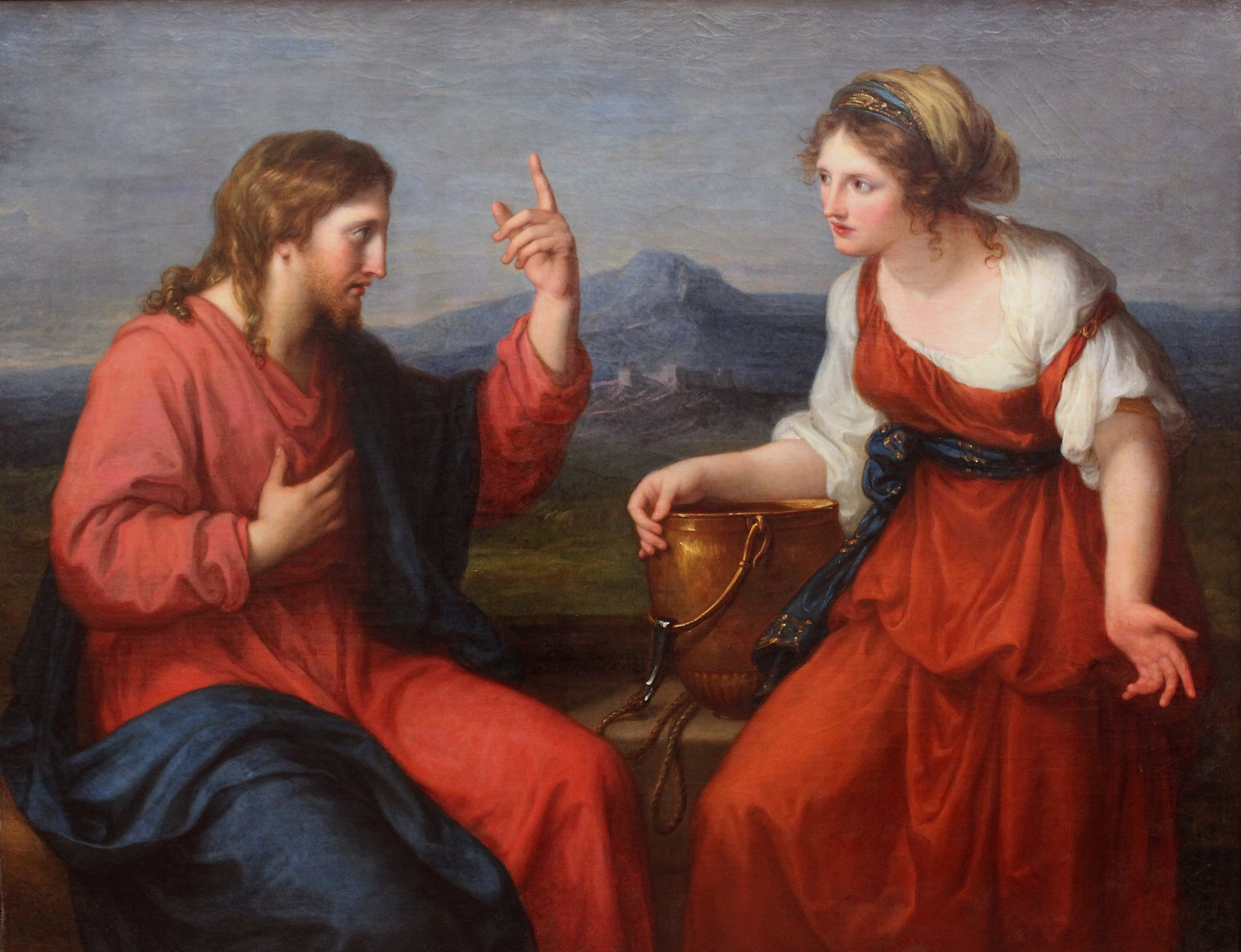
Christ and the Samaritan Woman at the Well by Angelica Kauffman, 1796.

While Jesus is waiting for his disciples to return, a Samaritan woman comes to the well and Jesus asks her for a drink. The obvious object of the request is for physical refreshment after the journey, although Neo-Lutheran theologian Ernst Wilhelm Hengstenberg suggests a spiritual interpretation, "Give me spiritual refreshment (by thy conversion)". The woman is surprised that Jesus asks her for a drink and the narrator comments that Samaritans and Jews do not associate. Jesus responds that if she really knew who he was, she would have asked and he would have given her "living water". "Everyone who drinks this water will be thirsty again, but whoever drinks the water I give him will never thirst. Indeed, the water I give him will become in him a spring of water welling up to eternal life." The woman asks for this "water" and Jesus tells her to go and find her husband and bring him back. The woman states she has no husband, and Jesus says that in fact she has had five husbands and is now living with a man who is not her husband. She then perceives that he is a prophet and raises the question of worship. Jesus then teaches her about worshipping God, how it has been done in the past, at certain locations, and how it will be done properly in the future. "Yet a time is coming and has now come when the true worshippers will worship the Father in spirit and truth, for they are the kind of worshippers the Father seeks. God is spirit, and his worshippers must worship in spirit and in truth." The woman then says that the messiah will come and explain all. Jesus declares that he is the messiah: "I who speak to you am He." (John 4:26).

The editors of the Jerusalem Bible link her five husbands with the five groups of settlers who were brought into Samaria by Shalmaneser V, the king of Assyria who occupied Samaria according to the narrative in 2 Kings 17: they came from Babylon, Cuthah, Ava, Hamath, and Sepharvaim and replaced the people of the northern Kingdom of Israel who were taken into exile.

Several commentators have noted the openness of Jesus' self-revelation to the Samaritan woman, in contrast to his more reserved communication with the Jews: to the Jews "the Messiah was a conquering king, who would help them to ride on the necks of their enemies, and pay back their persecutions and oppressions" and therefore Jesus' claim to be the Messiah necessarily risked a political interpretation: in John 6:15 "when Jesus perceived that they were about to come and take Him by force to make Him king, He departed again to the mountain by Himself alone". But "to this Samaritan woman - speaking, I suppose, the conceptions of her race - the Messiah was One who was to "tell us all things" about the worship of God.

== Evangelization of the Samaritans (verses 27–42) ==
Jesus' disciples return to meet him at the well, and the woman sets off in haste to the town, leaving her waterpot behind. She tells people that Jesus knew all about her, and wonders if he is the Messiah. The people decide to go and see for themselves. The disciples, meanwhile, try to give Jesus some food but he refuses, saying that his food "... is to do the will of HIM who sent me and to finish his work" (John 4:34).

Jesus comments on two sayings which would have been well known to his hearers: "There are still four months and then comes the harvest" (John 4:35) and "One sows and another reaps" (John 4:37). Many of the Samaritan people from town come and Jesus talks with them and they persuade him to stay for two days, teaching them. His words convince them that he is "the Messiah, the Savior of the world". Lutheran theologian Hermann Olshausen described this incident as "further remarkable, as a rare instance of the Lord's ministry producing an awakening on a large scale".

The writer of the Acts of the Apostles noted that the commission given by Jesus to the apostles included preaching the gospel in Samaria (Acts 1:8) and Philip the Evangelist is seen preaching the Christ (or Messiah) in that region (Acts 8:5). The narrative in Acts continues, saying that "when the apostles who were at Jerusalem heard that Samaria had received the word of God, they sent Peter and John to them, who, when they had come down, prayed for them that they might receive the Holy Spirit" (Acts 8:14–15).

== Jesus returns to Galilee (verses 43–45) ==
After the two days, when Jesus stays in Sychar "in compliance with [the Samaritans'] invitation", he then travels back to Galilee, resuming the journey commenced in verse 3. There the people "welcome" or "receive" him (Greek: ἐδέξαντο) with "open arms". John 4:46 notes that many Galileans had also recently been to Jerusalem for the Passover and had seen the signs which Jesus performed there.

== The royal official's son (verses 46–54) ==
In Galilee, Jesus returns to Cana, where a certain nobleman or royal official (Greek: τις βασιλικὸς, tis basilikos) from Capernaum, 38 kilometres (24 mi) away, asks him to heal his sick son. The King James Version describes the man as a "nobleman"; the Geneva Bible has "a certain ruler" and refers to Herod's court; the New Century Version has "one of the king's important officers"; and the Aramaic Bible in Plain English has "a servant of a certain King". Alfred Plummer, in the Cambridge Bible for Schools and Colleges, rejects the term "nobleman" as "inaccurate - the word has nothing to do with birth". Chuza, King Herod's steward (whose wife was Joanna, one of Jesus' disciples mentioned in Luke 8:3 and 24:10) and Manaen (a teacher and prophet in Antioch, mentioned in Acts 13:1, who had been brought up with Herod the Tetrarch) have both been identified as possibly being referred to in this section.

=== Verse 48 ===
Jesus therefore said to him, "Unless you see signs and wonders you will not believe".

Jesus seems annoyed because people only seem to believe in him if he performs miracles (Greek: σημεῖα καὶ τέρατα, sēmeia kai terata, "signs and wonders"). Plummer notes the contrast with "the ready belief of the Samaritans". Nevertheless, Jesus says the boy will be healed. The official goes back home to find his boy well again.

=== Verse 49 ===
The official said to him, "Sir, come down before my child dies".

"Down", because Capernaum was located "down on the northwest shore of the Sea of Galilee".

=== Verse 54 ===
According to John's own comment concluding this narrative, this is Jesus' second sign or miracle (after the Marriage in Cana):

This again is the second sign Jesus did when He had come out of Judea into Galilee.

Plummer prefers the wording "This again, as a second miracle (or sign) ..." Bengel compares three signs seen in Galilee (the feeding of the 5,000 in chapter 6 being the third) with three seen in Judea, the first at the feast of Pentecost, on the impotent man at Bethesda, chapter 5; the second, after the feast of tabernacles, healing the blind man, chapter 9; the third, on the dead man Lazarus, before the Passover, in chapter 11. Henry Alford suggests that the sign at the wedding in Cana brought about the faith of his disciples, "his own", whereas this healing brought about a faith outside that circle.

Preceded by John 3	Chapters of the Bible; Gospel of John	Succeeded by John 5

Samaritan Woman at the Well Life of Jesus: Ministry
Preceded by Jesus meets with Nicodemus	New Testament; Events	Succeeded by Hometown Rejection of Jesus, "Physician, heal thyself"
