= Papyrus 28 =

Papyrus $\mathfrak{P}^{28}$
- New Testament manuscript
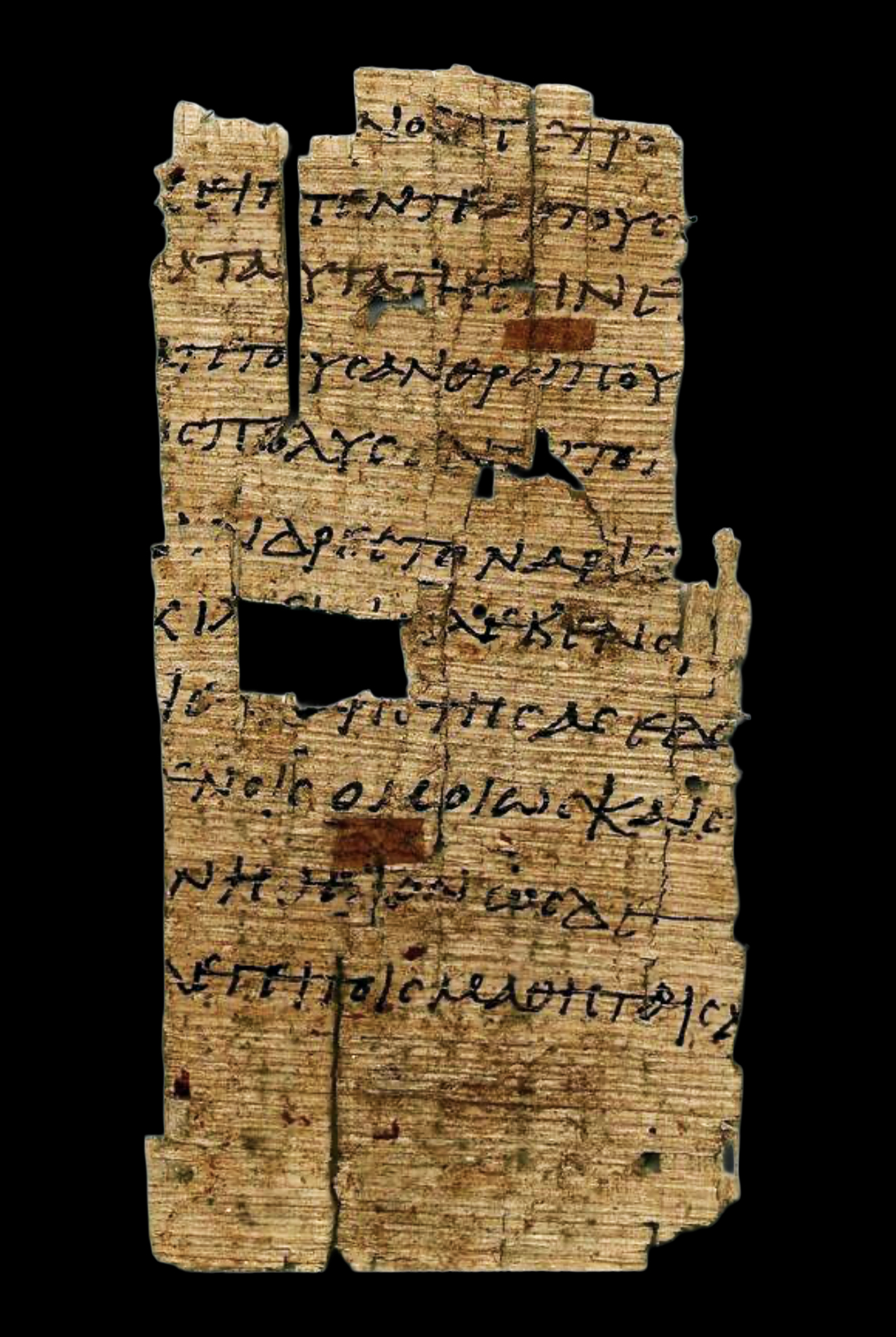
- Verso John 6:8-12
- Name: P. Oxy. 1596
- Text: John 6 †
- Date: 3rd century
- Script: Greek
- Found: Oxyrhynchus, Egypt
- Now at: Collection of Gifford Combs
- Cite: B. P. Grenfell & A. S. Hunt, Oxyrynchus Papyri XIII, (London 1919), pp. 8-10
- Size: 10 cm by 5 cm
- Type: Alexandrian text-type
- Category: I
- Hand: semi-uncial
- Note: close to א

Papyrus 28 (in the Gregory-Aland numbering), designated by 𝔓^{28}, is an early copy of the New Testament in Greek. It is a papyrus manuscript of the Gospel of John, it contains only one leaf with the text of the Gospel of John 6:8-12.17-22. The manuscript paleographically has been assigned to the late 3rd century.

== Description ==
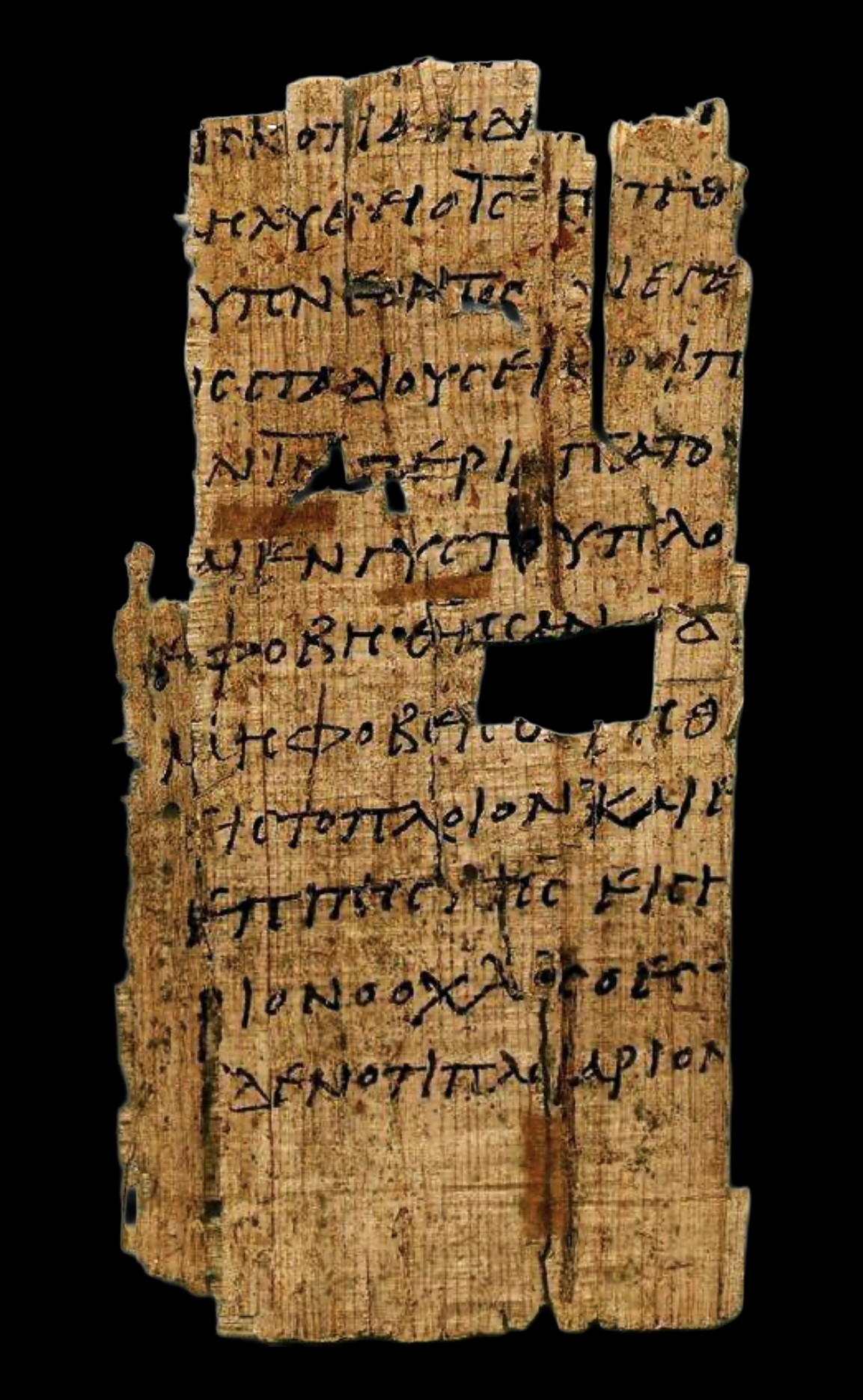
Recto John 6:17-22

The text is written in medium-sized semi-uncial. It is a single leaf, written in 12 lines per page (originally 25 lines). It uses the nomina sacra, but incomplete. The handwriting is quite similar to P. Oxy. 1358. Originally it had 13 cm by 20 cm. Text is written in 25 lines per page.

== Text ==
The Greek text of this codex is a representative of the Alexandrian text-type (rather proto-Alexandrian). Aland placed it in Category I. According to Aland it represents a "normal text". This manuscript displays a closest agreement with 𝔓^{75} (in 7 out of 10 variants). According to Grenfell and Hunt it is closer to Vaticanus than to Sinaiticus. Only in one case it supports Codex Alexandrinus against Sinaiticus and Vaticanus (John 6:11). Grenfell and Hunt noted that text is not "very correctly spelled". It has five unique readings. In John 6:10 it has πεντακισ]χιλειοι, ελεβεν instead of ελαβεν, in 6:19 ενγυς instead of εγγυς, in 6:20 φοβεισθαι instead of φοβεισθε, in 6:22 ιδεν instead of ειδεν.

== History ==
The manuscript was found together with 3rd-4th century documents.

It was housed at the Pacific School of Religion (Pap. 2) in Berkeley, California until it was sold in 2015 to a private collector, Gifford Combs, and is now housed in Los Angeles (Collection of Gifford Combs).

== See also ==
- John 6
- List of New Testament papyri
