= John 8 =

- ← chapter 7 chapter 9 →
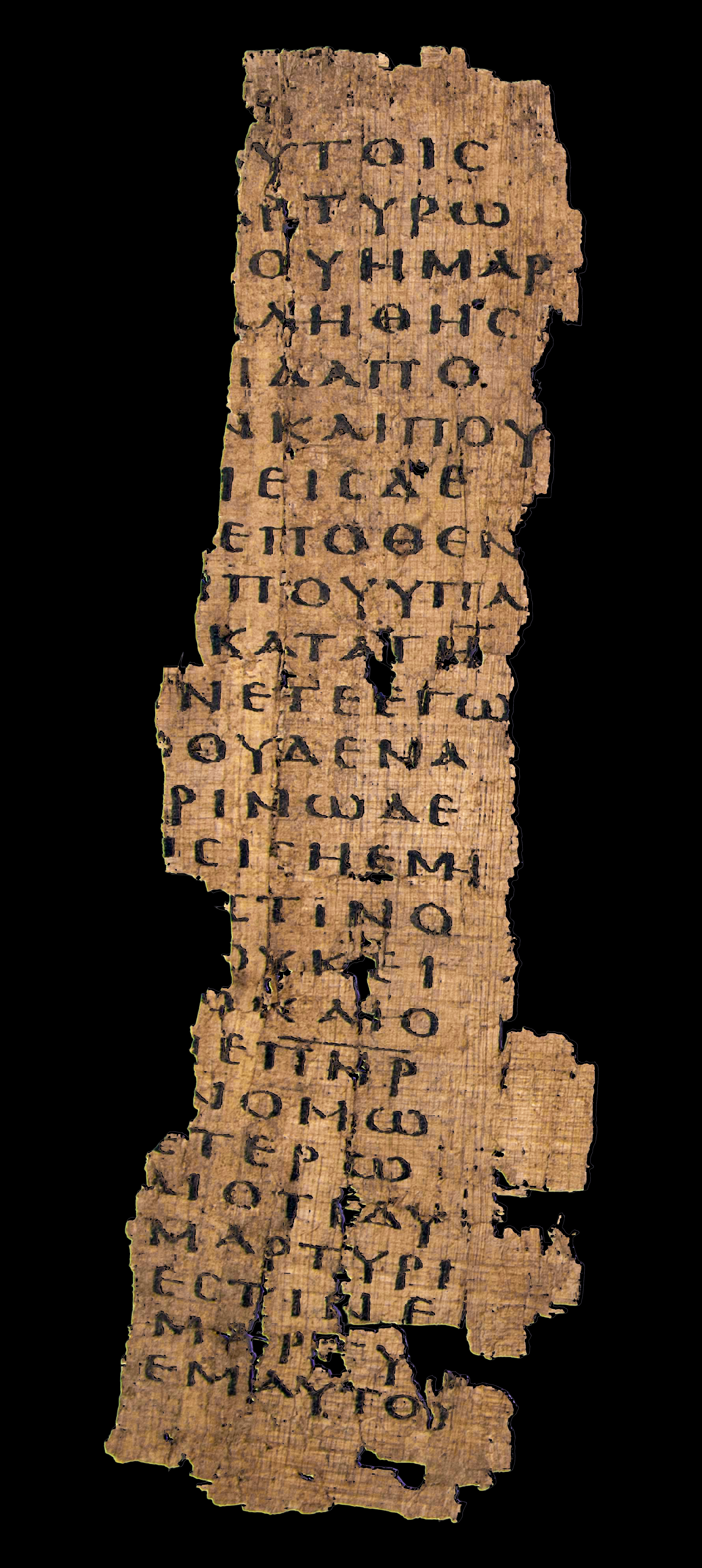
- John 8:14–18 on Papyrus 39 from the 3rd century
- Book: Gospel of John
- Category: Gospel
- Christian Bible part: New Testament
- Order in the Christian part: 4

John 8 is the eighth chapter in the Gospel of John in the New Testament of the Christian Bible. It continues the account of Jesus' debate with the Pharisees after the Feast of Tabernacles, which began in the previous chapter.

Verses 1-11, along with John 7:53, form a pericope which is missing from some ancient Greek manuscripts. In verse 12, Jesus describes himself as "the light of the world" and verse 32 contains the well-known teaching "ye shall know the truth, and the truth shall make you free". In verses 56–58, Jesus claims to have existed before Abraham: "Verily, verily, I say unto you, Before Abraham was, I am."

== Text ==
The original text was written in Koine Greek. This chapter is divided into 59 verses. Some early manuscripts containing the text of this chapter (but see below regarding verses 1-11) are:

- Papyrus 75 (AD 175–225)
- Papyrus 66 (c. 200)
- Codex Vaticanus (325–350)
- Codex Sinaiticus (330–360)
- Codex Bezae (c. 400)
- Codex Alexandrinus (400–440)
- Codex Ephraemi Rescriptus (c. 450; extant verses 35–59)

=== Old Testament references ===
- John 8:5: Leviticus 20:10
- John 8:7: Deuteronomy 17:7
- John 8:17: Deuteronomy 17:6

== Pericope adulterae (verses 1–11) ==
The first eleven verses in chapter 8 are usually grouped with a previous verse, John 7:53, to form a passage known as "Pericope adulterae" or "Pericope de Adultera". It is considered canonical, but not found in some ancient Greek manuscripts of the New Testament (such as P^{66}, P^{75}, Codex Sinaiticus, Codex Vaticanus) and some old translations. Most manuscripts that contain the text place it after John 7:52, probably because of the words 'neither do I condemn you' in 8:11, which are comparable to John 8:15. Some manuscripts place it after John 7:36, John 7:44, or John 21:25, whereas a group of manuscripts known as the "Ferrar group" place it after Luke 21:38.

The style of the story may be compared with Luke 7:36–50, and could be called a 'biographical apophthegm', in which a saying of Jesus may have been developed into the story of a woman caught in adultery. Here, as in the Synoptic Gospels, Jesus does not reject the law directly but criticizes those who 'apply it mechanically', for the law should be interpreted 'in the light of God's mercy for sinners'.

=== Narrative ===
At the end of the Feast of Tabernacles, Jesus goes overnight to the Mount of Olives (John 8:1), "lodging probably in the house of Lazarus", according to the Expositor's Greek Testament, whilst everyone else "goes home" (John 7:53). This is the only mention of the Mount of Olives in John's Gospel, although the area is also referred to in John 18:1, "Jesus crossed the Kidron Valley with his disciples and entered a grove of olive trees".

=== Verse 1 ===
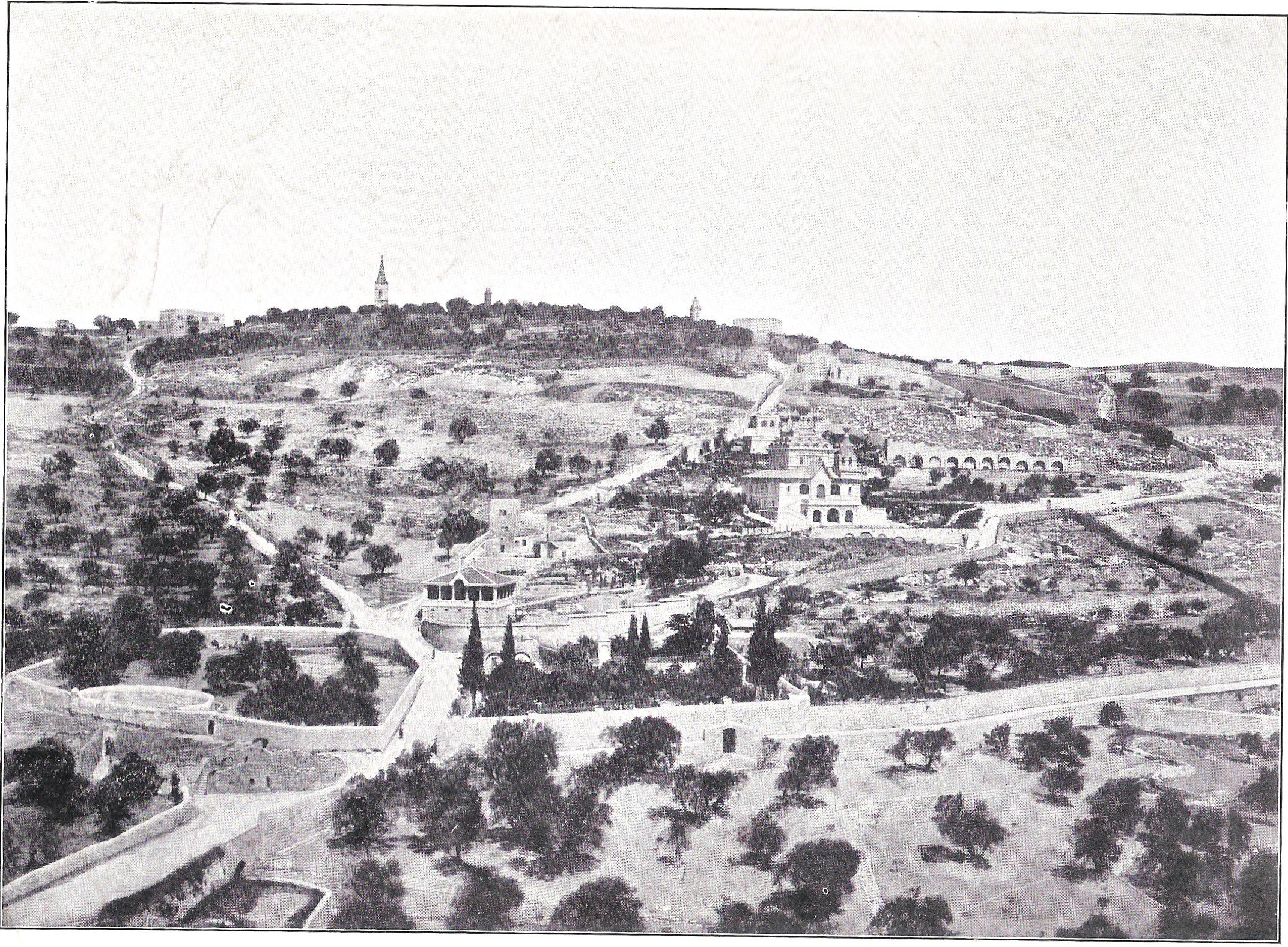
Mount of Olives, viewed eastward from Jerusalem (c. 1899)

But Jesus went to the Mount of Olives.

The Mount of Olives is a hill running north to south about three kilometres (two miles) long, directly east of Jerusalem across the Kidron Valley; named for the large number of olive trees that grew on it. Luke 21 records a summary of Jesus' practice when he ministered in Jerusalem prior to his passion:

^{37} And every day he was teaching in the temple, but at night he went out and lodged on the mount called Olivet. ^{38} And early in the morning all the people came to him in the temple to hear him.

Similarly, in verse 2 here, Jesus returns to the Temple early the next morning.

=== Verse 7 ===
So when they continued asking Him, He raised Himself up and said to them,

"He who is without sin among you, let him throw a stone at her first."

- "He raised Himself up": or "He looked up"
- "Let him thrown a stone at her first" (KJV: "let him first cast a stone at her"): that is, as a witness to the sinful deed, one can first cast a stone at the guilty party, according to the law in Deuteronomy 17:7 which commands that "the hands of the witnesses shall be first upon him to put him to death, and afterward the hands of all the people".

=== Verse 11 ===
^{a}She said, "No one, Lord."
^{b}And Jesus said to her, "Neither do I condemn you; go and sin no more."

- "Go and": after these words, NU and M (Note: NU: 'the 27th edition of the Nestle-Aland Greek New Testament' and 'the 4th edition United Bible Societies'; M: 'the Greek New Testament According to the Majority Text'.) versions have "from now on".

=== Authenticity ===
There is dispute over the authenticity of the passage, although many scholars conclude that it does record an actual event. It appears in the King James Version but modern English translations note that it is not present in the 'most reliable early manuscripts' of John, and therefore suggest that it is unlikely to have been part of the original text. H. W. Watkins notes that the Jewish "scribes" (verse 3) are not referred to elsewhere in this Gospel. Until the 20th century, it was not thought that any Greek Church Father had taken note of the passage before the 12th century; but in 1941 a large collection of the writings of Didymus the Blind (ca. 313–398) was discovered in Egypt, including a reference to the pericope adulterae (in Didymus' commentary on Ecclesiastes: 7:21–22) as being found in "several copies", and it is now considered established that this passage was present in its usual place in some Greek manuscripts known in Alexandria and elsewhere from the 4th century onwards. In support of this it is noted that the 4th-century Codex Vaticanus, which was written in Egypt, marks the end of John chapter 7 with a distigme (a symbol formerly called umlaut on account of its shape), indicating that an alternative reading was known at this point.

Jerome reports that the pericope adulterae was to be found in its usual place in "many Greek and Latin manuscripts" in Rome and the Latin West in the late 4th century. This is confirmed by some Latin Fathers of the 4th and 5th centuries CE, including Ambrose and Augustine. The latter claimed that the passage may have been improperly excluded from some manuscripts in order to avoid the impression that Christ had sanctioned adultery:

Certain persons of little faith, or rather enemies of the true faith, fearing, I suppose, lest their wives should be given impunity in sinning, removed from their manuscripts the Lord's act of forgiveness toward the adulteress, as if he who had said, Sin no more, had granted permission to sin.

Papias (circa AD 125) refers to a story of Jesus and a woman "accused of many sins" as being found in the Gospel of the Hebrews, which may refer to this passage (as cited in Eusebius, H.E 3.39.17). There is a very certain quotation of the pericope adulterae in the 3rd-century Syriac Didascalia Apostolorum 8.2, though without indicating John's Gospel. The Constitutions of the Holy Apostles Book II.24 refers to the passage "And when the elders had set another woman who had sinned before Him, and had left the sentence to Him, and were gone out, our Lord, the Searcher of the hearts, inquiring of her whether the elders had condemned her, and being answered No, He said unto her: 'Go thy way therefore, for neither do I condemn thee.'" Book II is generally dated to the late third century (Von Drey, Krabbe, Bunsen, Funk). Codex Fuldensis, which is positively dated to AD 546 contains the adulterae pericope. The Second Epistle of Pope Callistus section 6 contains a quote that may be from John 8:11: "Let him see to it that he sin no more, that the sentence of the Gospel may abide in him: 'Go, and sin no more.'" However the epistle quotes from eighth-century writings and is not thought to be genuine.

Almost all modern translations now include the Pericope de Adultera at John 7:53-8:11, but some enclose it in brackets or add a note concerning the oldest and most reliable witnesses. Commentators like René Kieffer discuss its contents separately from their consideration of the rest of this chapter.

== Jesus the Light of the World (verses 12–30) ==
=== Verse 12 ===
Then Jesus spoke to them again, saying,:

"I am the light of the world.

He who follows Me shall not walk in darkness, but have the light of life."

Jesus describes himself as "the Light of the World", revisiting a theme of the Prologue to the Gospel:

The light shines in the darkness, and the darkness did not comprehend it. (John 1:5 NKJV)

Jesus' statement is discontinuous both with the narrative of John 7:53–8:11, everyone but the woman having left the Temple convicted by their own consciences, and with the preceding verse, John 7:52, where Nicodemus the Pharisee had been urged by the other members of the Sanhedrin to re-examine the scriptures on the issue of whether a prophet could come from Galilee. Theologian Heinrich Meyer attempts to find a connection:

We must look for some connection with John 7:52. This may be found simply as follows. As the Sanhedrim [sic] had not been able to carry out their design of apprehending Jesus, and had, moreover, become divided among themselves (as is recorded in John 7:45–52), He was able, in consequence of this miscarriage in their plans against Him (Greek: οὖν), to come forth afresh and address the assembled people in the temple.

Some writers have pointed out that Jesus's likening himself to light in this verse and his likening himself to water in 7:37-39 seem to be a reference to water and light rituals on the last day of the Feast of Booths or Sukkot, the setting of these chapters (7:2, 37).

=== Verse 13 ===
The Pharisees therefore said to Him, "You bear witness of Yourself; Your witness is not true".

The Pharisees complain that Jesus bears witness to himself, an issue also addressed in the Prologue:

John the Baptist came for a witness, to bear witness of the Light, that all through him might believe. He was not that Light, but was sent to bear witness of that Light. That was the true Light which gives light to every man coming into the world. (John 1:7-8: NKJV)

The assertion being made is not that Jesus' statement is untrue, but that it is not valid as testimony, insufficient, or "cannot be verified". In the same way, Jesus has already said at John 5:31, "If I bear witness of Myself, My witness is not true".

=== Verse 14 ===
Jesus answered and said to them, "Even if I bear witness of Myself, My witness is true, for I know where I came from and where I am going; but you do not know where I come from and where I am going".

Greek: ἐγὼ μαρτυρῶ περὶ ἐμαυτοῦ, (egō marturō peri emautou): the expressed ἐγώ indicates that Jesus is an exception to the rule, the reason being that "He knows whence He comes and whither He goes ... He knows His origin and His destiny. He knows Himself, and therefore the rule mentioned has no application to Him."

=== Verse 15 ===
You judge according to the flesh; I judge no one.

Various commentators allow qualifications to the words "I judge no one", for example George Leo Haydock reads the words as "I judge no one in this manner", contrasting with the Pharisees' mode of judgment, while Joseph Benson adds "Not thus; not now; not at my first coming".

== Jesus' dialogue with the Jews who had believed in Him (verses 31–59) ==
After stating that many of Jesus' hearers believed in him (John 8:30), the narrative moves Jesus' dialogue from the Pharisees to the Jews who had believed in him (Greek: τους πεπιστευκοτας αυτω ιουδαιους; verse 31). Many English translations have "Jews who believed in Him". Watkins identifies a contrast and "perhaps, something of wonder", in the idea that there were Jews who were believers. The tone of verses 31 to 59 is critical and argumentative with this group; the Pulpit Commentary finds them to be believers of "the most imperfect kind", who "accepted the Messianic claims [of Jesus], but persisted in interpreting them, not by his word, but by their own ideas of the theocratic kingdom, by their privileges as children of Abraham, by their national animosity to their nearest neighbours the Samaritans, by their inability to press behind the veil of his humanity to his Divine nature".

American theologian J. Louis Martyn suggested that John's Gospel could be read on two levels, portraying events and contesting controversies in the early church through a narrative portraying the life and teaching of Jesus. Such a reading suggests a controversy regarding Jewish partial-believers in Jesus as the Messiah who, according to the evangelist, did not accept the whole "truth" of orthodox Christian teaching and maintained that their covenantal relationship with God was rooted in the Abrahamic tradition rather than the salvation (freedom) offered by Jesus. For this group of Jews, the fundamental credal proposition was that "Abraham is our father" (first arm of John 8:39). The evangelist's response is to acknowledge that they are indeed the descendants of Abraham (John 8:37 and second arm of John 8:39), but to explore the behavior which should follow: "If you were Abraham's children, you would do the works of Abraham." Instead, "you seek to kill Me, a Man who has told you the truth which I heard from God" (John 8:40). The Pulpit Commentary notes this phrase as "the only place [in the gospels] where the Lord speaks of himself as 'a man'", although the threat to kill "a man" can also be read as indicating that the Jews threatened to kill those proclaiming the message which the evangelist identifies as the true gospel (John 8:32).

In John 8:44, Jesus denounces other Jews in harsh terms, "You are of your father the devil, and the desires of your father you want to do." Historian Paula Fredriksen presents this verse as an example of intra-Jewish polemic within the Gospel of John, placing it alongside other instances of fierce internal Jewish argument found across the New Testament. She notes that such heated rhetoric between Jewish groups was not unusual in the period. She adds that in later periods, Gentile Christians mistakenly read this rhetoric not as arguments within the Jewish community, but as anti-Jewish statements.

In John 8:48, Jesus is accused of being a Samaritan and being demon-possessed. He denies having a demon, but makes no comment on the Samaritan accusation. The controversy portrayed as Jesus arguing with "the Jews who had believed in Him" continues through to verse 59. Jesus states that the current times fulfil Abraham's hopes and that Abraham saw this time and "was glad" (John 8:56). The Jews' response is that Jesus is not yet fifty years old, i.e. has not yet reached the age of "full manhood" as indicated in Numbers 4:3, 4:39 and 8:24. The evangelist brings the chapter to its climax with Jesus' words, "before Abraham was, I AM" (John 8:58), words which inevitably are interpreted as Jesus "[taking] to Himself the Divine Name" and so they "prepare to stone Him for blasphemy". According to non-Trinitarian interpretations, the words concerned with Jesus' pre-existence are treated as referring to his being foreordained.

The evangelist ends the narrative with a verse in which Jesus evades their violent response and leaves the Temple. Some manuscripts add Jesus "going through the midst of them, and so passed by". Alfred Plummer, in the Cambridge Bible for Schools and Colleges, states that "these words are apparently an insertion, and probably an adaptation of Luke 4:30. No English Version previous to the one of 1611 contains the passage".

== See also ==
- Abraham
- Light of the World
- Veritas vos liberabit
- Related Bible parts: Ezekiel 33, Matthew 3

== Sources ==
- Kieffer, René (2007). "60. John". In Barton, John; Muddiman, John (eds.). The Oxford Bible Commentary (first (paperback) ed.). Oxford University Press. pp. 960–1000. ISBN 978-0199277186.

| Preceded by John 7 | Chapters of the Bible; Gospel of John | Succeeded by John 9 |
