= John 3 =

- ← chapter 2 chapter 4 →
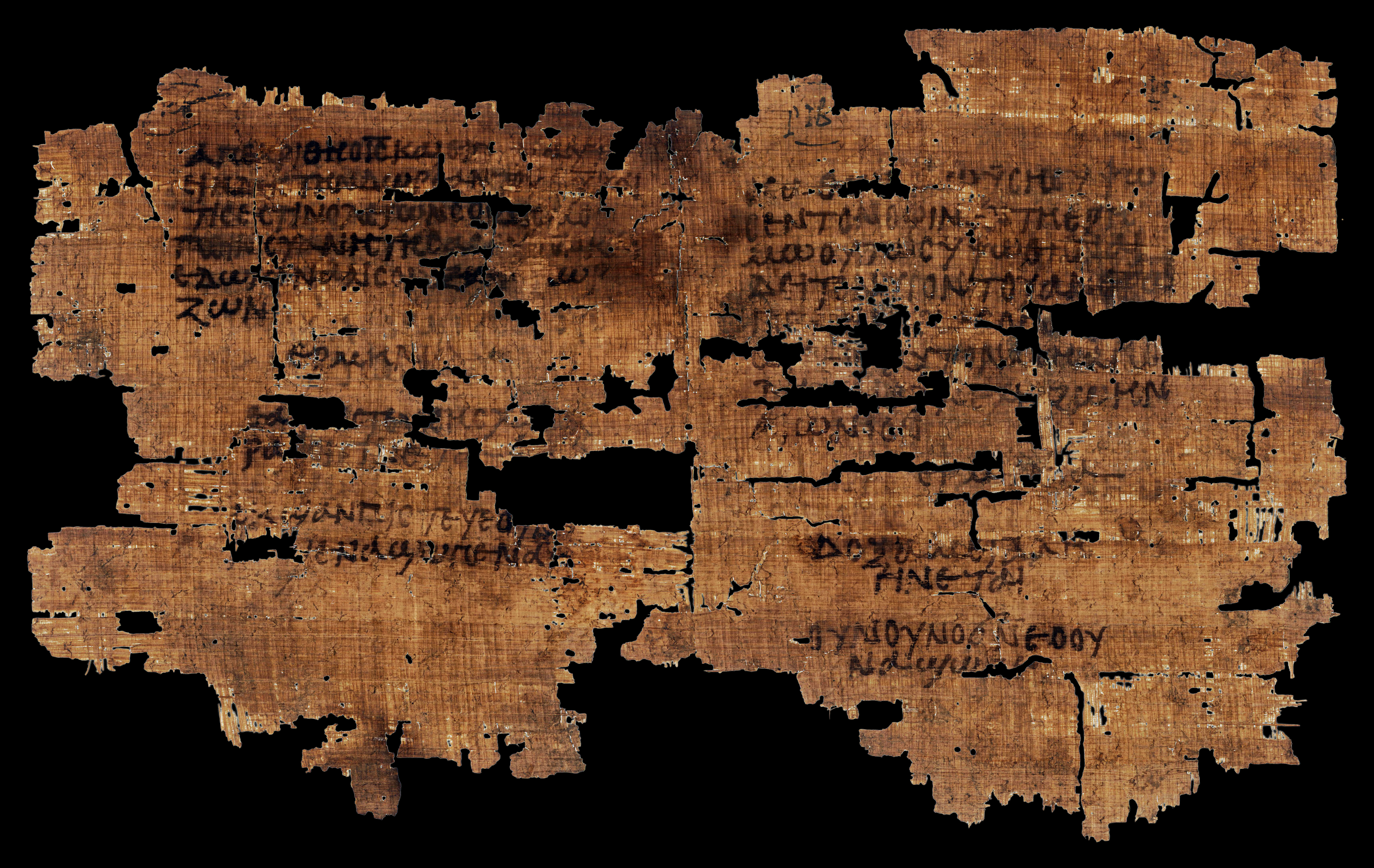
- John 3:14–18 on the verso side in Papyrus 63, c. AD 500
- Book: Gospel of John
- Category: Gospel
- Christian Bible part: New Testament
- Order in the Christian part: 4

John 3 is the third chapter of the Gospel of John in the New Testament of the Christian Bible. It deals with Jesus' conversation with Nicodemus, one of the Jewish pharisees, and John the Baptist's continued testimony regarding Jesus. Baptist preacher Charles Spurgeon said of this chapter that it is the one he would choose "to read to a dying man who did not know the gospel, [as] the most suitable one for such an occasion".

== Text ==
The original text was written in Koine Greek. This chapter is divided into 36 verses. Some early manuscripts containing the text of this chapter are:

- Papyrus 75 (AD 175–225)
- Papyrus 66 (c. 200)
- Codex Vaticanus (325–350)
- Codex Sinaiticus (330–360)
- Codex Bezae (c. 400; extant verses 27–36)
- Codex Alexandrinus (400–440)
- Codex Ephraemi Rescriptus (c. 450; extant verses 34–36)
- Papyrus 63 (c. 500; extant verses 14–18).

== Discourse with Nicodemus (verses 1–21) ==
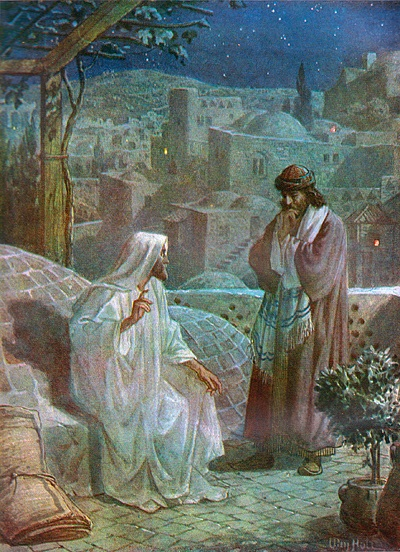
Jesus talking to Nicodemus, depicted by William Hole

The first part of the chapter begins with Nicodemus, said to be a member of the ruling council, coming at night to talk with Jesus, whom he calls Rabbi. Nicodemus appears here and in John 7, and he is listed in John 19:39, and only in the Gospel of John, as helping Joseph of Arimathea to bury Jesus.

On account of Jesus' "miraculous signs", Nicodemus and others ("we" in John 3:2) have recognized that Jesus is "a teacher come from God". The reference to "signs" picks up a theme established in chapter 2. It is not clear for whom Nicodemus speaks – the translation in The Voice adds wording, "Teacher, some of us have been talking ..." – but many commentators infer from the nighttime setting for this meeting that Nicodemus came alone, privately, "through shame, and fear of his brethren of the council", shame possibly arising because, "being a master in Israel, [he would not want] to be looked upon as a scholar going to learn of another". Methodist writer Joseph Benson notes, with support, theologian Daniel Whitby's interpretation, that "the Pharisees and rulers knew Christ to be a teacher come from God".

=== Verses 3-4 ===
In reply, Jesus declares, "I tell you the truth, no one can see the kingdom of God unless he is born from above", alternatively, "unless he is born again." The word in Greek: ἄνωθεν, may be translated as either "again" or "from above". The King James Version, the English Standard Version and the New International Version all say "born again", whereas the New Revised Standard Version and Young's Literal Translation both have "born from above" in their text with an alternative note "born anew". The translators of the English Standard Version argue that "the Greek is purposely ambiguous".

Nicodemus's reply, "How can someone be born when they are old? Surely they cannot enter a second time into their mother's womb to be born!" reflects an understanding that Jesus is speaking of a second birth.

=== Verse 5 ===
Jesus answered, Verily, verily, I say unto thee, Except a man be born of water and of the Spirit, he cannot enter into the kingdom of God.

Spurgeon speaks of the expression "Verily, verily" as "the peculiar idiom of our Lord Jesus Christ". The Greek wording is αμην αμην, amēn, amēn. Jesus talks of what it means to be born again and the path to heaven. "I tell you the truth, no one can enter the kingdom of God unless he is born of water and the Spirit. Flesh gives birth to flesh, but the Spirit gives birth to spirit."

=== Verse 7 ===
Marvel not that I said unto thee, Ye must be born again.

Theologian Donald Guthrie states that this verse gives emphasis to "the imperative character of the new birth", with "nothing optional about it'".

=== Verse 13 ===
"No one has ascended into heaven except he who descended from heaven, the Son of Man."

This verse addresses a question posed by Agur, the collector and compiler of a group of proverbs found in Proverbs 30. After the collections of proverbs shown to the readers, Agur reflects on his limitations, declaring himself weary and "too stupid to be human" (Proverbs 30:2). Proverbs 30:4 specifically asks, "Who has ascended to heaven and come down?" This rhetorical question emphasizes the limitations of human wisdom in contrast to divine wisdom, showing the surpassing wisdom of the Son of God making the universe "who hath gathered the wind in his fists? who hath bound the waters in a garment? who hath established all the ends of the earth? what is his name, and what is his son's name, if thou canst tell?"

John 3:13 can be seen as a direct answer to Proverbs 30:4, with Jesus asserting His unique authority and divine origin, bridging the gap between human and divine wisdom. The context of this dialogue with Nicodemus, a wise Pharisee, underscores the transition from human wisdom to divine revelation, moving from the title "Son of Man" to "Son of God". This linkage not only connects two significant figures in biblical text but also frames the discussion within the larger narrative of Jesus's teachings and the fulfillment of scriptural wisdom.

=== Verse 14 ===
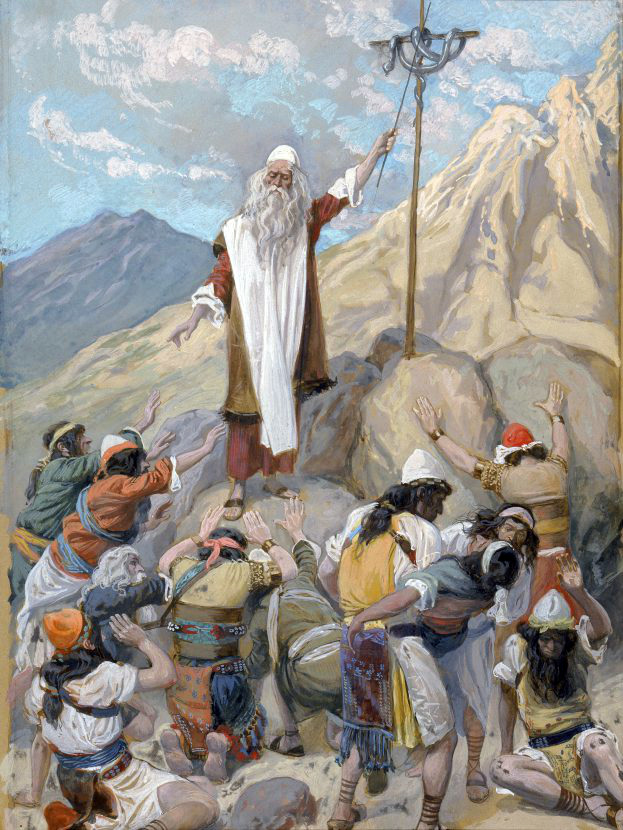
Moses lifted up the "Brazen Serpent" (watercolor c. 1896–1902 by James Tissot).

And as Moses lifted up the serpent in the wilderness, even so must the Son of man be lifted up:

This verse alludes to Numbers 21:5–9 (see also Nehushtan).

- "Be lifted up" (especially in the Gospel of John) refers to 'one continuous action of ascent, beginning with the cross but ending at the right hand of the Father', in three steps: (1) Jesus' death on the cross, (2) his resurrection, and (3) his ascension back to heaven (cf. Philippians 2:5–11; John 1:51; 12:32).

=== Verse 15 ===
that whoever believes in him may have eternal life.

Belief in the Son of Man results in eternal life. This will be followed by a statement that belief in the Son of God results in eternal life. Jesus identifies Himself using both the 'Son of Man' and the 'Son of God,' assuming both titles as part of His mission to save the world. However, the comprehension of these titles by Nicodemus and other contemporaries might not have been immediate or straightforward, prompting them to think more deeply.

Ironically, in Matthew's Gospel, during Jesus' trial, he does more openly and explicitly identify himself with both of these titles, which ultimately leads to His conviction and crucifixion."

=== Verse 16 ===
For God so loved the world, that he gave his only begotten Son, that whosoever believeth in him should not perish, but have everlasting life.

This chapter is intended to show the importance of the belief in Jesus as the son of God. Jesus is shown here already proclaiming himself the Messiah and laying out aspects of Christian theology, in contrast to Mark for instance, where Jesus seems to try to keep the fact of his divinity secret until his final trip to Jerusalem.

Many do not see a "messianic secret" conflict between the synoptics and John. While Jesus does make direct claims about His identity in certain contexts (especially in John), in other situations, He chooses a more figurative or indirect approach to communicate His role and nature. Even in John, Jesus is more openly saying he is Savior of the World to the Samaritans and implicitly at night in private to Nicodemus, less openly in Israel.

John's more often use of Son of God as complementary to the synoptic gospel's more often use of Son of Man. They see use of "Son of God" is integral to demonstrating Jesus's unique relationship with the Father, which is a central theme of the Gospel and not merely a reflective lens but as inherent to Jesus’s identity as understood by John.

=== Verse 17 ===
"Although John 3:16 famously declares that one is saved by believing in the Son, the subsequent verses, particularly John 3:17, delve deeper into the reasons behind this belief, suggesting that it is fundamentally a matter of the heart's affections, loving darkness rather than light. Theologians John Piper and R.C. Sproul emphasize that true belief stems from a heart transformed by God—a heart whose affections are changed from loving darkness to loving light. Piper argues that such a transformation aligns one’s deepest joys with God’s glory, while Sproul discusses the necessity of divine intervention to alter the human preference for darkness due to inherent sinfulness. Both agree that the nature of one’s affections plays a pivotal role in divine judgment and illustrates the central gospel theme of redemption through Christ."

=== Verse 18–21 ===
"John 3:18–21 explores the relationship between human actions and divine revelation. Verse 20 suggests that those engaged in evil avoid the light to prevent their deeds from being exposed. In contrast, verse 21 highlights that those who act righteously are drawn to the light, demonstrating that their actions, whether repentance or good works, are wrought in divine will."

"I could not therefore see thee as thou art, O my God; and so I turned myself to creatures, but found no rest, and with my back to thee, I fell instead upon myself. At last, I turned my face to my own soul and saw that it was thou, enlightening me in the darkness of understanding." — St. Augustine.

== Jesus baptizes (verses 22–24) ==
Following this discussion, Jesus goes with his disciples into the land of Judea, the region round about Jerusalem, presumably towards the River Jordan, although no specific location is mentioned. He remains there and baptizes. John the Baptist is also baptizing people nearby, at Aenon, near Salim, "because water was abundant there", and people continue coming for baptism. The shadow of John's future imprisonment is cast in verse 24, although John's Gospel makes no further reference to his arrest.

== Jesus and John (verses 25-36) ==
John's disciples tell him that Jesus is also baptizing people, more than John it seems (John 3:26: "everybody is going to Him"). John replies that "A man can receive only what is given him from heaven. You yourselves can testify that I said, 'I am not the Christ, but am sent ahead of him'. The bride belongs to the bridegroom. The friend who attends the bridegroom waits and listens for him, and is full of joy when he hears the bridegroom's voice. That joy is mine, and it is now complete. He must become greater; I must become less." He finishes by saying "Whoever believes in the Son has eternal life, but whoever rejects the Son will not see life, for God's wrath remains on him." This passage is meant to show John's acceptance of Jesus's superiority as well as a further emphasis on belief in him as the path to eternal life/heaven. There is an ethnoreligious group still surviving today, the Mandaeans, who claim John as the greatest prophet.

=== Verse 36 ===
He who believes in the Son has everlasting life; and he who does not believe the Son shall not see life, but the wrath of God abides on him.

In the parallel passage containing the preaching of John the Baptist in Matthew's Gospel, condemnation is directed towards the Pharisees and the Sadducees, who are challenged to "bear fruits worthy of repentance".

== Use of verses from John 3 ==
Biblical references for verses John 3:7 and John 3:16 are both used in signage and popular culture to communicate the message of the Christian gospel.

== See also ==
- Fiery flying serpent
- Moses
- Nehushtan
- Related Bible parts: Numbers 21, Hosea 1.

== Sources ==
- Guthrie, Donald (1994). "John". In Carson, D. A.; France, R. T.; Motyer, J. A.; Wenham, G. J. (eds.). New Bible Commentary: 21st Century Edition (4, illustrated, reprint, revised ed.). Inter-Varsity Press. pp. 1021–1065. ISBN 9780851106489.

Preceded by John 2	Chapters of the Bible; Gospel of John	Succeeded by John 4
