= John 1:16 =

- ← 1:15 1:17 →
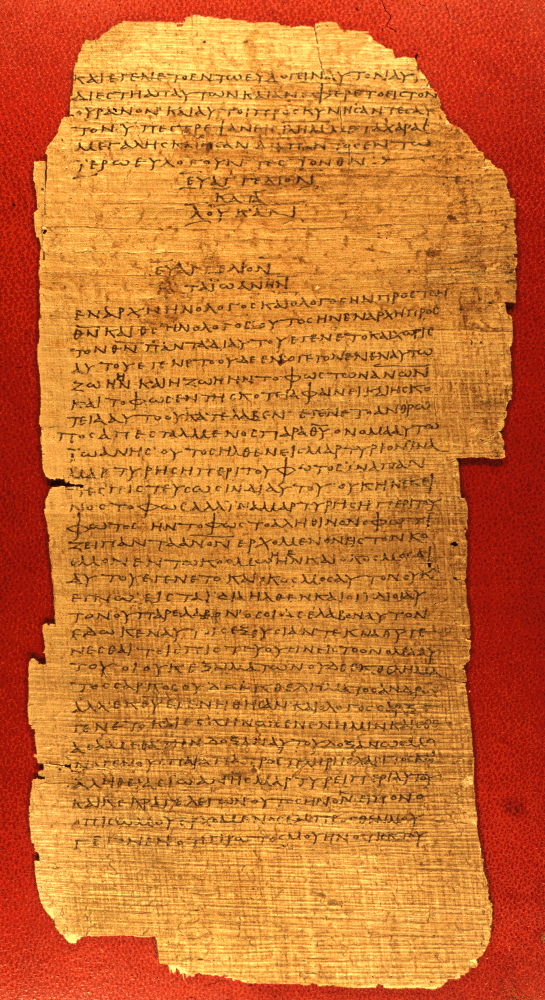
- John 1:1–16 in Papyrus 75 (AD 175–225)
- Book: Gospel of John
- Christian Bible part: New Testament

John 1:16 is the sixteenth verse in the first chapter of the Gospel of John in the New Testament of the Christian Bible.

== Content ==
In the original Greek according to Westcott-Hort, this verse is:

Καὶ ἐκ τοῦ πληρώματος αὐτοῦ ἡμεῖς πάντες ἐλάβομεν, καὶ χάριν ἀντὶ χάριτος.

In the King James Version of the Bible, the text reads:

And of his fulness have all we received, and grace for grace.

The New International Version translates the passage as:

From the fullness of his grace we have all received one blessing after another.

== Analysis ==
=== Fullness (πλήρωμα, plērōma) ===
The "fullness" (πλήρωμα, plērōma) from which believers receive is generally read as picking up the description of the incarnate Word as "full (πλήρης) of grace and truth" in verse 14: it is from that fullness that "we have all received". D. A. Carson states that the term accordingly "bears no technical, gnostic sense" here, and Craig Keener likewise construes the "fullness" of verse 16 as a reference back to the "full of grace and truth" of verse 14, the full measure of grace present in Christ.

=== Relationship between two graces (ἀντὶ, anti) ===
The phrase rendered "grace for grace" (KJV) or "grace upon grace", χάριν ἀντὶ χάριτος (charin anti charitos), turns on the sense of the preposition ἀντί (anti). Carson distinguishes several proposals: that ἀντί means "corresponds to" (one grace answering another); "in return for" (a grace given in exchange, which Carson considers foreign to the New Testament's idea of grace); "in addition to" or "upon", giving the popular renderings "grace upon grace" (John 1:16, RSV) and "one blessing after another" (John 1:16, NIV); and "instead of", the sense Carson notes is the most common for ἀντί in the Septuagint.

Commentators are divided over which sense fits best. Carson favours "instead of", so that "from Christ's fullness we have all received grace instead of grace", one grace displacing an earlier one. Keener says because in the Fourth Gospel Christ fulfils rather than negates Moses, he judges that "accumulation may make more sense than substitution", grace added to grace to express an inexhaustible supply of blessing. Both note that the exact construction remains ambiguous while the general sense, the superabundance of grace received from Christ, is clear.

Two ancient parallels are commonly cited. Keener compares a phrase in Sirach, χάρις ἐπὶ χάριτι ("charm upon charm", "a double grace"), as a similar emphatic expression for an added blessing. Carson examines the parallel most often adduced for the "grace upon grace" reading, in Philo (On the Posterity of Cain 145), and argues that it tells against that reading: Philo speaks of "graces" in the plural and describes God dispensing them in small doses, one kind of grace replacing another, not an accumulation of grace upon grace.

According to Robert Witham, the wording in this verse implies an abundance of graces, and greater graces under the new law of Christ than during the time of the law of Moses, which is confirmed by the next verse. Cornelius à Lapide elaborates on this greater grace, saying "Moses gave only an obscure and slight knowledge of God and the Holy Trinity, but by Christ a knowledge that was clear and full."

=== Reception of grace ===
Keener takes the first-person "we have all received" to refer in the first instance to the eyewitnesses of verse 14, but, through the verb, to extend to all who come to believe on their testimony (John 1:12; John 17:20). He notes that the "all" (πάντες) is nonetheless restricted to those who believe the light, as in John 1:7 and John 1:9, not everyone to whom the light is made available.

== Commentary from the Church Fathers ==
Thomas Aquinas assembled the following quotations regarding this verse from the early Fathers of the Church:

- Origen: "This is to be considered a continuation of the Baptist's testimony to Christ, a point which has escaped the attention of many, who think that from this to, He hath declared Him (verse 18), St. John the Apostle is speaking. But the idea that on a sudden, and, as it would seem, unseasonably, the discourse of the Baptist should be interrupted by a speech of the disciple's, is inadmissible. (Note: Heinrich Meyer identifies Heracleon, Rupertus, Erasmus, Martin Luther, Philip Melancthon and Lange among those who share Origen's interpretation. Meyer sees the words ἡμεῖς πάντες (hēmeis pantes, we ... all) as decisively making the words part of John the evangelist's message.) And any one, able to follow the passage, will discern a very obvious connexion here. For having said, He is preferred before me, for He was before me, he proceeds, From this I know that He is before me, because I and the Prophets who preceded me have received of His fulness, and grace for grace, For they too by the Spirit penetrated beyond the figure to the contemplation of the truth. And hence receiving, as we have done, of his fulness, we judge that the law was given by Moses, but that grace and truth were made, by Jesus Christ—made, not given: the Father gave the law by Moses, but made grace and truth by Jesus. But if it is Jesus who says below, I am the Truth, (John 14:6) how is truth made by Jesus? We must understand however that the very substantial Truth, from which First Truth and Its Image many truths are engraven on those who treat of the truth, was not made through Jesus Christ, or through any one; but only the truth which is in individuals, such as in Paul, e. g. or the other Apostles, was made through Jesus Christ."
- Chrysostom: "Or thus; John the Evangelist here adds his testimony to that of John the Baptist, saying, And of his fulness have we all received. These are not the words of the forerunner, but of the disciple; as if he meant to say, We also the twelve, and the whole body of the faithful, both present and to come, have received of His fulness."
- Augustine: "But what have ye received? Grace for grace. So that we are to understand that we have received a certain something from His fulness, and over and above this, grace for grace; that we have first received of His fulness, first grace; and again, we have received grace for grace. What grace did we first receive? Faith: which is called grace, because it is given freely. This is the first grace then which the sinner receives, the remission of his sins. Again, we have grace for grace; i.e. instead of that grace in which we live by faith, we are to receive another, viz. life eternal: for life eternal is as it were the wages of faith. And thus as faith itself is a good grace, so life eternal is grace for grace. There was not grace in the Old Testament; for the law threatened, but assisted not, commanded, but healed not, showed our weakness, but relieved it not. It prepared the way however for a Physician who was about to come, with the gifts of grace and truth: whence the sentence which follows: For the law was given by Moses, but grace and truth were made by Jesus Christ. The death of thy Lord hath destroyed death, both temporal and eternal; that is the grace which was promised, but not contained, in the law."

== Notes ==
| Preceded by John 1:15 | Gospel of John; Chapter 1 | Succeeded by John 1:17 |
