= John 1:19 =

- ← 1:18 1:20 →
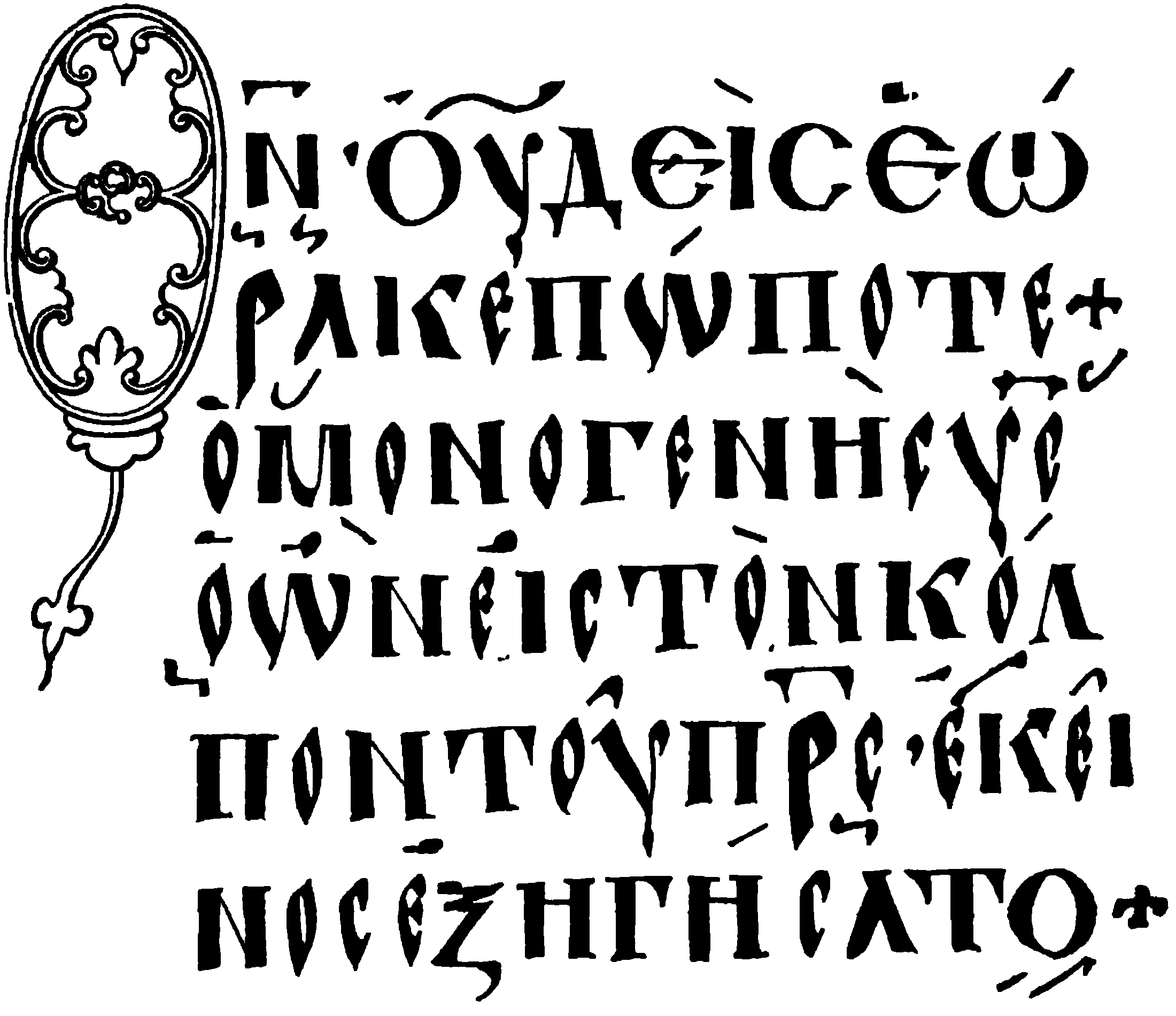
- John 1:18-20 in Codex Harcleianus (Lectionary 150) from 995 AD.
- Book: Gospel of John
- Christian Bible part: New Testament

John 1:19 is the nineteenth verse in the first chapter of the Gospel of John in the New Testament of the Christian Bible.

== Content ==
In the original Greek according to Westcott-Hort this verse is:

Καὶ αὕτη ἐστὶν ἡ μαρτυρία τοῦ Ἰωάννου, ὅτε ἀπέστειλαν οἱ Ἰουδαῖοι ἐξ Ἱεροσολύμων ἱερεῖς καὶ Λευΐτας ἵνα ἐρωτήσωσιν αὐτόν, Σὺ τίς εἶ;

After ἀπέστειλαν, some ancient Greek versions add πρὸς αὐτόν.

In the King James Version of the Bible, the text reads:

And this is the record of John, when the Jews sent priests and Levites from Jerusalem to ask him, Who art thou?

The New International Version translates the passage as:

Now this was John's testimony when the Jews of Jerusalem sent priests and Levites to ask him who he was.

== Analysis ==
Heinrich Meyer notes that John's "historical narrative" begins with this verse.

"And this is the witness of John ...", the same as the testimony of John seen in verse 15. It seems that John the Baptist often bore witness to Jesus, that He was the Messiah, both before and after his baptism.

"The Jews sent ...": According to Catholic writer Robert Witham, these men were priests and Levites who appear to have been sent by the Sanhedrin to enquire of John the Baptist, who was then held in great esteem, to see if he was their Messiah, for it was believed he was to come about that time. Lapide comments that "the reason for this embassy was because the chief priests saw John leading in the desert an angelic life, preaching with great power, baptizing, and moving men to repentance, as none of the other prophets had done". The mention of both priests and levites together is "a trait illustrative of John’s precision of statement".

Verse 19 contains the first of around seventy occurrences of the expression "the Jews" (οἱ Ἰουδαῖοι, hoi Ioudaioi) in the Gospel. D. A. Carson notes that the phrase is used in a variety of senses: sometimes neutrally, explaining a custom for readers outside Palestine (John 2:6); sometimes positively ("salvation is from the Jews", John 4:22; Jesus is himself a Jew, John 4:9); sometimes geographically, of the people of Judea (John 7:1); but most commonly of the Jewish leaders, especially those of Jerusalem and Judea, as here, who are cast as the focal point of opposition to Jesus. Carson observes that not all leaders are presented negatively (citing Nicodemus and Joseph of Arimathea), and argues that this diversity of usage tells against reading the Gospel as a blanket polemic against all Jews; he regards a charge of anti-Semitism as unreasonable, given that the Evangelist was himself a Jew, and holds that even "anti-Judaism" misses the mark, since the writer seeks not to attack Judaism but to press the claim that Jesus is its fulfilment.

On the envoys themselves, Carson explains that, with the Sanhedrin largely controlled by the family of the high priest, it was natural for the delegation to consist of priests and Levites, who would in any case be concerned with questions of ritual purification and therefore with John's baptizing. He notes that Levites belonged to the tribe of Levi but were not descended from the family of Aaron, so could not serve as priests; in Jesus' day they assisted in temple worship, chiefly as musicians, and served as the temple police. Carson adds that John the Baptist was himself a Levite and the son of a priest, facts unlikely to have been unknown given the prominence of his ministry. Carson observes that, although the other Gospels do not mention this official probing of the Baptist, there is nothing intrinsically improbable in it: given the wide influence John exerted (compare Matthew 3:5), it would have been irresponsible of the leaders had they failed to investigate him.

Craig S. Keener notes that sending an inquiry to a prophet fits biblical precedent (for example 2 Kings 19:2; Isaiah 37:2), though here the messengers seem to act more from suspicion of John than from a wish to hear him. He observes that priests retained great prominence in all parts of Judaism before the destruction of the temple, that most of the priestly aristocracy were Sadducees, and that the sending of formal messengers in this period is well attested specifically of the high-priestly temple hierarchy, those with official authority. The requirement that John's interrogators report back to those who sent them (John 1:22) underlines their official character.

Keener draws attention to a tension within the narrative: although verse 19 has priests and Levites sent by "the Jews", John 1:24 describes the senders as Pharisees, who as a group did not in the early first century exercise authority over priests and Levites. He suggests that the Evangelist, writing at a time when Pharisaic authority was more advanced and hostile to Jewish Christians, has couched an earlier tradition in terms meaningful to his own audience; another strand of tradition places the same question on the hearts of "the people" (Luke 3:15). Keener nonetheless regards the underlying scenario as historically plausible, since a Sadducean aristocracy would have wished to investigate a prophet drawing large crowds before the Romans did (compare John 11:47–50), and he notes that John the Baptist may himself have reacted against the aristocratic Jerusalem priesthood from which his own priestly background sprang (Luke 1:5).

== Commentary from the Church Fathers ==
Origen: "This is the second testimony of John the Baptist to Christ, the first began with, This is He of Whom I spake; and ended with, He hath declared Him."

Theophylact of Ohrid: "Or, after the introduction above of John's testimony to Christ, is preferred before me, the Evangelist now adds when the above testimony was given, And this is the record of John, when the Jews sent priests and Levites from Jerusalem."

Origen: "The Jews of Jerusalem, as being of kin to the Baptist, who was of the priestly stock, send Priests and Levites to ask him who he is; that is, men considered to hold a superior rank to the rest of their order, by God's election, and coming from that favoured above all cities, Jerusalem. Such is the reverential way in which they interrogate John. We read of no such proceeding towards Christ: but what the Jews did to John, John in turn does to Christ, when he asks Him, through His disciples, Art thou He that should come, (Luke 7:20) or look we for another?"

Chrysostom: "Such confidence had they in John, that they were ready to believe him on his own words: witness how it is said, To ask him, Who art thou?"

Augustine: "They would not have sent, unless they had been impressed by his lofty exercise of authority, in daring to baptize."

Preceded by John 1:18	Gospel of John; Chapter 1	Succeeded by John 1:20
