= John 1:20 =

- ← 1:19 1:21 →
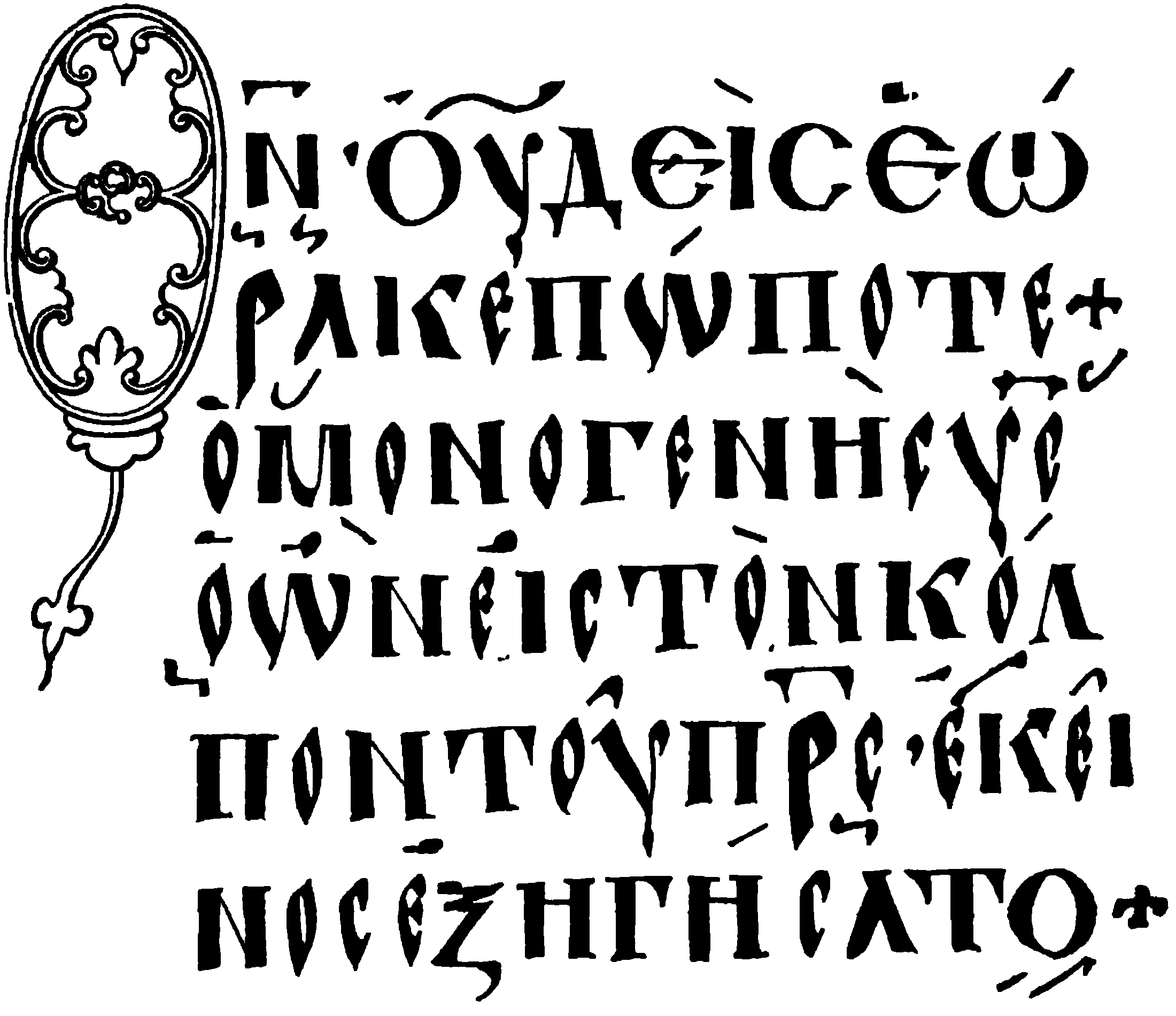
- John 1:18-20 in Codex Harcleianus (Lectionary 150) from 995 AD.
- Book: Gospel of John
- Christian Bible part: New Testament

John 1:20 is the twentieth verse in the first chapter of the Gospel of John in the New Testament of the Christian Bible.

== Content ==
In the original Greek according to Westcott-Hort this verse is:

Καὶ ὡμολόγησε, καὶ οὐκ ἠρνήσατο· καὶ ὡμολόγησεν ὅτι Οὐκ εἰμὶ ἐγὼ ὁ Χριστός.

In the King James Version of the Bible the text reads:

And he confessed, and denied not; but confessed, I am not the Christ.

The New International Version translates the passage as:

He did not fail to confess, but confessed freely, "I am not the Christ. "

== Analysis ==
Craig S. Keener notes that the Baptist's denial carries an emphatic "I" in the Greek (John 1:20; also John 3:28), which may hint that he is about to confess another as the Christ. The doubled wording, that he "confessed" and "did not deny" but "confessed", is more than Semitic parallelism; Keener takes it as varied repetition for emphasis, sounding almost like a reply to the charge that John claimed to be more than a prophet.

Keener notes that earlier tradition agrees with the Fourth Gospel that some people thought John might be the Christ (Luke 3:15), and that he replied by pointing to a mightier one to come (Matthew 3:11), though the Fourth Gospel develops the exchange more fully than the other accounts. He suggests the language of the denial may be set in deliberate contrast to the confession the tradition reports for Jesus before the Jerusalem authorities (Mark 14:61–62).

D. A. Carson notes that the exact question put to the Baptist is not preserved, but that his straightforward answer, "I am not the Christ", shows what was being sought. First-century Palestine was rich in messianic expectation: some looked for a Davidic Messiah, others (as at Qumran, in the Community Rule) for a priestly Messiah as well, besides "the prophet". It is at this point that the Gospel introduces the term "Christ" (χριστός), the verbal adjective of χρίω ("to anoint"), the Greek equivalent of the Hebrew "Messiah".

Carson adds that the forceful wording, "he did not fail to confess, but confessed freely", is the Evangelist's way of showing that even the Baptist's denial that he was the Christ formed part of his positive witness to the true Christ.

== Commentary from the Church Fathers ==
Origen: "John, as it appears, saw from the question, that the Priests and Levites had doubts whether it might not be the Christ, who was baptizing; which doubts however they were afraid to profess openly, for fear of incurring the charge of credulity. He wisely determines therefore first to correct their mistake, and then to proclaim the truth. Accordingly, he first of all shows that he is not the Christ: And he confessed, and denied not; but confessed, I am not the Christ. We may add here, that at this time the people had already begun to be impressed with the idea that Christ’s advent was at hand, in consequence of the interpretations which the lawyers had collected out of the sacred writings to that effect. Thus Theudas had been enabled to collect together a considerable body, on the strength of his pretending to be the Christ; and after him Judas, in the days of the, taxation, had done the same. (Acts 5) Such being the strong expectation of Christ’s advent then prevalent, the Jews send to John, intending by the question, Who art thou? to extract from him whether he were the Christ."

Gregory the Great: "He denied directly being what he was not, but he did not deny what he was: thus, by his speaking truth, becoming a true member of Him Whose name he had not dishonestly usurped."

Preceded by John 1:19	Gospel of John; Chapter 1	Succeeded by John 1:21
