= John 1:15 =

- ← 1:14 1:16 →
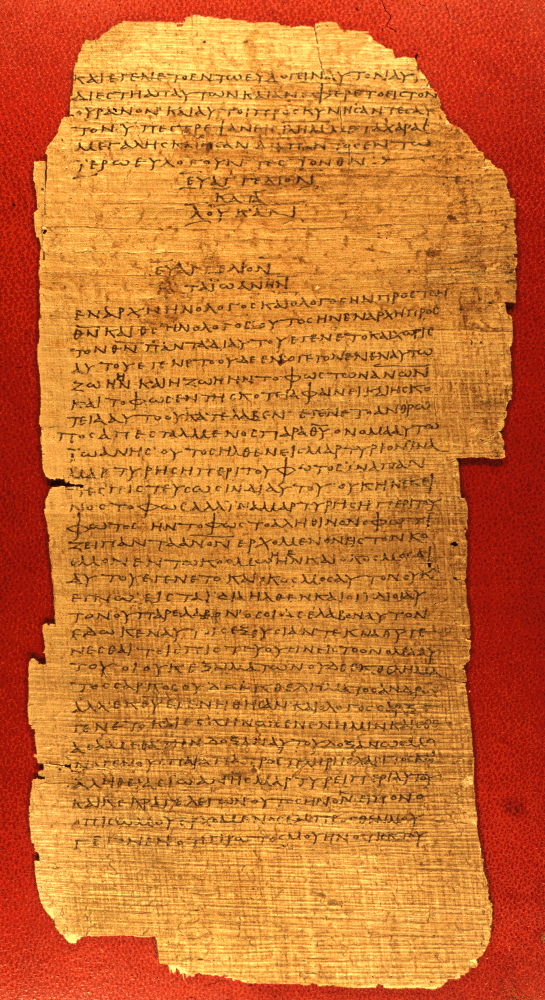
- John 1:1–16 in Papyrus 75 (AD 175–225)
- Book: Gospel of John
- Christian Bible part: New Testament

John 1:15 is the fifteenth verse in the first chapter of the Gospel of John in the New Testament of the Christian Bible. It relates the witness of John the Baptist to Jesus, who comes after him.

== Content ==
In the original Greek according to Westcott-Hort, this verse is:

Ἰωάννης μαρτυρεῖ περὶ αὐτοῦ, καὶ κέκραγε λέγων, Οὗτος ἦν ὃν εἶπον, Ὁ ὀπίσω μου ἐρχόμενος ἔμπροσθέν μου γέγονεν· ὅτι πρῶτός μου ἦν.

In the King James Version of the Bible, the text reads:

John bare witness of him, and cried, saying, This was he of whom I spake, He that cometh after me is preferred before me: for he was before me.

The New International Version translates the passage as:

John testifies concerning him. He cries out, saying, "This was he of whom I said, 'He who comes after me has surpassed me because he was before me.'"

== Analysis ==
The sense of "is preferred before me", according to Robert Witham is that he who is greater in dignity, deserves greater honour, even though he was born after me, he was from eternity.

Because John 1:16 would follow smoothly on John 1:14, some scholars have regarded verse 15 as a later interpolation. D. A. Carson argues instead that it is a deliberate parenthetical remark: whereas the earlier mention of John the Baptist in John 1:6–8 concerned the coming of the pre-existent light into the world, this verse grounds the glory of the incarnate Word in a concrete individual attested by another individual, and so prepares for the detailed account of the Baptist's witness that immediately follows the prologue.

Carson notes that the present tense "testifies" followed immediately by the perfect tense (literally "he has cried out") presents the Baptist's witness both vividly, as though still in progress, and comprehensively, summing it up as a set-piece.

On the central saying, "he who comes after me has surpassed me because he was before me", Carson observes that in all four Gospels Jesus entered public ministry after John, which in a society where age and precedence conferred honour might have suggested to superficial observers that the Baptist was the greater of the two. The Baptist denies this: Jesus "has surpassed" him (literally "became before me"), and does so "because he was before" him, an expression meaning "because he was first with respect to me". Carson takes this to include not only temporal priority, picking up the pre-existence emphasized at the start of the chapter, but also absolute primacy of rank.

Carson further argues that the prologue's two references to the Baptist (John 1:6–8 and verse 15) are deliberately placed rather than repetitious. Following a chiastic analysis of the prologue proposed by R. Alan Culpepper, in which 1:6–8 parallels 1:15, Carson holds that the first reference casts the transitory Baptist as a foil for the light coming into the world, while the second reintroduces his witness at the point where the incarnation of the Word has been declared (1:14), so that the testimony "rises to the level of historical particularity".

Craig S. Keener reads the verse as part of the Gospel's wider concern to subordinate John the Baptist to Jesus. John's public ministry preceded that of Jesus, and the Fourth Gospel acknowledges that their ministries overlapped and that John was at first the more prominent (John 3:22–24, John 3:30); since some could therefore cast Jesus as John's disciple, the Evangelist takes pains to assert that the Word both outranked John and existed before him, having been "in the beginning with God" (John 1:1–2). Keener relates the saying to the parallel tradition that the Baptist humbled himself before the coming one, also preserved at John 1:27, John 1:30, and Mark 1:7 (compare Matthew 3:11).

== Commentary from the Church Fathers ==
Thomas Aquinas assembled the following quotations regarding this verse from the early Fathers of the Church:

- Alcuin: "He had said before that there was a man sent to bear witness; now he gives definitely the forerunner’s own testimony, which plainly declared the excellence of His Human Nature and the Eternity of His Godhead. John bare witness of Him."
- Theophylact of Ohrid: "He saith, Who cometh after me, that is, as to the time of His birth. John was six months before Christ, according to His humanity."
- Chrysostom: "Or this does not refer to the birth from Mary; for Christ was born, when this was said by John; but to His coming for the work of preaching. He then saith, is made before me; that is, is more illustrious, more honourable; as if he said, Do not suppose me greater than He, because I came first to preach."
- Theophylact of Ohrid: "The Arians infer from this word (γέγονεν, gegonen) that the Son of God is not begotten of the Father, but made like any other creature."
- Augustine: "It does not mean—He was made before I was made; but He is preferred to me."
- Chrysostom: "If the words, made before me, referred to His coming into being, it was superfluous to add, For He was before me. For who would be so foolish as not to know, that if He was made before him, He was before him. It would have been more correct to say, He was before me, because He was made before me. The expression then, He was made before me, must be taken in the sense of honour: only that which was to take place, he speaks of as having taken place already, after the style of the old Prophets, who commonly talk of the future as the past."

Preceded by John 1:14	Gospel of John; Chapter 1	Succeeded by John 1:16
