= John 1:22 =

- ← 1:21 1:23 →
- Book: Gospel of John
- Christian Bible part: New Testament

John 1:22 is a verse in the first chapter of the Gospel of John in the New Testament.

== Content ==
In the original Greek according to Westcott-Hort this verse is:

εἶπαν οὖν αὐτῷ, Τίς εἶ; ἵνα ἀπόκρισιν δῶμεν τοῖς πέμψασιν ἡμᾶς· τί λέγεις περὶ σεαυτοῦ;

In the King James Version of the Bible the text reads:

Then said they unto him, Who art thou? that we may give an answer to them that sent us. What sayest thou of thyself?

The New International Version translates the passage as:

Finally they said, "Who are you? Give us an answer to take back to those who sent us. What do you say about yourself?"

== Analysis ==
Having denied that he is the Christ, Elijah, or the Prophet (John 1:20–21), John the Baptist is pressed for a positive statement about himself. D. A. Carson notes that the delegation, sent by the leaders in Jerusalem, knew it had to return with more than a series of denials, so that the least the Baptist could do was to articulate what he made of himself and what significance he attached to his own ministry.

Craig S. Keener observes that the interrogators' need to give an answer "to those who sent" them underlines their official character as envoys (compare 2 Samuel 24:13). The language reflects the ancient concept of agency, in which an envoy or messenger bore the authority of the one who sent him, a sender's representative being treated as in some sense equivalent to the sender himself.

Keener also treats the verse as a transition within the account of John's testimony: having said who he is not (John 1:20–21), the Baptist now turns to his function as a witness to another (John 1:22–27) and to his role in preparing the way for one greater than himself (John 1:22–23).

The Cambridge Bible for Schools and Colleges observes that the delegation "continue asking as to his person; he replies as to his office", and that "in the presence of the Messiah the personality of His Forerunner is lost". The Pulpit Commentary notes that the connective "then" (οὖν) presents the question as the consequence of the Baptist's threefold denial, the envoys requiring a positive account to render to the body that had sent them.

Preceded by John 1:21	Gospel of John; Chapter 1	Succeeded by John 1:23
