= John 1:9 =

- ← 1:8 1:10 →
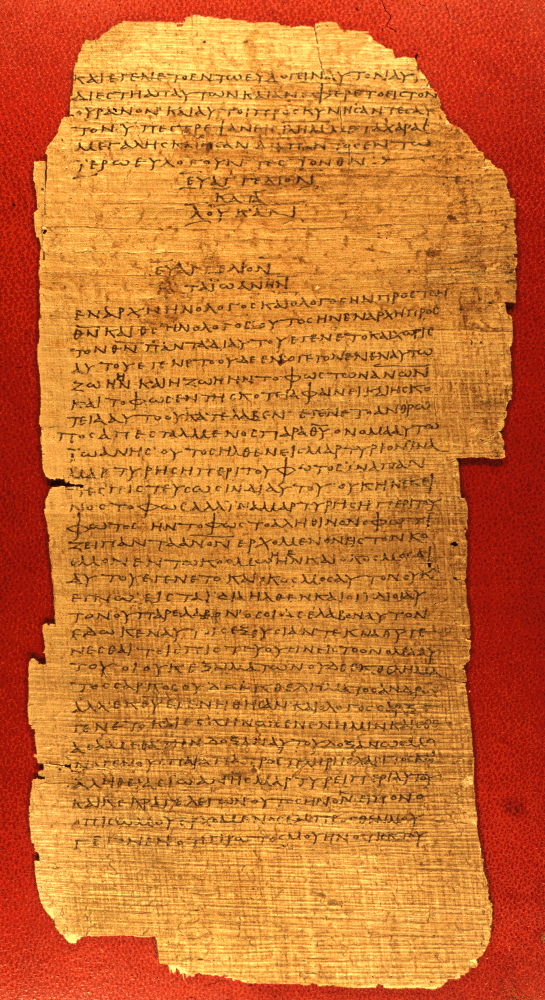
- John 1:1–16 in Papyrus 75 (AD 175–225)
- Book: Gospel of John
- Christian Bible part: New Testament

John 1:9 is the ninth verse in the first chapter of the Gospel of John in the New Testament of the Christian Bible.

== Content ==
In the original Greek according to Westcott-Hort this verse is:

Ἦν τὸ φῶς τὸ ἀληθινόν, ὃ φωτίζει πάντα ἄνθρωπον ἐρχόμενον εἰς τὸν κόσμον.

In the King James Version of the Bible, the text reads:

That was the true Light, which lighteth every man that cometh into the world.

The New International Version translates the passage as:

The true light that gives light to every man was coming into the world.

Rene Kieffer notes that παντα ανθρωπον ερχομενον εις τον κοσμον (panta anthrōpon erchomenon eis ton kosmou) could be read as the grammatical object in this sentence, meaning "everyone who is coming into the world". He argues that the redundancy of "who is coming into the world" makes this an unlikely translation, although the King James Version does take this approach.

== Analysis ==
=== Analysis of "true" ===
On the word "true" (ἀληθινός, alēthinos), D. A. Carson observes that in John it usually means "real" or "genuine": it is applied to the light here, to true worshippers (John 4:23), to the bread from heaven (John 6:32), to the vine (John 15:1), and to God himself (John 17:3), so that where others claim to be light, vine, or bread, John presents the genuine one. Carson notes the sense often shades into "ultimate", the contrast being not merely with what is false but with what is earlier and provisional: the manna was genuinely from God, yet Jesus is the true bread; the law and Wisdom give light, yet the Word is the true light, the full and final self-disclosure of God. Craig S. Keener adds that such adjectives of genuineness most often apply in the Gospel to Jesus or to the Father, and that the designation "true" carries a polemical force, distinguishing its subject from lesser alternatives; in a pluralistic pagan setting it made sense to speak of the "true God", while here the contrast is set within a Jewish context, with John the Baptist.

=== Analysis of "light" ===
In terms of the expression "true light", Cornelius à Lapide says that "because Christ illuminates us far more truly and perfectly than any corporeal light does, therefore spiritual light alone deserves the name of light". He goes on to say that visible light is merely a shadow of the true. In like manner Christ says in John 15:1, "I am the true Vine." Also in John 6:55, He calls Himself the "true Bread". So that in a sense "that which is perfect, and of surpassing excellency, is often called true."

=== Analysis of "every man" ===
Keener notes that interpreters dispute whether the light's enlightening of "every man" means a universal availability to all who receive the witness, or a portion of the Word present in all people, and that lexical analysis alone cannot decide the question. He relates the verse to the Jewish tradition that God offered the light of his Word, or Torah, to all the nations, providing the light for all humanity in Jesus' incarnation just as, in that tradition, he had offered the light of Torah to all nations at Mount Sinai.

=== Analysis of "coming into the world" ===
The phrase "coming in the world" is said by John McEvilly to mean "born into the world", so that it agrees with "every man" and not with "the true light". Carson also argues that "coming into the world" is best taken with "the light" rather than with "every man". He notes that the rabbinic expression "all who come into the world", used to mean "every man", is always plural, whereas the construction here is singular, and that "coming into the world" or "being sent into the world" is repeatedly said of the Word elsewhere in the Gospel. On this reading it is the light, the Word, that is coming into the world in an act distinct from creation, the same special visitation set out more fully at John 1:14.

Keener agrees that, although the participle could grammatically attach either to the light or to "every person", it most likely refers to the light and, in context, to the incarnation: the verb "coming" (ἐρχόμενος) is characteristically applied to Jesus throughout the Gospel (John 1:15; John 3:31; John 6:14). Keener resists the view of some church fathers, and of Marie-Émile Boismard, that the present participle points instead to manifestations of the Word before the incarnation, holding that the light to which John the Baptist testifies is the incarnate Christ.

== Commentary from the Church Fathers ==
Thomas Aquinas assembled the following quotations regarding this verse from the early Fathers of the Church:

- Augustine: "What Light it is to which John bears witness, he shows himself, saying, That was the true Light."
- Augustine: "Wherefore is there added, true? Because man enlightened is called light, but the true Light is that which lightens. For our eyes are called lights, and yet, without a lamp at night, or the sun by day, these lights are open to no purpose. Wherefore he adds: which lighteneth every man: but if every man, then John himself. He Himself then enlightened the person, by whom He wished Himself to be pointed out. And just as we may often, from the reflection of the sun’s rays on some object, know the sun to be risen, though we cannot look at the sun itself; as even feeble eyes can look at an illuminated wall, or some object of that kind: even so, those to whom Christ came, being too weak to behold Him, He threw His rays upon John; John confessed the illumination, and so the Illuminator Himself was discovered. It is said, that cometh into the world. Had man not departed from Him, he had not had to be enlightened; but therefore is he to be here enlightened, because he departed thence, when he might have been enlightened."
- Augustine: "Or the words, lighteneth every man, may be understood to mean, not that there is no one who is not enlightened, but that no one is enlightened except by Him."
- Chrysostom: "Or thus; Having said above that John had come, and was sent, to bear witness of the Light, lest any from the recent coming of the witness, should infer the same of Him who is witnessed to, the Evangelist takes us back to that existence which is beyond all beginning, saying, That was the true Light."
- Chrysostom: "Where are those too, who deny Him to be very God? We see here that He is called very Light. But if He lighteneth every man that cometh into the world, how is it that so many have gone on without light? For all have not known the worship of Christ. The answer is: He only enlighteneth every man, so far as pertains to Him. If men shut their eyes, and will not receive the rays of this light, their darkness arises not from the fault of the light, but from their own wickedness, inasmuch as they voluntarily deprive themselves of the gift of grace. For grace is poured out upon all; and they, who will not enjoy the gift, may impute it to their own blindness."
- Theophylact of Ohrid: "Let the Manichean blush, who pronounces us the creatures of a dark and malignant creator: for we should never be enlightened, were we not the children of the true Light."
- Theophylact of Ohrid: "Or thus: The intellect which is given in us for our direction, and which is called natural reason, is said here to be a light given us by God. But some by the ill use of their reason have darkened themselves."
- Bede: "Including both natural and divine wisdom; for as no one can exist of himself, so no one can be wise of himself."
- Origen: "Or thus: We must not understand the words, lighteneth every man that cometh into the world, of the growth from hidden seeds to organized bodies, but of the entrance into the invisible world, by the spiritual regeneration and grace, which is given in Baptism. Those then the true Light lighteneth, who come into the world of goodness, not those who rush into the world of sin."

Preceded by John 1:8	Gospel of John; Chapter 1	Succeeded by John 1:10
