= John 1:12 =

- ← 1:11 1:13 →
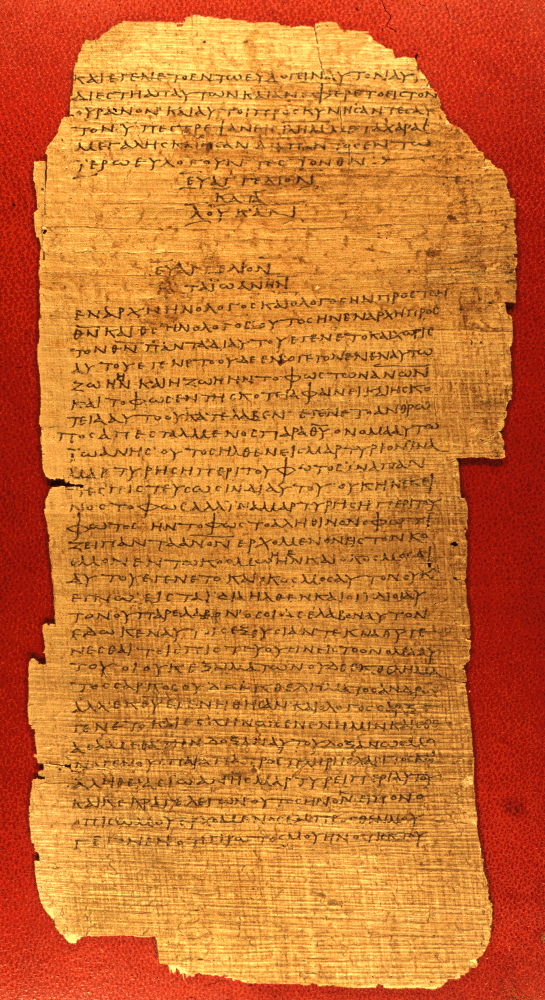
- John 1:1–16 in Papyrus 75 (AD 175–225)
- Book: Gospel of John
- Christian Bible part: New Testament

John 1:12 is the twelfth verse in the first chapter of the Gospel of John in the New Testament of the Christian Bible.

== Content ==
In the original Greek according to Westcott-Hort, this verse is:

Ὅσοι δὲ ἔλαβον αὐτόν, ἔδωκεν αὐτοῖς ἐξουσίαν τέκνα Θεοῦ γενέσθαι, τοῖς πιστεύουσιν εἰς τὸ ὄνομα αὐτοῦ·

In the King James Version of the Bible, the text reads:

But as many as received him, to them gave he power to become the sons of God, even to them that believe on his name:

The New International Version translates the passage as:

Yet to all who received him, to those who believed in his name, he gave the right to become children of God.

== Analysis ==
The sentiment here agrees with the purpose of the whole of John's Gospel, as explained in John 20:31:

...that you may believe that Jesus is the Christ, the Son of God, and that by believing you may have life in his name.

Cornelius à Lapide comments on the phrase "on Him", as signifying the Person of Christ, and that the full meaning is "as many as have received Christ, that is, to all who believe in His name, He has given power to become sons of God", which has the same sense as in 1 John 5:1: "Whosoever believes that Jesus is the Christ, is born of God."

D. A. Carson argues that vv. 11–13 form a small chiasm in which John 1:11 parallels John 1:13 and 1:12a parallels 1:12c, leaving the central clause "he gave them the right to become children of God" (1:12b) as the pivot on which the whole structure turns. On this reading, the prologue's announcement of the Word made flesh (1:14) and the revelation of God in him (1:18) is balanced by an announcement of the human result of that revelation: certain people, and not others, become children of God; the rest of the Gospel narrates who they are.

Craig S. Keener observes that "believing in his name" in v. 12 evokes the long Jewish tradition of "the Name" as a circumlocution for God himself: the righteous are repeatedly summoned in the Hebrew Bible and Second Temple literature to trust in God's name, so that trust in Jesus' name implies trust in him as deity. Keener notes further that "believing in his name" appears at only a small number of strategic points in the Fourth Gospel (1:12; 2:23; 3:18; 20:31), forming a deliberate inclusio between the prologue and the Gospel's statement of purpose at John 20:31. On the lexical question, Keener observes that the Greek noun ἐξουσία, rendered "right" by the NIV and "power" by the KJV, may also be translated "freedom" or "authority"; in v. 12 it emphasises divine authorisation to become what no human effort could accomplish, in pointed contrast to the natural categories of birth that the next verse will deny.

Keener situates the title "children of God" against Palestinian Jewish texts (notably the Dead Sea Scrolls, the Psalms of Solomon, and the Wisdom of Solomon) in which the people of Israel as a whole are God's children. In the Fourth Gospel, given the disclosure that "his own" did not receive him in v. 11, the title is reassigned: those who do receive Jesus assume the covenant role granted to Israel as a people. Keener reads v. 12 as therefore neither a Hellenistic claim about humanity's universal kinship with God (as in some Stoic and Philonic texts) nor a mystery-cult formula, but a Jewish covenantal title rewritten around faith in Jesus.

Carson notes that the Johannine vocabulary of v. 12 ("become children of God") and v. 13 ("born of God") is taken up explicitly later in the Gospel in the discourse with Nicodemus, where "to be born again" or "to be born from above" (John 3:3) refers to the same reality reached here through faith in the name of the incarnate Word.

== Commentary from the Church Fathers ==
Thomas Aquinas assembled the following quotations regarding this verse from the early Fathers of the Church:

- Augustine: "But if none at all received, none will be saved. For no one will he saved, but he who received Christ at His coming; and therefore he adds, As many as received Him."
- Chrysostom: "Whether they be bond or free, Greek or Barbarian, wise or unwise, women or men, the young or the aged, all are made meet for the honour, which the Evangelist now proceeds to mention. To them gave He power to become the sons of God."
- Augustine: "O amazing goodness! He was born the Only Son, yet would not remain so; but grudged not to admit joint heirs to His inheritance. Nor was this narrowed by many partaking of it."
- Chrysostom: "He saith not that He made them the sons of God, but gave them power to become the sons of God: showing that there is need of much care, to preserve the image, which is formed by our adoption in Baptism, untarnished: and showing at the same time also that no one can take this power from us, except we rob ourselves of it. Now, if the delegates of worldly governments have often nearly as much power as those governments themselves, much more is this the case with us, who derive our dignity from God. But at the same time the Evangelist wishes to show that this grace comes to us of our own will and endeavour: that, in short, the operation of grace being supposed, it is in the power of our free will to make us the sons of God."
- Theophylact of Ohrid: "Or the meaning is, that the most perfect sonship will only be attained at the resurrection, as saith the Apostle, Waiting for the adoption, to wit, the redemption of our body. (Rom. 8:23) He therefore gave us the power to become the sons of God, i. e. the power of obtaining this grace at some future time."
- Chrysostom: "And because in the matter of these ineffable benefits, the giving of grace belongs to God, but the extending of faith to man, He subjoins, even to those who believe on his name. Why then declarest thou not, John, the punishment of those who received Him not? Is it because there is no greater punishment than that, when the power of becoming the sons of God is offered to men, they should not become such, but voluntarily deprive themselves of the dignity? But besides this, inextinguishable fire awaits all such, as will appear clearly farther on."

| Preceded by John 1:11 | Gospel of John; Chapter 1 | Succeeded by John 1:13 |
