= John 1:21 =

- ← 1:20 1:22 →
- Book: Gospel of John
- Christian Bible part: New Testament

John 1:21 is a verse in the first chapter of the Gospel of John in the New Testament.

== Content ==
In this verse, the priests and Levites speak to John the Baptist. In the original Greek according to Westcott-Hort this verse is:

Καὶ ἠρώτησαν αὐτόν, Τί οὖν; Ἠλίας εἶ σύ; Καὶ λέγει, Οὐκ εἰμί. Ὁ προφήτης εἶ σύ; Καὶ ἀπεκρίθη, Οὔ.

In the King James Version of the Bible the text reads:

And they asked him, What then? Art thou Elias? And he saith, I am not. Art thou that prophet? And he answered, No.

The New International Version translates the passage as:

They asked him, "Then who are you? Are you Elijah?" He said, "I am not. Are you the Prophet?" He answered, "No."

== Analysis ==
=== John the Baptist as Elijah ===
The prophecy of Malachi (4:5, 6) states, "Behold, I send you Elijah the prophet before the great and terrible day of the Lord come." This Elijah, who had been taken up into heaven, was believed to precede the coming of the Messiah. However it appears that Scribes and Pharisees overlooked the fact that there might be two comings, the first of which is alluded to in Malachi 3:1, "For I, says the Lord, will send My messenger, and he shall prepare My way before My face.".

D. A. Carson notes that, since God had promised through Malachi 4:5 to send Elijah before the day of the Lord, the delegation next asks whether the Baptist is Elijah; his dress resembled Elijah's (Mark 1:6; 2 Kings 1:8), and false prophets had sometimes imitated such a prophet's clothing (Zechariah 13:4). Carson observes that the Synoptic Gospels report Jesus identifying John with the promised Elijah (Matthew 11:14; Matthew 17:12; Mark 9:13), but never that the Baptist made the connection himself; his refusal here, set beside the Synoptic evidence, may suggest that he did not attach as much significance to his own ministry as Jesus did.

Craig S. Keener reads the denial as part of the Fourth Gospel's tendency to play down the Baptist's stature in the face of exaggerated contemporary claims for him, declining to grant him even the role of Elijah that he appears to have held in pre-Markan tradition (Mark 1:6). Keener notes that even the Synoptists did not suppose John was literally Elijah, and suggests that the historical John, if he understood himself as a forerunner, may have thought of himself as an Elijah in a figurative sense, or as a forerunner for Elijah, in which case he would have regarded the one coming after him as literally "before" him (John 1:30).

MacEvilly explains that since John denied that he was the Christ, the messengers asked him if he were Elijah, because God took him away, so that he might be the forerunner of Christ. Therefore, the Jews of the time were then in expectation. As we read in Malachi 4:5, “Behold, I send you Elijah the prophet before the great and terrible day of the Lord come,” which speaks of the day of judgment, when Christ will return as Judge of the world. Still, according to Lapide, it appears the Scribes did not understand this, assuming instead there would be only one advent of Christ, for which the precursor would be Elijah. However, according to Malachi 3:1 there would be another precursor of Christ: “For I,” saith the Lord, “do send My messenger, and he shall prepare My way before My face.”

=== John the Baptist as a prophet ===
Lapide points out the definite article is used with prophet, 'Ὁ προφήτης' (the prophet) in their question, but that Christ did not need a prophet like Moses who relied on Aaron.

Carson explains that the promise of a prophet like Moses who would speak the words of God (Deuteronomy 18:15–18) was early understood to refer to a special end-time figure, whom the Samaritans identified with the Messiah; however the figure was conceived, Carson notes, it was not fulfilled in the Baptist, and he answers "No".

Keener adds that "the Prophet" of this verse refers to Deuteronomy 18:15–18, a figure sometimes merged with Elijah but more often treated as distinct, and one expectation among several. A text from Qumran links an eschatological prophet with the messiahs of Aaron and Israel while distinguishing all three, and Samaritan expectation, focused on the Pentateuch, emphasised this prophet especially. Early Christian tradition, Keener notes, found the fulfilment of the Deuteronomy promise in Jesus (Acts 3:22; Acts 7:37).

== Commentary from the Church Fathers ==
Augustine: "For they knew that Elias was to preach Christ; the name of Christ not being unknown to any among the Jews; but they did not think that He our Lord was the Christ: and yet did not altogether imagine that there was no Christ about to come. In this way, while looking forward to the future, they mistook at the present."

Augustine: "Or because John was more than a prophet: for that the prophets announced Him afar off, but John pointed Him out actually present."

Gregory the Great: "These words gave rise to a very different question. In another place, our Lord, when asked by His disciples concerning the coming of Elias, replied, If ye will receive it, this is Elias. (Mat. 11:14) But John says, I am not Elias. How is he then a preacher of the truth, if he agrees not with what that very Truth declares?... But if we examine the truth accurately, that which sounds inconsistent, will be found not really so. The Angel told Zacharias concerning John, He shall go before Him in the spirit and power of Elias. (Luke 1:17) As Elias then will preach the second advent of our Lord, so John preached His first; as the former will come as the precursor of the Judge, so the latter was made the precursor of the Redeemer. John was Elias in spirit, not in person: and what our Lord affirms of the spirit, John denies of the Person: there being a kind of propriety in this; viz. that our Lord to His disciples should speak spiritually of John, and that John, in answering the carnal multitude, should speak of his body, not of his spirit."

Origen: "Some one will say that John was ignorant that he was Elias; as those say, who maintain, from this passage the doctrine of a second incorporation, as though the soul took up a new body, after leaving its old one. For the Jews, it is said, asking John by the Levites and priests, whether he is Elias, suppose the doctrine of a second body to be already certain; as though it rested upon tradition, and were part of their secret system. To which question, however, John replies, I am not Elias: not being acquainted with his own prior existence. But how is it reasonable to imagine, if John were a prophet enlightened by the Spirit, and had revealed so much concerning the Father, and the Only-Begotten, that he could be so in the dark as to himself, as not to know that his own soul had once belonged to Elias?"

Origen: "He answers then the Levites and Priests, I am not, conjecturing what their question meant: for the purport of their examination was to discover, not whether the spirit in both was the same, but whether John was that very Elias, who was taken up, now appearing again, as the Jews expected, without another birth. But he whom we mentioned above as holding this doctrine of a reincorporation, will say that it is not consistent that the Priests and Levites should be ignorant of the birth of the son of so dignified a priest as Zacharias, who was born too in his father's old age, and contrary to all human probabilities: especially when Luke declares, that fear came on all that dwelt round about them. (Luke 1:65) But perhaps, since Elias was expected to appear before the coming of Christ near the end, they may seem to put the question figuratively, Art thou he who announces the coming of Christ at the end of the world? to which he answers, I am not. But there is in fact nothing strange in supposing that John's birth might not have been known to all. For as in the case of our Saviour many knew Him to be born of Mary, and yet some wrongly imagined that He was John the Baptist, or Elias, or one of the Prophets; so in the case of John, some were not unacquainted with the fact of his being son of Zacharias, and yet some may have been in doubt whether he were not the Elias who was expected. Again, inasmuch as many prophets had arisen in Israel, but one was especially looked forward to, of whom Moses had prophesied, The Lord thy God will raise up unto thee a Prophet from the midst of thee, of thy brethren, like unto me; unto Him shall ye hearken: they ask him in the third place, not simply whether he is a prophet, but with the article prefixed, Art thou that Prophet? For every one of the prophets in succession had signified to the people of Israel that he was not the one whom Moses had prophesied of; who, like Moses, was to stand in the midst between God and man, and deliver a testament, sent from God to His disciples. They did not however apply this name to Christ, but thought that He was to be a different person; whereas John knew that Christ was that Prophet, and therefore to this question, he answered, No."

Preceded by John 1:20	Gospel of John; Chapter 1	Succeeded by John 1:22
