= John 1:10 =

- ← 1:9 1:11 →
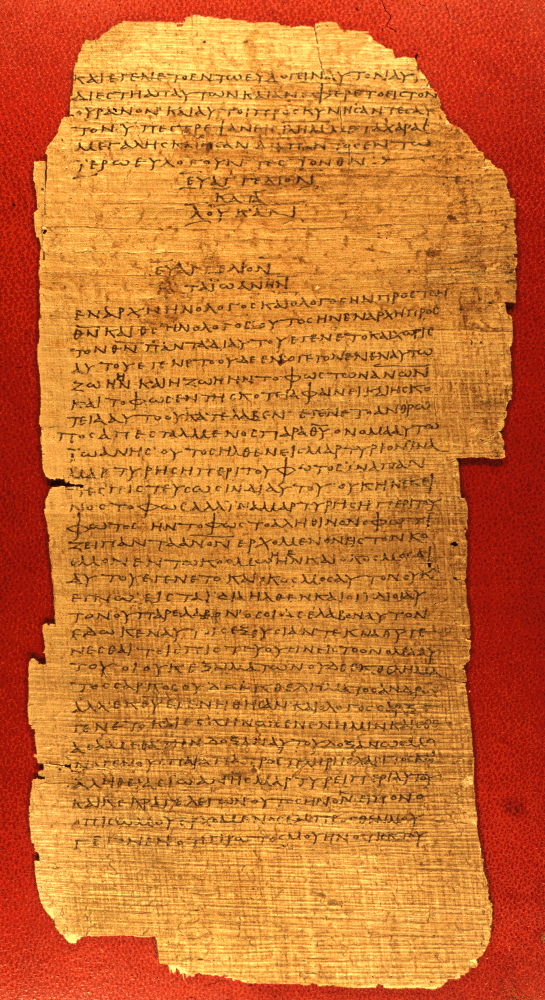
- John 1:1–16 in Papyrus 75 (AD 175–225)
- Book: Gospel of John
- Christian Bible part: New Testament

John 1:10 is the tenth verse in the first chapter of the Gospel of John in the New Testament of the Christian Bible.

== Content ==
In the original Greek according to Westcott-Hort this verse is:

Ἐν τῷ κόσμῳ ἦν, καὶ ὁ κόσμος δι᾿ αὐτοῦ ἐγένετο, καὶ ὁ κόσμος αὐτὸν οὐκ ἔγνω.

In the King James Version of the Bible, the text reads:

He was in the world, and the world was made by him, and the world knew him not.

The New International Version translates the passage as:

He was in the world, and though the world was made through him, the world did not recognize him.

== Analysis ==
Concerning the verse "He was in the world ... ", many have understood this verse to refer to Jesus Christ, who, in the beliefs of Christianity, was in the world from the start of its first creation, producing and ruling over everything. The Jerusalem Bible suggests that "the world" variously means:

- the "cosmos", or "this earth"
- the human race, or
- "those hostile to God who hate Christ and his disciples".

According to Irish Archbishop John McEvilly, the second part of the verse tells us that the blind sinful world did not know and worship him, since it was caught up in worldly business. Later, in John 17:11, Jesus states that he is "no longer in the world". Heinrich Meyer observes the occurrence three times of the word κόσμος (kosmos), commenting that the repetition, "where, on the last occasion, the word has the narrower sense of the world of mankind, gives prominence to [a] mournful antithesis". D. A. Carson argues that although kosmos is occasionally neutral in John's Gospel and is the object of God's love at John 3:16, the majority of its uses are negative: not the universe as such but "the created order (especially of human beings and human affairs) in rebellion against its Maker," with this verse paradigmatic of that pattern. Carson further observes that v. 10 is not a mere repetition of John 1:3: "world" has a narrower focus than "everything that has been made", and by insisting that even this rebellious world was made through the Word, the Evangelist refuses any ontological dualism that would posit an independent principle of evil and instead grounds the moral responsibility of the human race in the doctrine of creation.

Craig S. Keener situates the verse against Jewish traditions in which personified divine wisdom is sent into the world but rejected and returns to heaven (notably Sirach 24:6–22); against that background, the prologue's pairing of v. 10 with John 1:11 contrasts the response of "the world" with that of Jesus's "own" Israel, who reject him still more deliberately. Keener notes that this "world" implicitly includes the initially ignorant Gentiles (John 4:42) yet remains an object of Christ's mission (John 3:16–17). On this reading, v. 10 also stands inside a Mosaic-revelation pattern: as Israel had to "know," "believe," and "receive" God's earlier self-disclosure, so the prologue announces that Jesus the incarnate Word meets a world that, with notable exceptions, fails on the first count.

On a structural reading proposed by Peder Borgen and adopted by Victor P. Hamilton, the prologue is a targumic exposition of Genesis 1:1–5 arranged as a chiasm in which vv. 10–13 form the b' member elaborating "all things came through him" of John 1:3, so that v. 10's "the world was made through him" looks back deliberately to the creation account.

== Commentary from the Church Fathers ==
Thomas Aquinas assembled the following quotations regarding this verse from the early Fathers of the Church:

- Augustine: "The Light which lighteneth every man that cometh into the world, came here in the flesh; because while He was here in His Divinity alone, the foolish, blind, and un-righteous could not discern Him; those of whom it is said above, The darkness comprehended it not. Hence the text; He was in the world."
- Origen: "For as, when a person leaves off speaking, his voice ceases to be, and vanishes; so if the Heavenly Father should cease to speak His Word, the effect of that Word, i. e. the universe which is created in the Word, shall cease to exist."
- Augustine: "You must not suppose, however, that He was in the world in the same sense in which the earth, cattle, men, are in the world; but in the sense in which an artificer controls his own work; whence the text, And the world was made by Him. Nor again did He make it after the manner of an artificer; for whereas an artificer is external to what he fabricates, God pervades the world, carrying on the work of creation in every part, and never absent from any part: by the presence of His Majesty He both makes and controls what is made. Thus He was in the world, as He by Whom the world was made."
- Chrysostom: "And again, because He was in the world, but not coeval with the world, for this cause he introduced the words, and the world was made by Him: thus taking you back again to the eternal existence of the Only-Begotten. For when we are told that the whole of creation was made by Him, we must be very dull not to acknowledge that the Maker existed before the work."
- Theophylact of Ohrid: "Here he overthrows at once the insane notion of the Manichaean, (Note: The reference may be to Marcion, according to a footnote in Aquinas' text.) who says that the world is the work of a malignant creature, and the opinion of the Arian, that the Son of God is a creature."
- Augustine: "But what meaneth this, The world was made by Him? The earth, sky, and sea, and all that are therein, are called the world. But in another sense, the lovers of the world are called the world, of whom he says, And the world knew Him not. For did the sky, or Angels, not know their Creator, Whom the very devils confess, Whom the whole universe has borne witness to? Who then did not know Him? Those who, from their love of the world, are called the world; for such live in heart in the world, while those who do not love it, have their body in the world, but their heart in heaven; as saith the Apostle, our conversation is in heaven. (Phil. 3:20) By their love of the world, such men merit being called by the name of the place where they live. And just as in speaking of a bad house, or good house, we do not mean praise or blame to the walls, but to the inhabitants; so when we talk of the world, we mean those who live there in the love of it."
- Chrysostom: "But they who were the friends of God, knew Him even before His presence in the body; whence Christ saith below, Your father Abraham rejoiced to see My day. When the Gentiles then interrupt us with the question, Why has He come in these last times to work our salvation, having neglected us so long? we reply, that He was in the world before, superintending what He had made, and was known to all who were worthy of Him; and that, if the world knew Him not, those of whom the world was not worthy knew Him. The reason follows, why the world knew Him not. The Evangelist calls those men the world, who are tied to the world, and savour of worldly things; for there is nothing that disturbs the mind so much, as this melting with the love of present things."

== Notes ==
Preceded by John 1:9	Gospel of John; Chapter 1	Succeeded by John 1:11
