= John 1:14 =

- ← 1:13 1:15 →
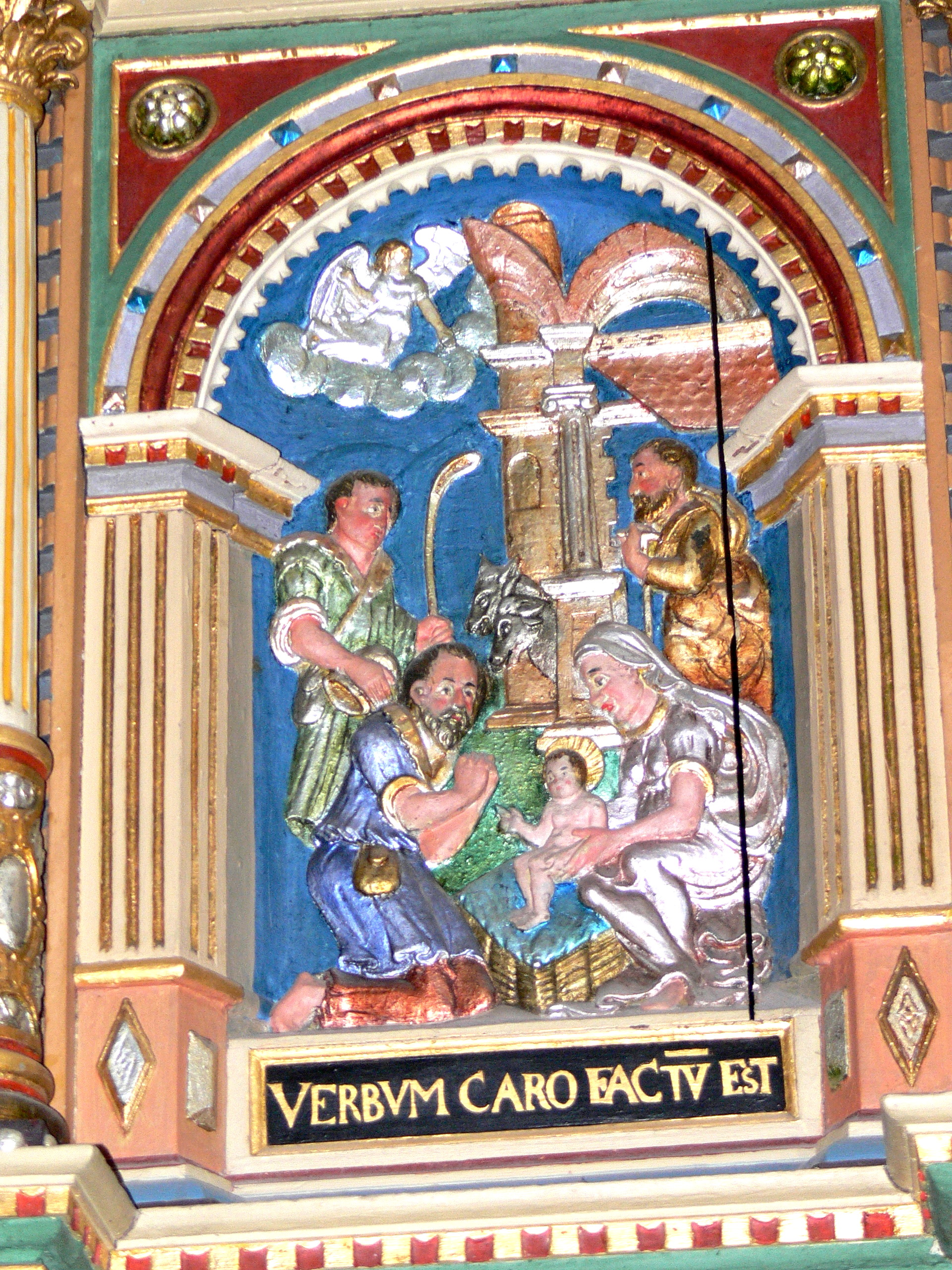
- The Latin inscription "Verbum Caro Factum Est" meaning "the Word was made flesh" taken from John 1:14 at the pulpit of Ribe Cathedral (1597)
- Book: Gospel of John
- Christian Bible part: New Testament

John 1:14 is the fourteenth verse in the first chapter of the Gospel of John in the New Testament of the Christian Bible. It asserts that "the word became flesh".

== Content ==
In the original Greek according to Westcott-Hort, this verse is:

Καὶ ὁ λόγος σὰρξ ἐγένετο, καὶ ἐσκήνωσεν ἐν ἡμῖν — καὶ ἐθεασάμεθα τὴν δόξαν αὐτοῦ, δόξαν ὡς μονογενοῦς παρὰ πατρός — πλήρης χάριτος καὶ ἀληθείας.

In the King James Version of the Bible, the text reads:

And the Word was made flesh, and dwelt among us, (and we beheld his glory, the glory as of the only begotten of the Father,) full of grace and truth.

The New International Version translates the passage as:

The Word became flesh and made his dwelling among us. We have seen his glory, the glory of the One and Only, who came from the Father, full of grace and truth.

== Analysis ==
Theologian René Kieffer records that "the evangelist finally shows how the Word become flesh has revealed the Father", while Eric Huntsman suggests that a single phrase in this verse, "and the Word was made flesh", can "take the place of the infancy narratives of Matthew 1–2 and Luke 1–2".

Kieffer contrasts the "carnal will" mentioned in verse 13 with the term logos (λόγος; "the Word") introduced in verse 1. It is combined with the concrete term sarx (σὰρξ; "flesh") probably to refute Docetic views (which believe Jesus as only an 'appearance') as in John's letters (1 John 1:2-3:4:2; 2 John 7).

D. A. Carson observes that the incarnation is here "articulated in the boldest way": had the evangelist written only that the Word assumed manhood or adopted a body, a reader steeped in Hellenistic dualism "might have missed the point", but "the Word became flesh" is unambiguous, "almost shocking". Carson and Craig Keener both note a deliberate verbal contrast within the prologue: whereas the Word simply "was" (ἦν) "in the beginning" (1:1), he "became" (ἐγένετο) flesh in verse 14; the change of verb marks the entry of the eternal Word into history as an event, over against his timeless existence with God.

The word "flesh" denotes "human nature" (as opposed to the "divine") or "material nature" (as opposed to the "spiritual"), and is used here rather than "body," because it could be confused with "spiritual body" (cf. 1 Corinthians 15:40-44), nor rendered as "man" (cf. John 5:27; John 8:40), who has "body" and "spirit". Methodist writer Joseph Benson emphasizes sarx as referring to "the whole human nature", citing Bishop Horne that “as the Divinity is an object by no means within the grasp of the human understanding, it were absurd to expect an adequate idea of the mode of its union with flesh, expressed in the text by the word "made" (εγενετο, egeneto)," although it suffices to maintain the 'general truth' against "four capital errors" on the point of the incarnation, proposed in different ways by (1) Arius (denying Jesus to be truly God, because he became man); (2) Apollinaris, (stating Jesus was not really man, because he was also God); (3) Nestorius (dividing Jesus into two persons); (4) Eutyches (confounding two natures into one person of Jesus) in opposition to which, the four ancient general church councils of Nicaea, Constantinople, Ephesus, and Chalcedon were called.

'Dwelt among us' (literally 'put up his tent among us') is used in Wisdom of Sirach 24:10. The Greek word for 'dwelt' (ἐσκήνωσεν; "eskēnōsen") also means "tabernacled, sojourned", with a similar sound to "Shekhînah", a term frequently occurring in the Targums or Chaldee Paraphrases, as the 'visible symbol of the divine Presence which appeared in the Tabernacle and the Temple'; the Targums identify the Shekhînah with the "Memra" or "Word". Carson accepts the allusion to the skēnē (Tabernacle) as secure, but regards the further identification of the incarnate Word with the shekhînah as "less than certain, since it depends on some knowledge of Hebrew", whereas elsewhere the evangelist appears to assume his readers have none, glossing Semitic terms for them (cf. John 1:38, 41, 42; 9:7; 20:16). He notes that the cognate Hebrew verb šākan ("to dwell") and the noun miškān ("tabernacle") underlie the post-biblical term shekhînah, "the glory of God who made himself present in the tabernacle and the temple". The presence of the Word in the flesh replaces the Second Temple which replaced the tabernacle as a dwelling place for God, to represent God's Wisdom in Israel. The first-person ‘we’ refers to the individuals Jesus lived with, implying that the narrator witnessed Jesus in the flesh. Keener sets this eyewitness claim within a Sinai typology: the "we" who "beheld his glory" (ἐθεασάμεθα) recall Moses, who beheld God's glory on the mountain (Exodus 33–34). On Keener's reading the parallel is inverted from the common "Jesus as the new Moses" motif: it is Jesus's disciples who stand in the place of Moses, while Jesus corresponds to the divine glory that Moses witnessed; the apostolic eyewitnesses thus mediate a revelation greater than, but analogous to, the one given at Sinai (cf. 2 Corinthians 3). Carson similarly holds that the "we" who saw the Word's glory "must refer to the Evangelist and other Christians who actually saw Jesus in the days of his earthly life".

The Word's glory is dependent on the Father's presence in his monogenes Son (cf. John 17:5); monogenes (μονογενοῦς, monogenous), meaning 'only', 'unique', 'precious' (cf. Hebrew 11:17 about Isaac), or 'born from the one', used four times in the Gospel of John (1:14,18; 3:16, 18), and once in 1 John 4:9 to demonstrate the 'very special relationship between Jesus and his Father'. The expression 'full of grace and truth' is best connected with 'only son', rather than with 'glory', to reflect God's revelation to Moses as 'merciful and gracious' (Exodus 34:6), that is, 'full of loving initiative and of fidelity', so 'in the "Word made flesh" humanity can meet God's glory'. Carson and Keener both note that the phrase "full of grace and truth" renders the Hebrew pairing חֶסֶד וֶאֱמֶת (ḥeseḏ we-ʾemeṯ, "covenant-love and faithfulness") of Exodus 34:6, but departs from its usual Septuagint equivalent eleos kai alētheia (ἔλεος καὶ ἀλήθεια): the noun charis (χάρις, "grace") renders ḥeseḏ only once in the Septuagint (Esther 2:9). Both suggest that John, or the source of his prologue, was translating directly from the Hebrew while still expecting his readers to recognize the words as an echo of Scripture.

"The Word was made flesh" was a pivotal verse for the Council of Chalcedon where it was hotly debated whether Christ had one or two natures or wills, the one being divine and the other human. Lapide explains it as, "not in the way in which water became wine when it was changed into wine, nor as food becomes our flesh, when it is changed into it, nor yet again as gold becomes a statue, by the addition to the material of gold of the accidental form of a statue, but after a similar manner to that in which soul and flesh being united become one man." Athanasius therefore states in his Creed: "One, not by confusion of substance, but by unity of Person. For as the reasonable soul and flesh is one man, so God and man is one Christ." The New Annotated Oxford Bible notes in this verse that 'Jesus was fully human (the Word became flesh) and fully involved in human society (and lived among us)'.

Keener reads verses 14–18 as a single unit modelled on the Sinai theophany of Exodus 33–34, in which God, giving the Torah a second time, revealed his character to Moses. On this "new Sinai" reading the Word "tabernacles" among his people, his glory is beheld and testified to by eyewitnesses as Moses testified at Sinai, and the "grace and truth" that Moses glimpsed only in part (for "Moses saw only part of God's glory", Exodus 33:20–23; cf. John 1:18) is now revealed in full in the enfleshed Word. Keener adds that although Jesus's glory appears in his signs, for the Fourth Gospel it is disclosed most fully in his death and exaltation, so that the cross becomes the fullest revelation of the divine "grace and truth" shown to Moses.

== Commentary from the Church Fathers ==
Thomas Aquinas assembled the following quotations regarding this verse from the early Fathers of the Church:

- Augustine: "Having said, Born of God; to prevent surprise and trepidation at so great, so apparently incredible a grace, as that men should be born of God; to assure us, he says, And the Word was made flesh. Why marvellest thou then that men are born of God? Know that God Himself was born of man."
- Augustine: "As our world becomes the bodily voice, by its assumption of that voice, as a means of developing itself externally; so the Word of God was made flesh, by assuming flesh, as a means of manifesting Itself to the world. And as our word is made voice, yet is not turned into voice; so the Word of God was made flesh, but never turned into flesh. It is by assuming another nature, not by consuming themselves in it, that our word is made voice, and the Word, flesh."
- Augustine: "If men are disturbed however by its being said that the Word was made flesh, without mention of a soul; let them know that the flesh is put for the whole man, the part for the whole, by a figure of speech; as in the Psalms, Unto thee shall all flesh come; (Ps. 65:2) and again in Romans, By the deeds of the law there shall no flesh be justified. (Rom. 3:20) In the same sense it is said here that the Word was made flesh; meaning that the Word was made man."
- Augustine: "Or thus; in that the Word was made flesh and dwelt among us, His birth became a kind of ointment to anoint the eyes of our heart, that we might through His humanity discern His majesty; and therefore it follows, And we saw His glory. No one could see His glory, who was not healed by the humility of the flesh. For there had flown upon man’s eye as it were dust from the earth: the eye had been diseased, and earth was sent to heal it again; the flesh had blinded thee, the flesh restores thee. The soul by consenting to carnal affections had become carnal; hence the eye of the mind had been blinded: then the physician made for thee ointment. He came in such wise, as that by the flesh He destroyed the corruption of the flesh. And thus the Word was made flesh, that thou mightest be able to say, We saw His glory."
- Chrysostom: "Or thus, After saying that they were born of God, who received Him, he sets forth the cause of this honour, viz. the Word being made flesh, God’s own Son was made the son of man, that he might make the sons of men the sons of God. Now when thou hearest that the Word was made flesh, be not disturbed, for He did not change His substance into flesh, which it were indeed impious to suppose; but remaining what He was, took upon Him the form of a servant. But as there are some who say, that the whole of the incarnation was only in appearance, to refute such a blasphemy, he used the expression, was made, meaning to represent not a conversion of substance, but an assumption of real flesh. But if they say, God is omnipotent; why then could He not be changed into flesh? we reply, that a change from an unchangeable nature is a contradiction."
- Chrysostom: "Lest from it being said, however, that the Word was made flesh, you should infer improperly a change of His incorruptible nature, he subjoins, And dwelt among us. For that which inhabits is not the same, but different from the habitation: different, I say, in nature; though as to union and conjunction, God the Word and the flesh are one, without confusion or extinction of substance."
- Chrysostom: "He subjoins, As of the Only-Begotten of the Father: for many prophets, as Moses, Elijah, and others, workers of miracles, had been glorified, and Angels also who appeared unto men, shining with the brightness belonging to their nature; Cherubim and Seraphim too, who were seen in glorious array by the prophets. But the Evangelist withdrawing our minds from these, and raising them above all nature, and every preeminence of fellow servants, leads us up to the summit Himself; as if he said, Not of prophet, or of any other man, or of Angel, or Archangel, or any of the higher powers, is the glory which we beheld; but as that of the very Lord, very King, very and true Only-Begotten Son."
- Chrysostom: "Having said that we are made the sons of God, and in no other way than because the Word was made flesh; he mentions another gift, And we saw His glory. Which glory we should not have seen, had He not, by His alliance with humanity, become visible to us. For if they could not endure to look on the glorified face of Moses, but there was need of a veil, how could soiled and earthly creatures, like ourselves, have borne the sight of undisguised Divinity, which is not vouchsafed even to the higher powers themselves."
- Council of Ephesus: "The discourse which we utter, which we use in conversation with each other, is incorporeal, imperceptible, impalpable; but clothed in letters and characters, it becomes material, perceptible, tangible. So too the Word of God, which was naturally invisible, becomes visible, and that comes before us in tangible form, which was by nature incorporeal."
- Alcuin: "(in Joan. 1:1.) When we think how the incorporeal soul is joined to the body, so as that of two is made one man, we too shall the more easily receive the notion of the incorporeal Divine substance being joined to the soul in the body, in unity of person; so as that the Word is not turned into flesh, nor the flesh into the Word; just as the soul is not turned into body, nor the body into soul."
- Alcuin: " Or, dwelt among us, means, lived amongst men."
- Theophylact of Ohrid: "Apollinarius of Laodicea raised a heresy upon this text; saying, that Christ had flesh only, not a rational soul; in the place of which His divinity directed and controlled His body."
- Theophylact of Ohrid: "The Evangelist intends by making mention of the flesh, to show the unspeakable condescension of God, and lead us to admire His compassion, in assuming for our salvation, what was so opposite and incongenial to His nature, as the flesh: for the soul has some propinquity to God. If the Word, however, was made flesh, and assumed not at the same time a human soul, our souls, it would follow, would not be yet restored: for what He did not assume, He could not sanctify. What a mockery then, when the soul first sinned, to assume and sanctify the flesh only, leaving the weakest part untouched! This text overthrows Nestorius, who asserted that it was not the very Word, even God, Who the Self-same was made man, being conceived of the sacred blood of the Virgin: but that the Virgin brought forth a man endowed with every kind of virtue, and that the Word of God was united to him: thus making out two sons, one born of the Virgin, i. e. man, the other born of God, that is, the Son of God, united to that man by grace, and relation, and lover. In opposition to him the Evangelist declares, that the very Word was made Man, not that the Word fixing upon a righteous man united Himself to him."
- Theophylact of Ohrid: "Or, full of grace, inasmuch as His word was gracious, as saith David, Full of grace are thy lips; and truth, (Ps. 45:3) because what Moses and the Prophets spoke or did in figure, Christ did in reality."
- Theophylact of Ohrid: "From the text, The Word was made flesh, we learn this farther, that the Word Itself is man, and being the Son of God was made the Son of a woman, who is rightly called the Mother of God, as having given birth to God in the flesh."
- Gregory the Great: "In Scripture language as, and as it were, are sometimes put not for likeness but reality; whence the expression, As of the Only-Begotten of the Father."
- Cyril of Alexandria: "The Word uniting to Himself a body of flesh animated with a rational soul, substantially, was ineffably and incomprehensibly made Man, and called the Son of man, and that not according to the will only, or good-pleasure, nor again by the assumption of the Person alone. The natures are different indeed which are brought into true union, but He Who is of both, Christ the Son, is One; the difference of the natures, on the other hand, not being destroyed in consequence of this coalition."
- Origen: "Full of grace and truth. Of this the meaning is twofold. For it may be understood of the Humanity, and the Divinity of the Incarnate Word, so that the fulness of grace has reference to the Humanity, according to which Christ is the Head of the Church, and the first-born of every creature: for the greatest and original example of grace, by which man, with no preceding merits, is made God, is manifested primarily in Him. The fulness of the grace of Christ may also be understood of the Holy Spirit, whose sevenfold operation filled Christ’s Humanity. (Is. 11:2) The fulness of truth applies to the Divinity … But if you had rather understand the fulness of grace and truth of the New Testament, you may with propriety pronounce the fulness of the grace of the New Testament to be given by Christ, and the truth of the legal types to have been fulfilled in Him."

== Sources ==
- Coogan, Michael David (2007). Coogan, Michael David; Brettler, Marc Zvi; Newsom, Carol Ann; Perkins, Pheme (eds.). The New Oxford Annotated Bible with the Apocryphal/Deuterocanonical Books: New Revised Standard Version, Issue 48 (Augmented 3rd ed.). Oxford University Press. ISBN 9780195288810.
- Kieffer, René (2007). "60. John". In Barton, John; Muddiman, John (eds.). The Oxford Bible Commentary (first (paperback) ed.). Oxford University Press. pp. 960–1000. ISBN 978-0199277186.

Preceded by John 1:13	Gospel of John; Chapter 1	Succeeded by John 1:15
