= John 1:17 =

- ← 1:16 1:18 →
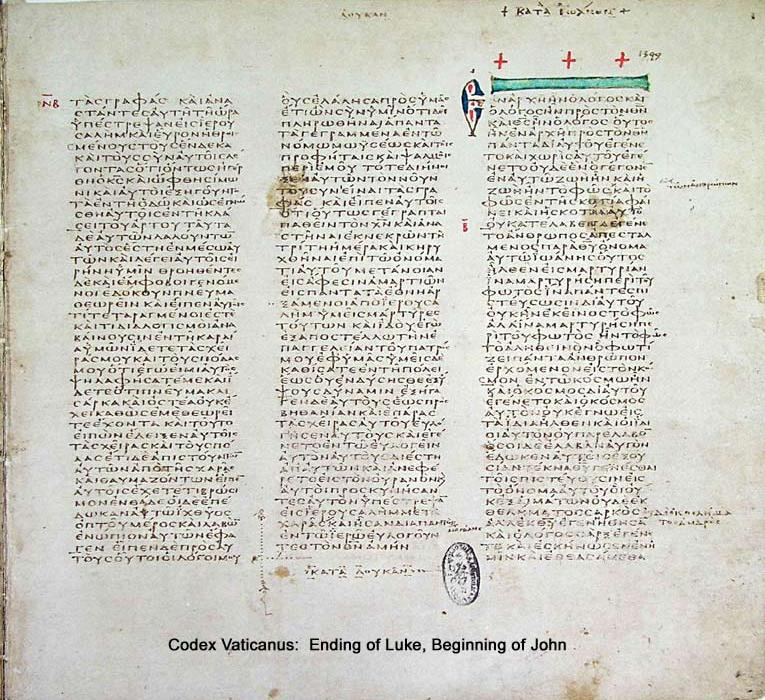
- Beginning of Gospel of John (and the end of Gospel of Luke) in Codex Vaticanus (4th century)
- Book: Gospel of John
- Christian Bible part: New Testament

John 1:17 is the seventeenth verse in the first chapter of the Gospel of John in the New Testament of the Christian Bible.

== Content ==
In the original Greek according to Westcott-Hort, this verse is:

Ὅτι ὁ νόμος διὰ Μωσέως ἐδόθη, ἡ χάρις καὶ ἡ ἀλήθεια διὰ Ἰησοῦ Χριστοῦ ἐγένετο.

In the King James Version of the Bible, the text reads:

For the law was given by Moses, but grace and truth came by Jesus Christ.

The New International Version translates the passage as:

For the law was given through Moses; grace and truth came through Jesus Christ.

== Analysis ==
The two clauses of the verse use different verbs. The Law "was given" (ἐδόθη, edothē), which Craig Keener reads as a divine passive: God is the giver and Moses the mediator, a point on which he notes most ancient Jewish sources agree. Grace and truth, by contrast, "came" or "came to be" (ἐγένετο, egeneto). D. A. Carson takes the change of verb to be intentional, following R. V. G. Tasker's remark that "the grace and truth which came by Jesus Christ can never be dissociated from Himself", where the Law could be treated as separable from the one through whom it was given.

The Greek text places the two clauses side by side with no conjunction between them; the "but" of the King James Version is supplied by the translators and is absent from the Greek. Carson observes that nothing in the wording requires an antithesis, and that the sentence reads equally well as a comparison: "just as the law was given through Moses, so grace and truth came through Jesus Christ", the Law itself being understood as an earlier gift of grace. He cites Barnabas Lindars and Joachim Jeremias for this reading. Keener agrees that the lack of an adversative "does not eliminate the contrast" but "does not permit us to exaggerate" it, comparing a saying in the Mishnah tractate Avot (2:7) that likewise sets a good thing against a better one without a conjunction; on his reading verse 17 contrasts "something good and something better, which are not mutually exclusive".

Keener characterizes the difference between the two as "one of intensity more than of quality": the character of grace and truth was genuinely revealed in the giving of the Law (Exodus 34:6), but was made fully available through Christ, who is the Law's full embodiment. On this view the Fourth Gospel does not oppose the Torah or deny that grace and truth may be found in it; it identifies that grace and truth with Jesus.

While accepting the Mosaic origin of the Law, Keener argues that the verse subordinates Moses: Christ, not Moses, is presented as the mediator of the divine character to which the Law bore witness. Across the Fourth Gospel Moses and the Law testify to Jesus (John 1:45; John 5:45–47), so that opponents who appeal to Moses against Jesus are said to misunderstand the Law they invoke (John 7:19; John 9:28–29).

Cornelius a Lapide points out that the Mosaic Law was threefold, comprising moral, judicial, and ceremonial law. The first two require grace to be observed. The effect of grace is one could fulfil the same law from love to God, and so deserve eternal life. However, the ceremonial law opposes truth, for the ceremonies were only types and shadows of Christ and His sacraments. René Kieffer distinguishes John's treatment of the Mosaic Law, here, from Paul's frequent diminution of the value of the Law: for John, "grace and truth" are of higher value and serve to "fulfil the former revelation". The Pontifical Biblical Commission also comments that John's Gospel values "the Jewish patrimony" inherited by the Christian faith: this verse shows that "the Law is a gift given through Moses as intermediary".

Carson notes that verse 17 is the first place in the Gospel where the name "Jesus Christ" appears, naming the human who is identified with the Word made flesh of the prologue.

== Commentary from the Church Fathers ==
Thomas Aquinas assembled the following quotations regarding this verse from the early Fathers of the Church:

- Chrysostom: "Or we have received grace for grace; that is, the new in the place of the old. For as there is a justice and a justice besides, an adoption and another adoption, a circumcision and another circumcision; so is there a grace and another grace: only the one being a type, the other a reality. He brings in the words to show that the Jews as well as ourselves are saved by grace: it being of mercy and grace that they received the law. Next, after he has said, Grace for grace, he adds something to show the magnitude of the gift; For the law was given by Moses, but grace and truth were made by Jesus Christ. John when comparing himself with Christ above had said, He is preferred before me: but the Evangelist draws a comparison between Christ, and one much more in admiration with the Jews than John, viz. Moses. And observe his wisdom. He does not draw the comparison between the persons, but the things, contrasting grace and truth to the law: the latter of which he says was given, a word only applying to an administrator; the former made, as we should speak of a king, who does everything by his power: though in this King it would be with grace also, because that with power He remitted all sins. Now His grace is shown in His gift of Baptism, and our adoption by the Holy Spirit, and many other things; but to have a better insight into what the truth is, we should study the figures of the old law: for what was to be accomplished in the New Testament, is prefigured in the Old, Christ at His Coming filling up the figure. Thus was the figure given by Moses, but the truth made by Christ."
- Augustine: "Or, we may refer grace to knowledge, truth to wisdom. Amongst the events of time the highest grace is the uniting of man to God in One Person; in the eternal world the highest truth pertains to God the Word."

== In popular culture ==
- In the Halo video game franchise, the game's protagonist Master Chief's real name is John-117, a possible reference to the Biblical verse.

Preceded by John 1:16	Gospel of John; Chapter 1	Succeeded by John 1:18
