= John 1:18 =

- ← 1:17 1:19 →
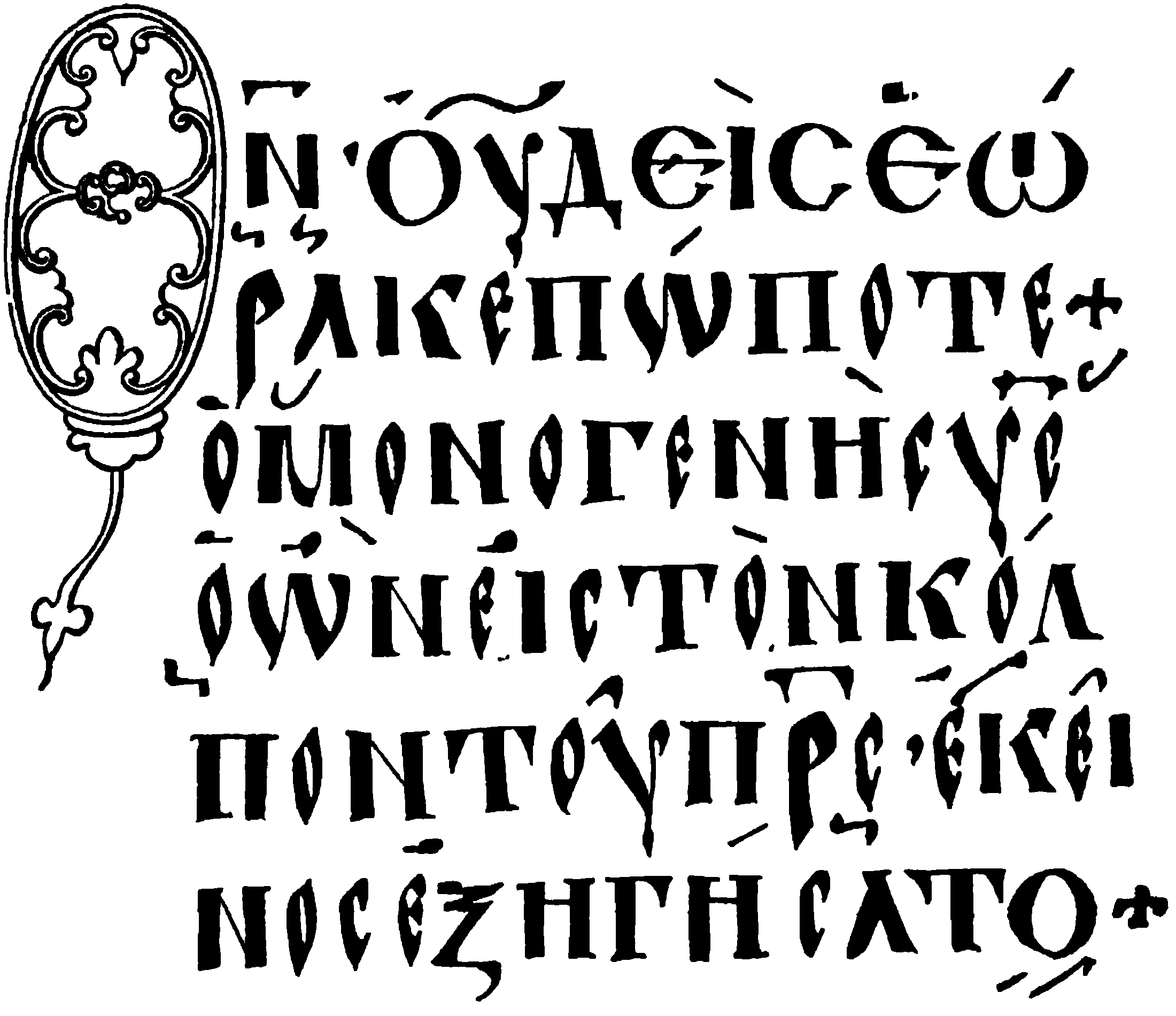
- John 1:18-20 in Codex Harcleianus (Lectionary 150) from 995 AD.
- Book: Gospel of John
- Christian Bible part: New Testament

John 1:18 is the eighteenth verse in the first chapter of the Gospel of John in the New Testament of the Christian Bible. This verse concludes the prologue to the Gospel of John, which is also called the "Hymn to the Word". Its message recalls verse 1, asserting that there is no other possibility for humans to know God except through Jesus Christ.

== Content ==
In the original Greek according to Westcott-Hort, this verse is:

Θεὸν οὐδεὶς ἑώρακε πώποτε· ὁ μονογενὴς θεὸς, ὁ ὢν εἰς τὸν κόλπον τοῦ πατρός, ἐκεῖνος ἐξηγήσατο.

Note that the Greek word for "son" (υιός, huios) is not actually found in this text, but it does appear in Stephanus' 1550 text:

θεον ουδεις εωρακεν πωποτε ο μονογενης υιος ο ων εις τον κολπον του πατρος εκεινος εξηγησατο.

In the King James Version of the Bible, the text reads:

No man hath seen God at any time; the only begotten Son, which is in the bosom of the Father, he hath declared him.

The New International Version translates the passage as:

No one has ever seen God, but the one and only Son, who is himself God and is in closest relationship with the Father, has made him known.

In the Good News Translation of the Bible, the text reads:

No one has ever seen God. The only Son, who is the same as God and is at the Father's side, he has made him known.

== Analysis ==
=== Textual variant ===
The Greek manuscripts divide over the description of the one who makes God known. The earliest witnesses read μονογενὴς θεός (monogenēs theos), "the only God" or "the unique one, himself God", while a large body of later manuscripts reads ὁ μονογενὴς υἱός (ho monogenēs huios), "the only Son" or, in older English, "the only begotten Son", the reading behind the King James Version. Craig Keener notes that μονογενὴς θεός has in its favour most of the earliest manuscripts, including Papyrus 66 (2nd or 3rd century) and Papyrus 75 (3rd century), Codex Sinaiticus and Codex Vaticanus (both 4th century), with Codex Alexandrinus (5th century) on the other side. D. A. Carson judges μονογενὴς θεός to be the earlier reading, reasoning that "only Son" is so common an expression in John (John 3:16, John 3:18) that a copyist would have been far more likely to change the unusual "God" into the familiar "Son" than the reverse. The choice bears on whether the verse is read as an explicit affirmation of the divinity of Jesus.

=== "No-one has ever seen God" ===
The opening clause, "No one has ever seen God", restates a settled assumption of the Old Testament that a sinful human being cannot see God and live (Exodus 33:20, Deuteronomy 4:12). Carson connects it with the immediately preceding reference to Moses: even in the episode where Moses saw the Lord's glory, he was not himself permitted to see God, and the apparent exceptions elsewhere in the Old Testament are always qualified in some way. On this reading the verse contrasts that limited vision with the Son, who alone has seen the Father and can therefore make him known (John 6:46).

By the verse "No man hath seen God", Robert Witham believes it means that no mortal in this life has ever had a perfect union and enjoyment of God, and that no one can perfectly comprehend his infinite greatness, except the only-begotten divine Son who is with the Father. For as Christ said, (John 14:11) "I am in the Father, and the Father in me."

Henry Alford reads this verse closely with the preceding verse: For the law was given through Moses; grace and truth came through Jesus Christ. He writes that "Moses could not give out of the πλήρωμα (pleroma) of grace and truth, for he had no immediate sight of God, and no man can have".

=== Inclusio of John 1:18 with John 1:1 ===
Both Carson and Keener read verse 18 as the close of an inclusio with John 1:1: the Word who was "with God" and "was God" is answered by the only Son who is "at the Father's side" and is himself God, so that the prologue opens and closes on the deity of the Word. Keener adds that the same affirmation frames the Gospel as a whole, since verse 18 corresponds to Thomas's confession "My Lord and my God" at John 20:28.

=== "At the Father's Side" ===
The phrase rendered "at the Father's side" is more literally "in the bosom of the Father" (εἰς τὸν κόλπον τοῦ πατρός). Carson observes that the same idiom appears where Lazarus is in Abraham's bosom (Luke 16:22–23) and where the beloved disciple leans on Jesus' bosom at the last supper (John 13:23), and that it conveys intimacy, mutual love, and knowledge. Pope Francis links τον κολπον του πατρος (ton kolpon tou patros) with the "heart of the Father", in his encyclical letter On the Human and Divine Love of the Human Heart of Jesus (Dilexit nos).

The final verb, ἐξηγήσατο (exēgēsato), from which the English word "exegesis" derives, elsewhere in the New Testament means to recount or narrate a matter (Luke 24:35, Acts 15:12). Carson writes that in this sense the incarnate Word is the "narration" or exegesis of God, the Son who makes God's own character known. Keener similarly holds that the term implies more than communicating a visual image, since it presents Jesus as the one who fully interprets God.

== Commentary from the Church Fathers ==
Thomas Aquinas assembled the following quotations regarding this verse from the early Fathers of the Church:

- Chrysostom: "Or thus; the Evangelist after showing the great superiority of Christ's gifts, compared with those dispensed by Moses, wishes in the next place to supply an adequate reason for the difference. The one being a servant was made a minister of a lesser dispensation: but the other Who was Lord, and Son of the King, brought us far higher things, being ever coexistent with the Father, and beholding Him. Then follows, No man hath seen God at any time, &c."
- Chrysostom: "If the old fathers had seen That very Nature, they would not have contemplated It so variously, for It is in Itself simple and without shape; It sits not, It walks not; these are the qualities of bodies. Whence he saith through the Prophet, I have multiplied visions, and used similitudes, by the ministry of the Prophets: (Hosea 12:10) i.e. I have condescended to them, I appeared that which I was not. For inasmuch as the Son of God was about to manifest Himself to us in actual flesh, men were at first raised to the sight of God, in such ways as allowed of their seeing Him."
- Chrysostom: "In this complete sense only the Son and the Holy Ghost see the Father. For how can created nature see that which is uncreated? So then no man knoweth the Father as the Son knoweth Him: and hence what follows, The Only-Begotten Son, Who is in the bosom of the Father, He hath declared Him. That we might not be led by the identity of the name, to confound Him with the sons made so by grace, the article is annexed in the first place; and then, to put an end to all doubt, the name Only-Begotten is introduced."
- Chrysostom: "That very existence which is God, neither Prophets, nor even Angels, nor yet Archangels, have seen. For enquire of the Angels; they say nothing concerning His Substance; but sing, Glory to God in the highest, and Peace on earth to men of good will. (Luke 2:14) Nay, ask even Cherubim and Seraphim; thou wilt hear only in reply the mystic melody of devotion, and that heaven and earth are full of His glory. (Is. 6:3)"
- Chrysostom: "He adds, Which is in the bosom of the Father. To dwell in the bosom is much more than simply to see. For he who sees simply, hath not the knowledge thoroughly of that which he sees; but he who dwells in the bosom, knoweth every thing. When you hear then that no one knoweth the Father save the Son, do not by any means suppose that he only knows the Father more than any other, and does not know Him fully. For the Evangelist sets forth His residing in the bosom of the Father on this very account: viz. to show us the intimate converse of the Only-Begotten, and His coeternity with the Father."
- Chrysostom: "But what hath He declared? That God is one. But this the rest of the Prophets and Moses proclaim: what else have we learnt from the Son Who was in the bosom of the Father? In the first place, that those very truths, which the others declared, were declared through the operation of the Only Begotten: in the next place, we have received a far greater doctrine from the Only Begotten; viz. that God is a Spirit, and those who worship Him must worship Him in spirit and in truth; and that God is the Father of the Only Begotten."
- Chrysostom: "The text then, No man hath seen God at any time, applies not to the Father only, but also to the Son: for He, as Paul saith, is the Image of the invisible God; but He who is the Image of the Invisible, must Himself also be invisible."
- Gregory the Great: "It is plainly given us to understand here, that while we are in this mortal state, we can see God only through the medium of certain images, not in the reality of His own nature. A soul influenced by the grace of the Spirit may see God through certain figures, but cannot penetrate into his absolute essence. And hence it is that Jacob, who testifies that he saw God, saw nothing but an Angel: and that Moses, who talked with God face to face, says, Shew me Thy way, that I may know Thee: (Exodus 33:13) meaning that he ardently desired to see in the brightness of His own infinite Nature, Him Whom he had only as yet seen reflected in images."
- Gregory the Great: "If however any, while inhabiting this corruptible flesh, can advance to such an immeasurable height of virtue, as to be able to discern by the contemplative vision, the eternal brightness of God, their case affects not what we say. For whoever seeth wisdom, that is, God, is dead wholly to this life, being no longer occupied by the love of it."
- Gregory the Great: "Some hold that in the place of bliss, God is visible in His brightness, but not in His nature. This is to indulge in over much subtlety. For in that simple and unchangeable essence, no division can be made between the nature and the brightness."
- Gregory the Great: "Some however there are who conceive that not even the Angels see God."
- Augustine: "What is that then which Jacob said, I have seen God face to face; and that which is written of Moses, he talked with God face to face; and that which the prophet Isaiah saith of himself, I saw the Lord sitting upon a throne?" (Epistle 147 to Paulina)
- Augustine: "Now it is said, Blessed are the pure in heart, for they shall see God; (Matthew 5:8) and again, When He shall appear, we shall be like unto Him, for we shall see Him as He is. (1 John 3:2) What is the meaning then of the words here: No man hath seen God at any time? The reply is easy: those passages speak of God, as to be seen, not as already seen. They shall see God, it is said, not, they have seen Him: nor is it, we have seen Him, but, we shall see Him as He is. For, No man hath seen God at any time, neither in this life, nor yet in the Angelic, as He is; in the same way in which sensible things are perceived by the bodily vision."
- Augustine: "For unless any in some sense die to this life, either by leaving the body altogether, or by being so withdrawn and alienated from carnal perceptions, that he may well not know, as the Apostle says, whether he be in the body or out of the body, (2 Corinthians 12:2) he cannot be carried away, and borne aloft to that vision."
- Augustine: "If we say, that the text, No one hath seen God at any time (1 Timothy 6:16), applies only to men; so that, as the Apostle more plainly interprets it, Whom no man hath seen nor can see, no one is to be understood here to mean, no one of men: the question may be solved in a way not to contradict what our Lord says, Their Angels do always behold the face of My Father; (Matthew 18:10) so that we must believe that Angels see, what no one, i.e. of men, hath ever seen."
- Augustine: "In the bosom of the Father, i.e. in the secret Presence of the Father: for God hath not the fold on the bosom, as we have; nor must be imagined to sit, as we do; nor is He bound with a girdle, so as to have a fold: but from the fact of our bosom being placed innermost, the secret Presence of the Father is called the bosom of the Father. He then who, in the secret Presence of the Father, knew the Father, the same hath declared what He saw."
- Augustine: "Which indeed is true so far, that no bodily or even mental vision of man hath ever embraced the fulness of God; for it is one thing to see, another to embrace the whole of what thou seest. A thing is seen, if only the sight of it be caught; but we only see a thing fully, when we have no part of it unseen, when we see round its extreme limits."
- Augustine: "Yet have there been men, who, deceived by the vanity of their hearts, maintained that the Father is invisible, the Son visible. Now if they call the Son visible, with respect to His connexion with the flesh, we object not; it is the Catholic doctrine. But it is madness in them to say He was so before His incarnation; i.e. if it be true that Christ is the Wisdom of God, and the Power of God. The Wisdom of God cannot be seen by the eye. If the human word cannot be seen by the eye, how can the Word of God?"
- Hilary of Poitiers: "The Truth of His Nature did not seem sufficiently explained by the name of Son, unless, in addition, its peculiar force as proper to Him were expressed, so signifying its distinctness from all beside. For in that, besides Son, he calleth Him also the Only-Begotten, he cut off altogether all suspicion of adoption, the Nature of the Only-Begotten guaranteeing the truth of the name."
- Bede: "Farther, if the word declared have reference to the past, it must be considered that He, being made man, declared the doctrine of the Trinity in unity, and how, and by what acts we should prepare ourselves for the contemplation of it. If it have reference to the future, then it means that He will declare Him, when He shall introduce His elect to the vision of His brightness."

== Sources ==
- Guthrie, Donald (1994). "John". In Carson, D. A.; France, R. T.; Motyer, J. A.; Wenham, G. J. (eds.). New Bible Commentary: 21st Century Edition (4, illustrated, reprint, revised ed.). Inter-Varsity Press. pp. 1021–1065. ISBN 9780851106489.

Preceded by John 1:17	Gospel of John; Chapter 1	Succeeded by John 1:19
