= John 1:13 =

- ← 1:12 1:14 →
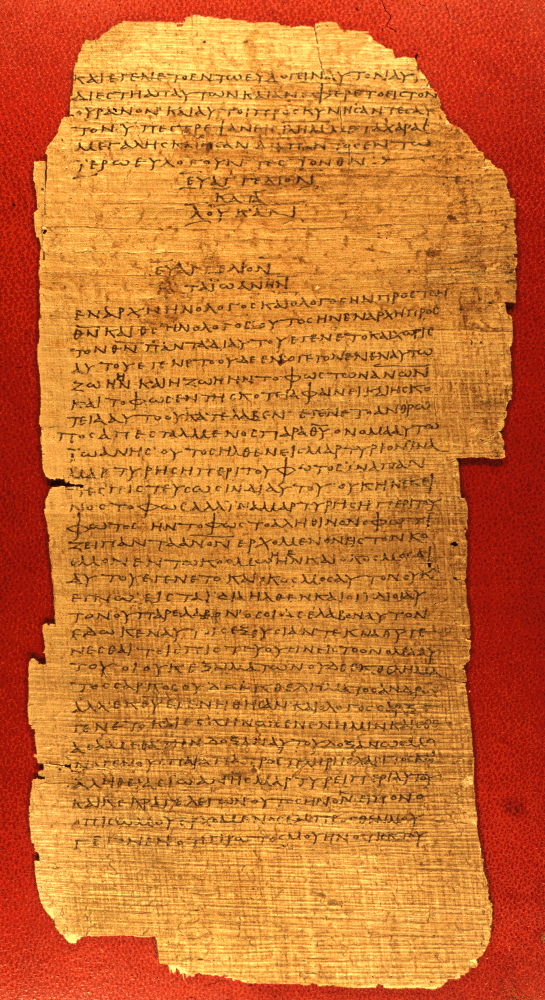
- John 1:1–16 in Papyrus 75 (AD 175–225)
- Book: Gospel of John
- Christian Bible part: New Testament

John 1:13 is the thirteenth verse in the first chapter of the Gospel of John in the New Testament of the Christian Bible.

== Content ==
In the original Greek according to Westcott-Hort, this verse is:

οἳ οὐκ ἐξ αἱμάτων, οὐδὲ ἐκ θελήματος σαρκός, οὐδὲ ἐκ θελήματος ἀνδρός, ἀλλ᾿ ἐκ Θεοῦ ἐγεννήθησαν.

In the King James Version of the Bible, the text reads:

Which were born, not of blood, nor of the will of the flesh, nor of the will of man, but of God.

The New International Version translates the passage as:

children born not of natural descent, nor of human decision or a husband's will, but born of God.

The Concordant Literal New Testament records the word "bloods" as a plural.

== Textual variant ==
The relative clause is plural in every known Greek manuscript (οἳ ... ἐγεννήθησαν, "who were born"), so that the new birth described is that of believers. A minority of witnesses, however, read a singular verb (ὃς ... ἐγεννήθη, "who was born"), which refers the clause to Jesus and would make the verse a statement of his virginal conception and birth: "to those who believe in the name of him who was born, not of blood ...". D. A. Carson notes that this singular reading is found in the Old Latin and some Syriac manuscripts and is followed by the Jerusalem Bible, and that it has been defended as original by a number of, mostly Roman Catholic, scholars, among them Jules Galot and Matthew Vellanickal.

Carson nonetheless regards the plural as original, observing that no Greek manuscript supports the singular and that copyists could readily have moved from the plural to the singular by an a fortiori argument (if Christians are born of God, how much more is Christ), whereas a change in the other direction is hard to explain; he follows Bruce M. Metzger in this judgement.

== Analysis ==
The opening word of this verse, οἳ (oi: "which", "who", or "they") continues from the previous verse. Protestant theologian Heinrich Meyer notes that it picks up the reference to "children of God" in verse 12, not the reference there to "those who believed", continuing

The conception "children of God" is more precisely defined as denoting those who came into existence not after the manner of natural human generation, but who were begotten of God. The negative statement exhibits them as those in whose coming into existence human generation (and consequently also Abrahamic descent) has no part whatever.

According to Cornelius à Lapide, "John here gives an antithesis between human generation and Divine, and demonstrates the superiority of the latter. For he says that the former is of bloods (αἱμάτων, aimatōn), which is a Hebraism for blood, meaning the blood of man, produced by food." In terms of the phrase "of God", Lapide says that it refers to the Spirit and grace of God, "by which the mind of man, beforetime carnal, is regenerated and justified, and so a man becomes spiritual, just, and holy, a friend, yea, a son of God."

Craig S. Keener reads the three negations against their first-century background. The phrase "the will of the flesh" reflects the ancient commonplace that children are conceived in parental passion; in the context of the prologue it also contrasts the children "born of God" (1:12) with genetic Israel, whom some early Christians called Israel "according to the flesh" (compare Romans 9:3–8; 1 Corinthians 10:18). Such fleshly birth is neither wrong nor avoidable, Keener notes, but it is inadequate without the Spirit-birth later expounded at John 3:6. On the third phrase, Keener observes that "the will of man" uses the distinctly masculine Greek noun ἀνδρός (andros, "of a man, a husband") rather than a generic word for a human being, and probably refers to the father's authority in deciding to acknowledge and rear a child, an authority that under Roman law extended even to ordering a newborn to be exposed.

Commentators have offered differing explanations of the unusual plural "of bloods" (ἐξ αἱμάτων, ex haimatōn). Where Cornelius à Lapide treats it as a Hebraism for ordinary blood, Keener relates it instead to the common Greek view that the embryo was formed from the father's seed and the mother's blood, or from a mingling of bloods; the Hellenistic Jewish Wisdom of Solomon similarly says that a person becomes flesh "from the seed of a man" and "the blood" (Wisdom 7:1–2). Keener adds that the Hebrew Bible's plural "bloods" for blood shed in murder is a separate idiom and not the sense here; in either case the general meaning is that divine birth does not arise "from human origins".

D. A. Carson observes that the series of negations makes the same point as John 3:6 ("Flesh gives birth to flesh, but the Spirit gives birth to spirit"), so that the verse introduces the "new birth" theme developed in the discourse with Nicodemus in John 3. On this reading, being born into the family of God is wholly unlike being born into a human family: heritage and race, "even the Jewish race", are irrelevant to spiritual birth, a theme the Evangelist enlarges in John 8, where physical descent from Abraham counts for nothing apart from Abraham's faith.

== Commentary from the Church Fathers ==
Thomas Aquinas assembled the following quotations regarding this verse from the early Fathers of the Church:

- Augustine: "To be made then the sons of God, and brothers of Christ, they must of course be born; for if they are not born, how can they be sons? Now the sons of men are born of flesh and blood, and the will of man, and the embrace of wedlock; but how these are born, the next words declare: Not of bloods; that is, the male's and the female's. Bloods is not correct Latin, but as it is plural in the Greek, the translator preferred to put it so, though it be not strictly grammatical, at the same time explaining the word in order not to offend the weakness of one’s hearers."
- Bede: "It should be understood that in holy Scripture, blood in the plural number, has the signification of sin: thus in the Psalms, Deliver me from blood-guiltiness. (Psalm 51:14)."
- Augustine: "In that which follows, Nor of the will of the flesh, nor of the will of man, the flesh is put for the female; because, when she was made out of the rib, Adam said, This is now bone of my bone and flesh of my flesh. (Gen. 2:23) The flesh therefore is put for the wife, as the spirit sometimes is for the husband; because that the one ought to govern, the other to obey. For what is there worse than an house, where the woman hath rule over the man? But these that we speak of are born neither of the will of the flesh, nor the will of man, but of God."
- Bede: "The carnal birth of men derives its origin from the embrace of wedlock, but the spiritual is dispensed by the grace of the Holy Spirit."
- Chrysostom: "The Evangelist makes this declaration, that being taught the vileness and inferiority of our former birth, which is through blood, and the will of the flesh, and understanding the loftiness and nobleness of the second, which is through grace, we might hence receive great knowledge, worthy of being bestowed by him who begat us, and after this show forth much zeal."

Preceded by John 1:12	Gospel of John; Chapter 1	Succeeded by John 1:14
