= John 1:11 =

- ← 1:10 1:12 →
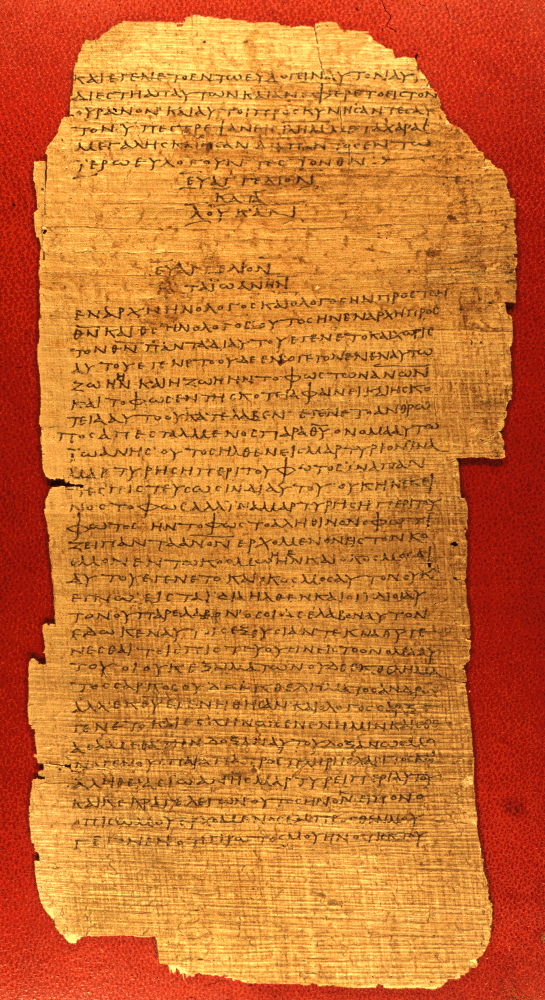
- John 1:1–16 in Papyrus 75 (AD 175–225)
- Book: Gospel of John
- Christian Bible part: New Testament

John 1:11 is the eleventh verse in the first chapter of the Gospel of John in the New Testament of the Christian Bible.

== Content ==
In the original Greek according to Westcott-Hort, this verse is:

Εἰς τὰ ἴδια ἦλθε, καὶ οἱ ἴδιοι αὐτὸν οὐ παρέλαβον.

In the King James Version of the Bible, the text reads:

He came unto his own, and his own received him not.

The New International Version translates the passage as:

He came to that which was his own, but his own did not receive him.

== Analysis ==
Many believe "His own" refers principally to the Jewish people. The English Standard Version notes that the first "his own", τὰ ἴδια (ta idia), refers to "his own things; that is, to his own domain, or to his own people", while the second "his own", οἱ ἴδιοι (oi idioi), should be read as "his own people", the word "people" being implied in the Greek. Jesus came to them as if to his family, but they did not accept him. However it may be extended to the Gentiles, "who for a long time groaned in darkness, and seemed to wait for the light of justice", but who also did not accept him. But the latter part of the verse seems to imply a few, of both Jews and Gentiles, embraced the faith.

D. A. Carson observes that the two occurrences of "his own" differ in form: the Word came to "his own home" (the neuter τὰ ἴδια), but "his own people" (the masculine οἱ ἴδιοι) did not receive him. Although the universality of the Word's creative work means that in one sense all people are "his own", Carson holds that, in the light of the rest of the Gospel, the evangelist is thinking here of the Jewish nation, from whom "salvation is" (John 4:22). For John, he notes, οἱ ἴδιοι is a characteristically relational term (cf. John 10:3–4, John 10:12), so that the emphasis falls not on the mere status of the covenant community but on its proper relationship to the Word.

Carson sets the rejection against the Old Testament portrayal of the recalcitrance of the people of God, citing the divine complaint of Isaiah 65:2–3 and Jeremiah 7:25–26. He argues that this is the theme John takes up and develops: a dominant point in early Christian preaching to Jews was that the Scriptures themselves require that the one proclaimed as Saviour be rejected by his own people, a theme that reaches its climax at John 12:37–41.

Craig S. Keener notes that "his own" here refers to Jesus' own people rather than to his possessions (as the same expression can denote elsewhere, e.g. John 19:27). The verse introduces the inadequate response of most of ethnic Israel to Jesus, hostile among the leaders and divided among the people, which became a theological problem for parts of early Christianity (Romans 11:1, Romans 11:11). It also provides the transition to the remnant of Israel and the Gentiles who would, in Pauline terms, be grafted in (Romans 11:17).

Keener shows the irony against the background of Jewish tradition. Whereas that tradition emphasised that, after the seventy nations had refused the Torah, Israel alone embraced it at Sinai and alone was fit to receive it, the Fourth Gospel presents God's chosen people, who celebrated the Torah, as rejecting the Word, the Torah made flesh. Citing the literary critic R. Alan Culpepper, Keener observes that John introduces this "foundational irony of the gospel" at the very outset; ultimately, he notes, "his own" would be redefined as those who heed Jesus' message (John 10:3–4), those truly in covenant relationship with him.

Carson adds that the rejection of John 1:10–11 is not the evangelist's last word: the following verses at once introduce a believing remnant, as in Old Testament times. The words "his own did not receive him", he suggests, could be the heading of the first twelve chapters of the Gospel, while chapters 13 to 21 could have "yet to all who received him".

== Commentary from the Church Fathers ==
Thomas Aquinas assembled the following quotations regarding this verse from the early Fathers of the Church:

- Chrysostom: "When He said that the world knew Him not, he referred to the times of the old dispensation, but what follows has reference to the time of his preaching; He came unto his own."
- Chrysostom: "He came then unto His own, not for His own good, but for the good of others. But whence did He Who fills all things, and is every where present, come? He came out of condescension to us, though in reality He had been in the world all along. But the world not seeing Him, because it knew Him not, He designed to put on flesh. And this manifestation and condescension is called His advent. But the merciful God so contrives His dispensations, that we may shine forth in proportion to our goodness, and therefore He will not compel, but invites men, by persuasion and kindness, to come of their own accord: and so, when He came, some received Him, and others received Him not. He desires not an unwilling and forced service; for no one who comes unwillingly devotes himself wholly to Him. Whence what follows, And his own received him not. He here calls the Jews His own, as being his peculiar people; as indeed are all men in some sense, being made by Him. And as above, to the shame of our common nature, he said, that the world which was made by Him, knew not its Maker: so here again, indignant at the ingratitude of the Jews, he brings a heavier charge, viz. that His own received Him not."
- Augustine: "Because all things were made by Him."
- Theophylact of Ohrid: "By his own, understand either the world, or Judæa, which He had chosen for His inheritance."

| Preceded by John 1:10 | Gospel of John; Chapter 1 | Succeeded by John 1:12 |
