= John 1:23 =

- ← 1:22 1:24 →
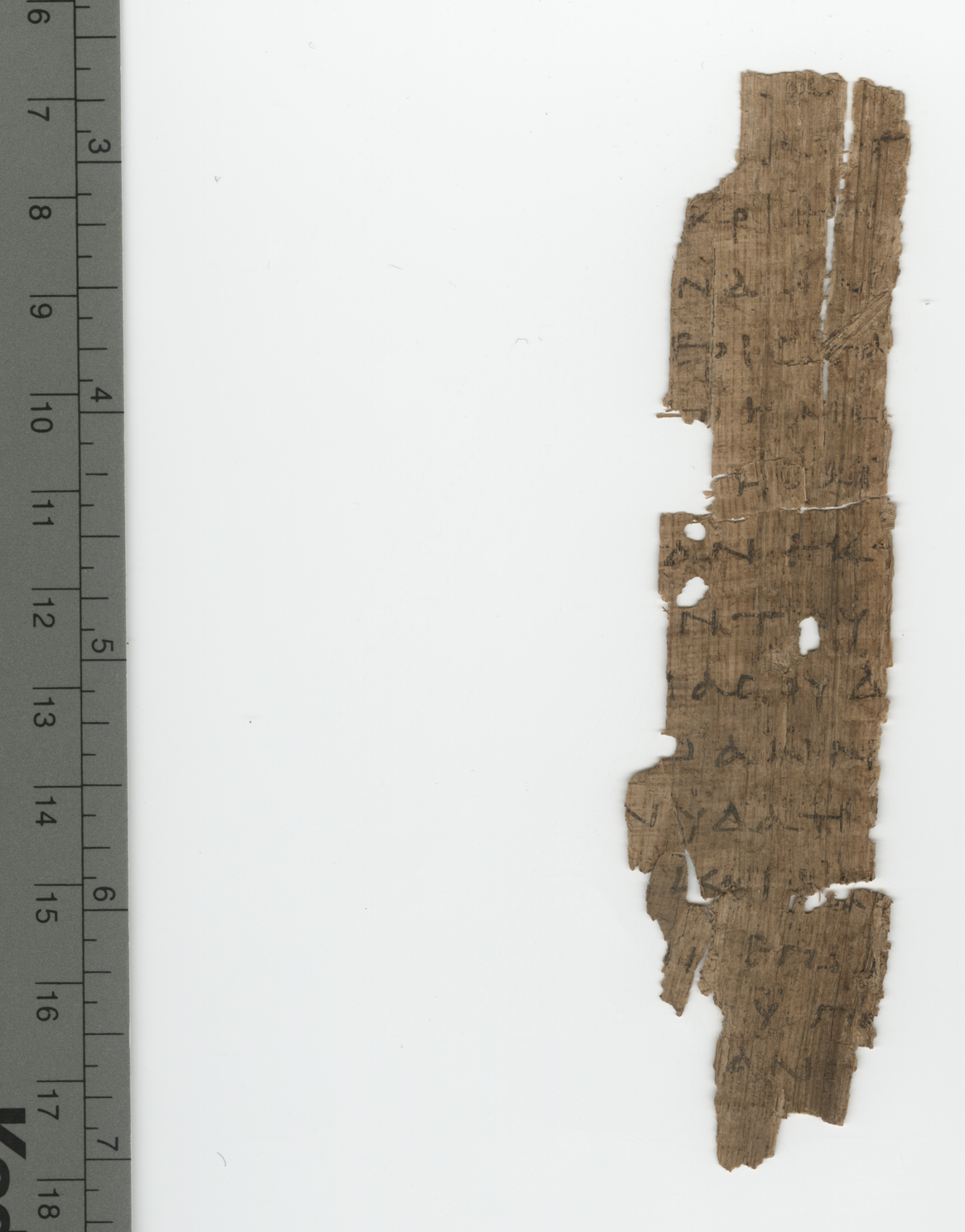
- John 1:21–28 on Papyrus 119, written about AD 250.
- Book: Gospel of John
- Christian Bible part: New Testament

John 1:23 is the twenty-third verse in the first chapter of the Gospel of John in the New Testament of the Christian Bible.

== Content ==
In the original Greek according to Westcott-Hort this verse is:

Ἔφη, Ἐγὼ φωνὴ βοῶντος ἐν τῇ ἐρήμῳ, Εὐθύνατε τὴν ὁδὸν Κυρίου, καθὼς εἶπεν Ἠσαΐας ὁ προφήτης.

In the King James Version of the Bible the text reads:

He said, I am the voice of one crying in the wilderness, Make straight the way of the Lord, as said the prophet Esaias.

The New International Version translates the passage as:

John replied in the words of Isaiah the prophet, "I am the voice of one calling in the desert, 'Make straight the way for the Lord.'"

== Analysis ==
=== Use of Isaiah 40:3 ===
"I am the Voice, etc." comes from Isaiah 40:3. Witham expands the meaning as: "I am a servant, and prepare paths, your hearts, for the Lord. I come, he says, to say that He is at the doors who is expected, that you may be prepared to go whithersoever He may bid you.” MacEvilly notes that, "Having already declared what he was not, he now declares in very distinct terms, what he was, thus meaning to show the nothingness of his origin, compared with the Messiah."

D. A. Carson notes that, having refused every expected eschatological title, the Baptist does not thereby present himself as merely another itinerant preacher: he replies in the words of Isaiah 40:3, applying the text to himself just as the Synoptic Gospels apply it to him (Matthew 3:3; Mark 1:3; Luke 3:4). While he is not the Messiah or the Prophet, Carson observes, he is the voice predicted by Isaiah, "the voice of one calling in the desert, 'Make straight the way for the Lord.'"

Carson explains that in its original context Isaiah 40:3 calls for a metaphorical improvement of the desert road to the east, a levelling of hills and valleys and a straightening of the curves, to accommodate the return of the covenant people from exile. Already within Isaiah, he notes, the end of the exile begins to serve as a literary "type" of a final return to the Lord far greater than a return to geographical Jerusalem: chapters 40 to 66 move from good news to Zion through the redemption accomplished by the suffering Servant of the Lord (Isaiah 52:13–53:12) to a new heaven and a new earth (Isaiah 65–66). It is this typological connection, already established within the book of Isaiah, that the New Testament writers take up and understand to be fulfilled in the voice of the Baptist crying in the desert.

Craig S. Keener adds that the same passage was already current in the Baptist's environment: the Qumran community applied Isaiah 40:3 to its own mission, using it to justify a total withdrawal into the wilderness (1QS 8:13–14). If John knew Qumran, Keener suggests, he may have felt the text suited his ministry the better because he was less separatist than the sect. More broadly, the wilderness was central to Israel's memory and to contemporary hopes of a new exodus, so that many Jewish people awaiting redemption were receptive to prophets (Acts 21:38) and would-be messiahs (Matthew 24:26) appearing there; it was fitting for the Baptist to read theological significance into his own exile from the population centres.

=== Use of Malachi 3:1 ===
Keener notes that the Fourth Gospel avoids the additional texts that the Synoptics blend with Isaiah, such as Mark's combination of Malachi 3:1 with Isaiah 40:3 (Mark 1:2–3). Invoking Malachi would too readily raise the question of Malachi 4:5–6 and the sense in which John is or is not an Elijah returned, a role the Gospel has just had him deny (John 1:21). Isaiah's promise of a new exodus and of a messenger preparing the way before the king at the head of the people was, by contrast, fitting.

=== Independence of tradition vs Synoptics ===
Keener says that although all four gospels apply the Isaiah text to John, only the Fourth Gospel places the citation to him. Because the gospel of John does not follow the Septuagint reading (unlike the Synoptics), some scholars take the quotation as reflecting an independent tradition about the Baptist; Keener regards it as reasonable that the historical John applied the text to himself, given his Synoptic pronouncements about the one whose way he prepared. Carson also notes this divergence: where the Septuagint of Isaiah 40:3 reads "prepare" (ἑτοιμάσατε), the John's Gospel has "make straight" (εὐθύνατε).

== Commentary from the Church Fathers ==
Augustine: "So spoke Esaias: the prophecy was fulfilled in John the Baptist."

Gregory the Great: "Ye know that the only-begotten Son is called the Word of the Father. Now we know, in the case of our own utterance, the voice first sounds, and then the word is heard. Thus John declares himself to be the voice, i. e. because he precedes the Word, and, through his ministry, the Word of the Father is heard by man."

Gregory the Great: "John crieth in the wilderness, because it is to forsaken and destitute Judæa that he bears the consolatory tidings of a Redeemer."

Gregory the Great: "The way of the Lord is made straight to the heart, when the word of truth is heard with humility; the way of the Lord is made straight to the heart, when the life is formed upon the precept."

Origen: "Heracleon, in his discussion on John and the Prophets, infers that because the Saviour was the Word, and John the voice, therefore the whole of the prophetic order was only sound. To which we reply, that, if the trumpet gives an uncertain sound, who shall prepare himself for the battle? If the voice of prophecy is nothing but sound, why does the Saviour send us to it, saying, Search the Scriptures? (John 5:39) But John calls himself the voice, not that crieth, but of one that crieth in the wilderness; viz. of Him Who stood and cried, If any man thirst, let him come unto Me and drink. (John 7:37) He cries, in order that those at a distance may hear him, and understand from the loudness of the sound, the vastness of the thing spoken of."

Origen: "There is need of the voice crying in the wilderness, that the soul, forsaken by God, may be recalled to making straight the way of the Lord, following no more the crooked paths of the serpent. This has reference both to the contemplative life, as enlightened by truth, without mixture of falsehood, and to the practical, as following up the correct perception by the suitable action. Wherefore he adds, Make straight the way of the Lord, as saith the prophet, Esaias."

Theophylact of Ohrid: "Or because he declared the truth plainly, while all who were under the law spoke obscurely."

Preceded by John 1:22	Gospel of John; Chapter 1	Succeeded by John 1:24
