= Lectionary 150 =

Lectionary ℓ 150
- New Testament manuscript
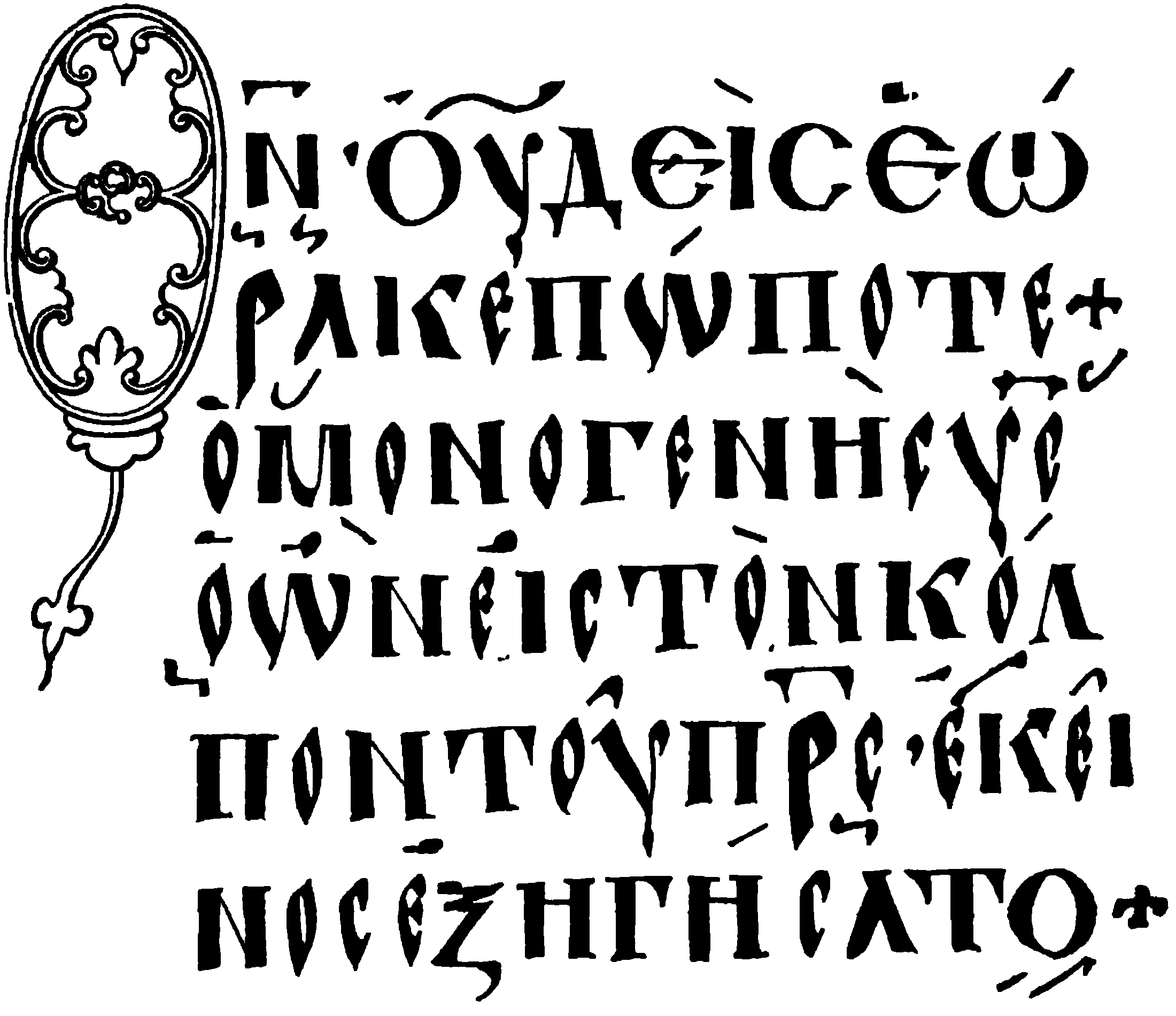
- John 1:18 in Codex Harleianus
- Name: Harley MS 5598
- Text: Gospels
- Date: 995
- Script: Greek
- Found: John Covel in 1677 at Constantinople
- Now at: British Library
- Size: 35.2 by 26.7 cm

Lectionary 150, designated by siglum ℓ 150 (in the Gregory-Aland numbering), is also known as Codex Harleianus. It is a Greek manuscript of the New Testament, on vellum leaves and one of four extant Greek lectionaries with explicit dates from before 1000.

== Description ==
The manuscript is written in compressed Greek Uncial letters, on 374 parchment leaves (35.2 cm by 26.7 cm), in 2 columns per page, 21 lines per page, with ornaments. The capital letters and nomina sacra are in red ink. The codex includes ten leaves of paper containing a series of Lessons from the Gospels, John, Matthew and the Luke lectionary (Evangelistarium). The image shows the text of John 1:18.

It is one of the most beautiful lectionary codices, with a scribal date of 27 May 995 A.D. 'It is a most splendid specimen of the uncial class of Evangelistaria, and its text presents many instructive variations.' It also contains musical notation.

== History ==
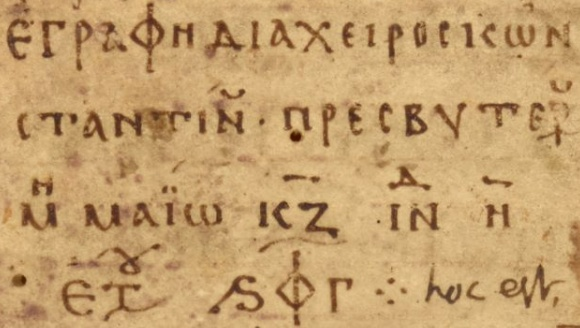
In the colophon (folio 376v), the book is signed by presbyter Constantine and dated 27 May 995

According to the colophon it was written by a presbyter called Constantine. The manuscript came from Constantinople. In 1677 John Covel, chaplain of the English embassy in Constantinople, purchased this manuscript. It was shown by him to John Mill (1645-1707), in London. From Covel it was purchased – together with other manuscripts – by Robert Harley, Earl of Oxford.

It was collated by Bloomfield and examined by Woide.

The manuscript is often cited in the critical editions of the Greek New Testament (UBS3). It is not cited in UBS4.

The codex is now located in the British Library (Harley MS 5598).

== See also ==
- List of New Testament lectionaries
- Biblical manuscript
- Textual criticism

== Bibliography ==
- F. H. A. Scrivener, An Exact Transcript of the Codex Augiensis, to which is added a full Collation of Fifty Manuscripts, London 1859, pp. 47–50.
- Henri Omont, Notes sur les manuscrits grecs du British Museum, Bibliothèque de l’École des Chartes, 45 (1884), p. 337.
- Edward Maunde Thompson, An introduction to Greek and Latin palaeography, Clarendon Press: Oxford 1912, p. 216.
