= Robert Witham =

Roman Catholic biblical scholar

Robert Witham (1667–1738) was an English Roman Catholic college head and biblical scholar.

== Early years ==
Robert Witham as student at Douay

There is scant documentation of Robert Witham’s early life. He was born into a large and committed Catholic family, one of three sons to be ordained as priests. As Catholics were not allowed at the time to study in England for the priesthood, the Witham brothers went to France to attend the English College, Douai (contemporary English spelling, Douay). Sources conflict on Robert’s year of ordination, which was either 1691 or 1694. He remained as a professor at Douay until 1698 or 1699, and then returned to England, where he rose quickly in the Church hierarchy. After serving in his hometown of Cliffe, he was promoted to Vicar General of the Northern District in 1711. In 1714, he was appointed President of his alma mater at Douay and assumed office in 1715.

== Presidency of the English College at Douay ==
The new President would face continuing challenges during his administration. The College was already heavily in debt and would soon face more problems with the failure of the Jacobite Rising of 1715. This resulted in forfeiture of the estates of many of the Catholic families who were benefactors of the College. This was followed in 1719 by devastating losses from the Mississippi Bubble in which an agent of the College had unwisely invested College funds. The College buildings were in a bad state of repair. A smallpox epidemic and accusations of mismanagement by critics were additional problems. From a doctrinal standpoint, Witham sought to guard against the liberalizing influences of Jansenism from surrounding French institutions. His frustration at times showed through. On three occasions, he offered to resign what he called this "troublesome office". However, he would ultimately prevail over all these challenges. By the time of his death in 1738, he had paid off the College debt, increased the student body, staffed the faculty with capable masters, and modernized the campus. His 23-year administration is considered one of the greatest at Douay

== Witham’s New Testament ==
English-speaking Catholics had long relied upon the 1582 Rheims translation of the New Testament. However, changes in the English language since the Elizabethan era caused the need for an updated text. An Irish Catholic priest, Cornelius Nary (1658-1738) had produced a new translation of the New Testament with editions in 1718 and 1719. However, he was suspected of heterodoxy, so his Testament failed to achieve wide acceptance, with Witham one of a number of its critics. In 1727 Witham published a pamphlet that criticized Nary’s work and announced his own forthcoming New Testament. In 1730 his “Annotations on the New Testament of Jesus Christ” appeared with a complete New Testament text plus an extensive body of apologetic annotations. In his To the Reader introduction he praises the accuracy of the existing Rheims translation, but adds that it “perhaps follow’d too scrupulously the Latin” and in the intervening years “many words and Expressions …..[have] become obsolete, and no longer in use.” The wording of the title page of his second edition published later the same year(illustration opposite), makes it clear that Witham intended simply to update the Rheims Version, not produce a new translation. A recent study of sample citations from Matthew shows several unique changes from the Rheims, e. g., Adultery for fornication (5:32), Prodigies for wonders (24:24), and Aspect for countenance (28:03). Despite his earlier criticism of Nary, Witham made many of the same changes from Rheims, e.g., Food for meat (03:04), storm for tempest (16:03), inner Rooms for closets. Somewhat surprisingly he used renderings that had appeared in the Protestant King James Version that he must have known would be controversial, e.g., the Lord for our Lord. (2:19). Although that change was even repeated by Richard Challoner in his 1749 edition and hardly seems controversial today, it caused a continuing debate among Catholics well into the 19th century. Another controversial rendering was cup rather than chalice (26:39). Cup was used by Nary and the King James Version, but Challoner did retain the chalice rendering.

Title pages to the first two editions. The second edition adds a reference to the Rhemes New Testament and a Roman numeral explaining "The obsolete words, and expressions are chang'd."

== Legacy ==
Witham’s New Testament enjoyed a brief period of success. A new, more elaborate edition with copperplate engravings appeared in 1733, and another, after his death, in 1740. However, a new series of editions by his former subordinate Richard Challoner would eventually surpass it in popularity. It would be Witham’s substantial body of annotations that would provide his most lasting legacy. Several Bibles and Testaments published in the next century would make extensive use of them, including the famous Haydock series beginning in 1811 and continuing to the present day.

== Works ==
Witham was the author of:

- Theologia, Douay, 1692, the theses which he maintained on being created D.D.
- Annotations on the New Testament of Jesus Christ, in which, 1. The literal sense is explained according to the Expositions of the ancient Fathers. 2. The false Interpretations, both of the ancient and modern Writers, which are contrary to the received Doctrine of the Catholic Church, are briefly examined and disproved. 3. With an Account of the chief differences betwixt the Text of the ancient Latin Version and the Greek in the printed Editions and Manuscripts, [Douay], 1730, 2 vols. This work contains a translation of the New Testament. The preface was reprinted in the appendix to Rhemes and Doway (1855) by Henry Cotton, the annotations at Manchester in 1813 in Oswald Syers's Bible. A reply appeared under the title of Popery an Enemy to Scripture (1736), by James Serces, vicar of Appleby, Lincolnshire.
- [Witham, Robert], The translation of the New Testament by C[ornelius] N[ary] C[onsultissimae] F[acultatis] P[arisiensis] D[octor] an. 1719, M.DCC.XXVI, anon. Douai.

== See also ==
- Roman Catholicism in Great Britain (The Eighteenth Century & The Catholic Revival in the Nineteenth Century)

== Attribution ==
This article incorporates text from a publication now in the public domain: Lee, Sidney, ed. (1900). "Witham, Robert". Dictionary of National Biography. Vol. 62. London: Smith, Elder & Co.
