= John 1:28 =

- ← 1:27 1:29 →
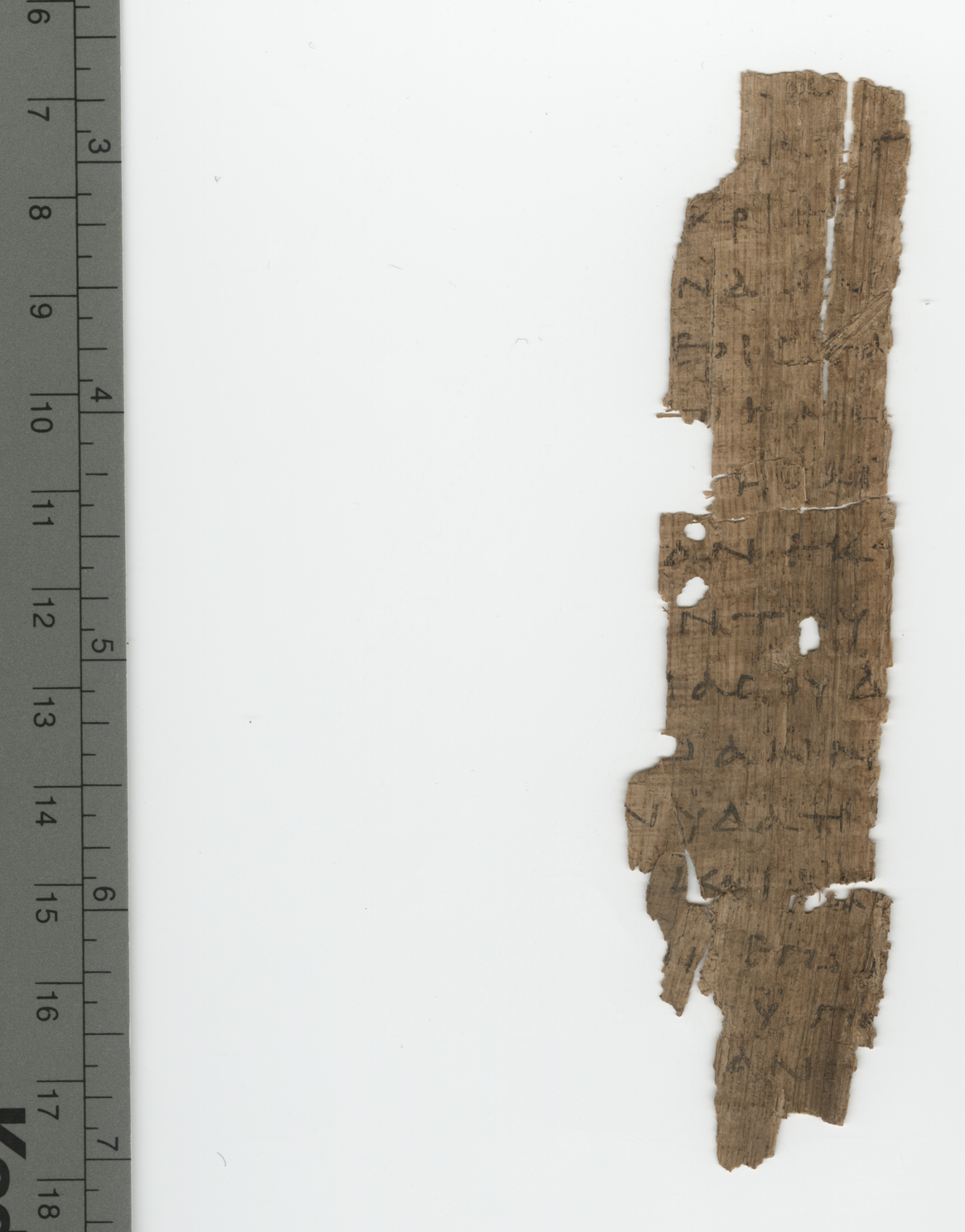
- John 1:21–28 on Papyrus 119, written about AD 250.
- Book: Gospel of John
- Christian Bible part: New Testament

John 1:28 is the twenty-eighth verse in the first chapter of the Gospel of John in the New Testament of the Christian Bible.

== Content ==
In the original Greek according to Westcott-Hort this verse is:

Ταῦτα ἐν βηθανια ἐγένετο πέραν τοῦ Ἰορδάνου, ὅπου ἦν Ἰωάννης βαπτίζων.

In the King James Version of the Bible the text reads:

These things were done in Bethabara beyond Jordan, where John was baptizing.

The New International Version translates the passage as:

This all happened at Bethany on the other side of the Jordan, where John was baptizing.

== Analysis ==
Different manuscript traditions appear to have either Bethany and Bethabara. However, Lapide states that Bethany and Bethabara were one and the same place, or at least very close, on opposite banks of the Jordan. It was here that the Hebrews first crossed the Jordan under the leadership of Joshua when leaving Egypt, to enter the promised land. Bethabara means in Hebrew a house of passage, while Bethany means a house of ships, because ships were waiting to ferry people over the Jordan. The Bethany of Martha and Lazarus was a different place. It would appear that John chose this spot because of the abundance of water and for the memorial it held.

Craig S. Keener observes that the location lies outside Judea, which may carry some theological significance, but that a theological motive cannot fully account for the notice, since a Galilean setting would have served the narrator's symbolic purposes better. The specific place-name, Keener argues, has little function except as a historical observation, one that tells against the assumption of many modern scholars that the Fourth Gospel lacks historical interest.

Keener notes that the Fourth Gospel repeatedly locates much of the Baptist's ministry in Perea, "beyond the Jordan" (John 1:28; John 3:23; John 10:40), a detail that fits the evidence of other sources: Josephus's account implies that Herod Antipas seized John while he was in Perea. Beyond marking a region outside the power centres of Judean Judaism, Keener suggests, the notice reflects the Baptist's actual historical activity there.

=== Bethany vs Bethabara ===
D. A. Carson holds that the manuscript evidence strongly supports "Bethany". "Bethabara", though a known village, is almost certainly not the original reading. Keener likewise notes that the external evidence favours "Bethany", and that "Bethabara" appears to have gained currency late, precisely because the Bethany intended could not be located. Keener says, "Not even Origen could find it." The reading makes no difference to the sense, since a place "beyond the Jordan" cannot be the Bethany near Jerusalem of John 11:1.

=== Location and significance of Bethany ===
Carson says that of the many suggestions advanced, recent research favours identifying it with Batanea (the Bashan of the Old Testament), not a town but a region in the north-east ruled by Philip the Tetrarch, to which Jesus later withdrew when opponents in Judea sought to kill him (John 10:39–40); Carson considers this likelier than a site in the tetrarchy of Herod Antipas. That the evangelist writes "Bethany" rather than "Batanea", Carson notes, is unremarkable given the wide variety in first-century spelling of proper names (Josephus offers three spellings for Batanea, and the Targums preserve forms close to "Bethany"). Keener similarly says that the name "may refer to the area of Batanea in Philip's tetrarchy rather than to a town".

Carson further observes that the place-name may serve a literary purpose: Jesus' public ministry both begins and ends at this "Bethany" beyond the Jordan. Here he is first identified by the Baptist as the Lamb of God (John 1:29); near the end of his ministry he retreats to the same region, where the Baptist's witness is recalled (John 10:40–42); and the following chapter brings his greatest sign, the raising of Lazarus at the other Bethany near Jerusalem (John 11:1), which precipitates the decision that he must die for the people (John 11:45–53).

== Commentary from the Church Fathers ==
Chrysostom: "John having preached the thing concerning Christ publicly and with becoming liberty, the Evangelist mentions the place of His preaching: These things were done in Bethany beyond Jordan, where John was baptizing. For it was in no house or corner that John preached Christ, but beyond Jordan, in the midst of a multitude, and in the presence of all whom He had baptized. Some copies read more correctly Bethabara: for Bethany was not beyond Jordan, or in the desert, but near Jerusalem."

Chrysostom: "He mentions this too for another reason, viz. that as He was relating events which had only recently happened, He might, by a reference to the place, appeal to the testimony of those who were present and saw them."

Glossa Ordinaria: "Or we must suppose two Bethanies; one over Jordan, the other on this side, not far from Jerusalem, the Bethany where Lazarus was raised from the dead."

Alcuin: "The meaning of Bethany is, house of obedience; by which it is intimated to us, that all must approach to baptism, through the obedience of faith."

Origen: "Bethabara means house of preparation; which agreeth with the baptism of Him, who was making ready a people prepared for the Lord. . Jordan, again, means, “their descent.” Now what is this river but our Saviour, through Whom coming into this earth all must be cleansed, in that He came down not for His own sake, but for theirs. This river it is which separateth the lots given by Moses, from those given by Jesus; its streams make glad the city of God. . As the serpent lies hid in the Egyptian river, so doth God in this; for the Father is in the Son. Wherefore whosoever go thither to wash themselves, lay aside the reproach of Egypt, (Joshua 5:9.) are made meet to receive the inheritance, are cleansed from leprosy, (2 Kings 5:14.) are made capable of a double portion of grace, and ready to receive the Holy Spirit; (2 Kings 2:9.) nor doth the spiritual dove light upon any other river. John again baptizes beyond Jordan, as the precursor of Him Who came not to call the righteous, but sinners to repentance."

Preceded by John 1:27	Gospel of John; Chapter 1	Succeeded by John 1:29
