= John 1:30 =

- ← 1:29 1:31 →
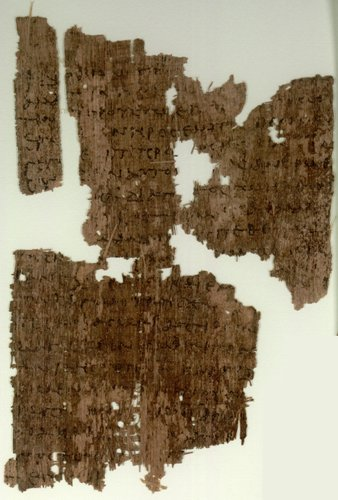
- John 1:29–35 on Papyrus 106, written in the 3rd century.
- Book: Gospel of John
- Christian Bible part: New Testament

John 1:30 is the 30th verse in the first chapter of the Gospel of John in the New Testament of the Christian Bible.

== Content ==
In the original Greek according to Westcott-Hort this verse is:

Οὗτός ἐστι περὶ οὗ ἐγὼ εἶπον, Ὀπίσω μου ἔρχεται ἀνὴρ ὃς ἔμπροσθέν μου γέγονεν, ὅτι πρῶτός μου ἦν.

In the King James Version of the Bible the text reads:

This is he of whom I said, After me cometh a man which is preferred before me: for he was before me.

The New International Version translates the passage as:

This is the one I meant when I said, 'A man who comes after me has surpassed me because he was before me.'

== Analysis ==
This verse appears to hold a similar meaning as verse 27, where John seems to be saying that, "I, who you hold in such esteem, am not worthy of Him, for the distance between us is infinite. Christ is God, and I, a mere man. For even though I was born before him and preached before him (i.e. 'comes after me') he surpasses me".

Keener notes that "one who comes after me" can denote a temporal succession of prophets, and that many scholars read it as early Christian language for "following after" in discipleship, which on their view hints that Jesus had been among the Baptist's followers; the Fourth Gospel alone records that the two ministries briefly overlapped (John 3:22–24). He observes that the phrase may also carry the eschatological sense of the expected "coming one".

The clause rendered "is preferred before me" (or "ranks before me") uses the language of rank. Keener observes that in status-conscious ancient society those of higher rank were allowed to enter or be seated first as a mark of respect, an honour usually accorded to the aged, but that the "antiquity" the Baptist ascribes to Jesus is more than a matter of age or birth order: it is pre-existence itself (John 1:1–3).

== Commentary from the Church Fathers ==
Theophylact of Ohrid: "John having said above to those who came from the Pharisees, that there stood one among them whom they knew not, he here points Him out to the persons thus ignorant: This is He of whom I said, After me cometh a man which is preferred before me. Our Lord is called a man, in reference to His mature age, being thirty years old when He was baptized: or in a spiritual sense, as the Spouse of the Church; in which sense St. Paul speaks, I have espoused you to one husband, that I may present you as a chaste virgin to Christ. (2 Cor. 11:2)"

Augustine: "He cometh after me, because he was born after me: He is made before me, because He is preferred to me."

Gregory the Great: "He explains the reason of this superiority, in what follows: For He was before me; as if his meaning was; And this is the reason of His being superior to me, though born after me, viz. that He is not circumscribed by the time of His nativity. He Who was born of His mother in time, was begotten of His Father out of time."

Theophylact of Ohrid: "Attend, O Arius. He saith not, He was created before me, but He was before me. Let the false sect of Paul of Samosata attend. They will see that He did not derive His original existence from Mary; for if He derived the beginning of His being from the Virgin, how could He have been before His precursor? it being evident that the precursor preceded Christ by six months, according to the human birth."

Preceded by John 1:29	Gospel of John; Chapter 1	Succeeded by John 1:31
