= Baptism with the Holy Spirit =

Term found in the New Testament

In Christian theology, baptism with the Holy Spirit, also called baptism in the Holy Spirit or baptism in the Holy Ghost, has been interpreted by different Christian denominations and traditions in a variety of ways due to differences in the doctrines of salvation and ecclesiology. It is frequently associated with incorporation into the Christian Church, the bestowal of spiritual gifts, and empowerment for Christian ministry. Spirit baptism has been variously defined as part of the sacraments of initiation into the church, as being synonymous with regeneration, or as being synonymous with Christian perfection. The term baptism with the Holy Spirit originates in the New Testament, and all Christian traditions accept it as a theological concept.

Prior to the 18th century, most denominations believed that Christians received the baptism with the Holy Spirit either upon conversion and regeneration or through rites of Christian initiation, such as water baptism and confirmation.

Methodism and the holiness movement, which began in the mid-18th century, teach that the baptism with the Holy Spirit is the same as entire sanctification, which is believed to be a second work of grace.

In the 20th century, Pentecostalism associated Spirit baptism with the gift of speaking in tongues (glossolalia) and spiritual empowerment, with Holiness Pentecostal fathers declaring it to be the third work of grace. As Pentecostalism continued to grow, the belief that Spirit baptism is distinct from entire sanctification became prevalent.

== Biblical description ==
=== Old Covenant background ===
In Christian theology, the work of the Holy Spirit under the Old Covenant is viewed as less extensive than that under the New Covenant inaugurated on the day of Pentecost. The Spirit was restricted to certain chosen individuals, such as high priests and prophets. Often termed the "spirit of prophecy" in rabbinic writings, the Holy Spirit was closely associated with prophecy and divine inspiration. It was anticipated that in the future messianic age God would pour out his spirit upon all of Israel, which would become a nation of prophets.

=== Canonical gospels ===
While the exact phrase "baptism with the Holy Spirit" is not found in the New Testament, two forms of the phrase are found in the canonical gospels using the verb "baptize", from the Greek word baptizein meaning to "immerse" or "plunge". The baptism was spoken about by John the Baptist, who contrasted his water baptism for the forgiveness of sins with the baptism of Jesus. In Mark 1:8 and John 1:33, the Baptist proclaimed that Jesus "will baptize in (the) Holy Spirit"; while in Matthew 3:11 and Luke 3:16, he "will baptize with Holy Spirit and fire".

Jesus is considered the first person to receive the baptism with the Holy Spirit. The Holy Spirit descended on Jesus during his baptism (Luke 3:21–22). After his baptism, Jesus goes into the wilderness and is tempted; however, he "returned in the power of the Spirit" (Luke 4:14). Afterward, Jesus began his ministry and displayed his power by casting out demons, healing the sick, and teaching with authority (Luke 4:16–44).

=== Acts of the Apostles ===
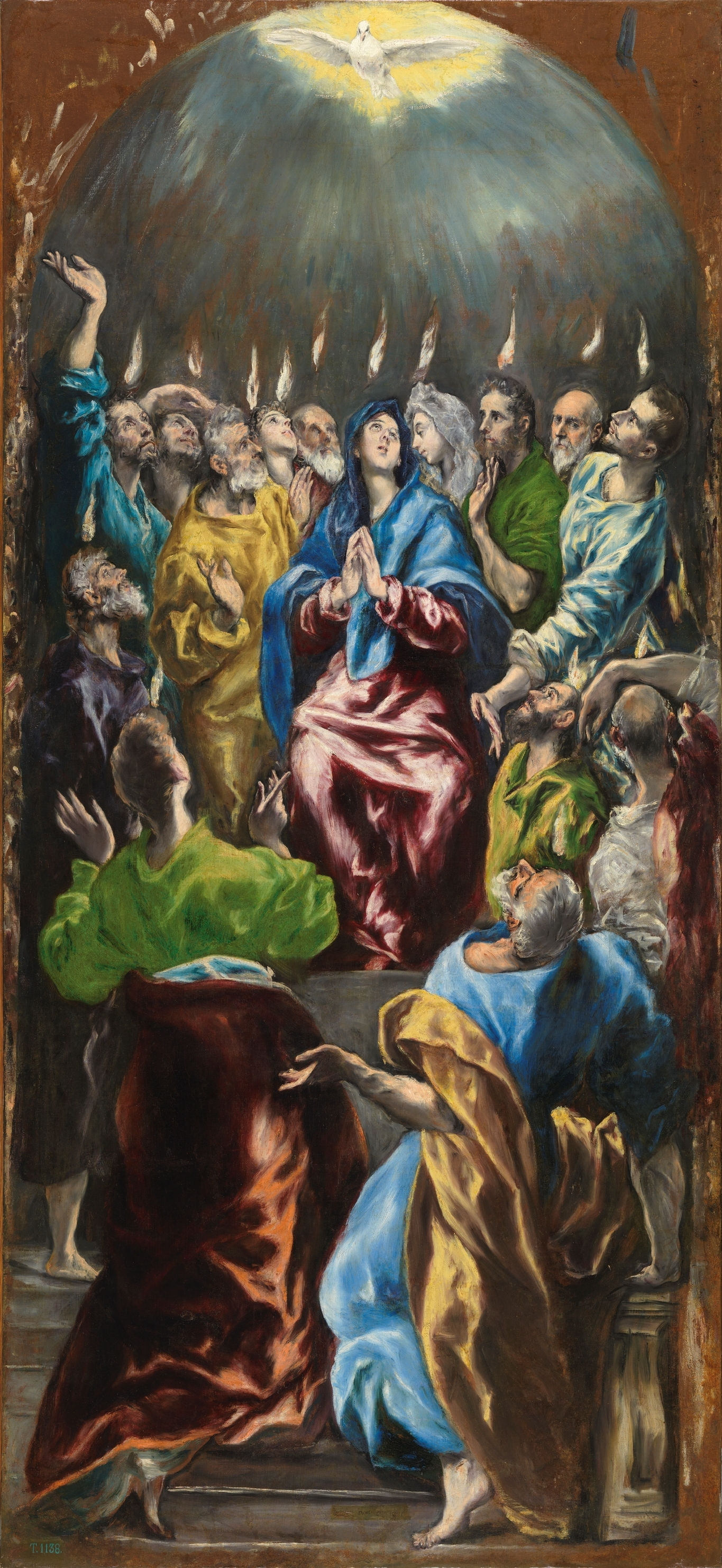
El Greco's depiction of Pentecost, with tongues of fire and a dove representing the Holy Spirit's descent (c. 1600)

The phrase "baptized in the Holy Spirit" occurs two times in Acts of the Apostles, first in Acts 1:5 and second in Acts 11:16. Other terminology is used in Acts to indicate Spirit baptism, such as "filled" (Acts 2:4). "Baptized in the Spirit" indicates an outward immersion into the reality of the Holy Spirit, while "filled with the Spirit" suggests an internal diffusion. Both terms speak to the totality of receiving the Spirit.

The baptism with the Holy Spirit is described in various places as the Spirit "poured out upon" (Acts 2:17–18, 33), "falling upon" (Acts 10:44), "coming upon" (Acts 1:8; 8:16; 19:6) people. To "pour out" suggests abundance and reflects John 3:34, "God gives the Spirit without limit". Another expression, "come upon" is related to a statement by Jesus in Luke 24:49, "I am sending the promise of my Father upon you. But stay in the city until you are clothed with power from on high". The language of "come on" and "clothed with" suggest possession by and endowment with the Holy Spirit.

The narrative of Acts begins after Jesus' crucifixion and resurrection. The resurrected Jesus directed his disciples to wait in Jerusalem for the baptism in the Holy Spirit and promised, "you will receive power when the Holy Spirit has come upon you, and you will be my witnesses in Jerusalem and in all Judea and Samaria, and to the end of the earth" (Acts 1:8). After his ascension, Jesus was given authority from the Father to pour out the Holy Spirit (Acts 2:33).

In the New Testament, the messianic expectations found in early Judaism were fulfilled on the day of Pentecost as recorded in Acts 2:1–41. The Christian community was gathered together in Jerusalem when a sound from heaven like rushing wind was heard and tongues like tongues of flame rested on everyone. They were filled with the Holy Spirit and began to speak in tongues, miraculously praising God in foreign languages. A crowd gathered and was addressed by the Apostle Peter who stated that the occurrence was the fulfillment of the prophecy of Joel 2, "And in the last days it shall be, God declares, that I will pour out my Spirit on all flesh, and your sons and your daughters shall prophesy". Peter then explained how the Spirit came to be poured out, recounting Jesus' ministry and passion and then proclaiming his resurrection and enthronement at the right hand of God. In response, the crowd asked Peter what they should do. He responded, "Repent, and be baptized every one of you in the name of Jesus Christ for the remission of sins, and ye shall receive the gift of the Holy Ghost. For the promise is unto you, and to your children, and to all that are afar off, even as many as the Lord our God shall call (Acts 2:38-39)."

Baptism in the Holy Spirit occurs elsewhere in Acts. The gospel had been proclaimed in Samaria and the apostles Peter and John were sent from Jerusalem. The new believers had been baptized in water, but the Holy Spirit had not yet fallen on them. The Samaritans received the Holy Spirit when Peter and John laid their hands on them (Acts 8:14–18). The Apostle Paul was also filled with the Holy Spirit when Ananias of Damascus laid hands on him, and afterwards Paul was baptized with water (Acts 9:17–19).

Later in Acts, Peter preached the gospel to the household of Cornelius the Centurion, a gentile. While he preached, the Holy Spirit fell on the gentiles, and they began to speak in tongues. The Jewish believers with Peter were amazed, and the household was water baptized (Acts 10:44–48). While the apostle Paul was in Ephesus, he found disciples there and discovered that they did not know of the existence of the Holy Spirit and had only received John the Baptist's baptism. After baptizing them in Jesus' name, Paul laid his hands on them, and they began to speak in tongues and prophesy (Acts 19:1–7).

== History ==
=== Early Christianity ===
In the early Church, the laying on of hands on the newly baptized to impart the gift of the Holy Spirit was the origin of the sacrament of confirmation. In the Eastern church, confirmation continued to be celebrated immediately after water baptism. The two rites were separated in the Western church. According to Pentecostal historian H. Vinson Synan, "the basic premise of Pentecostalism, that one may receive later effusions of the Spirit after initiation/conversion, can be clearly traced in Christian history to the beginnings of the rite of confirmation in the Western churches".

=== Reformation era and Puritanism (16th and 17th centuries) ===
Huldrych Zwingli, a leading Protestant Reformer in Switzerland, taught three distinct baptisms: water baptism, teaching baptism (having been educated about the Christian religion) and Spirit baptism. While full baptism included all three, Zwingli emphasized that the external baptisms of water and teaching could not provide salvation. The inner baptism of the Spirit alone could save because it conferred faith. According to Zwingli, the three baptisms could be given separately; Spirit baptism could occur first or last in the sequence.

Many Puritans believed that the conversion experience was followed by a later and distinct experience of the Holy Spirit. This experience was characterized by receiving assurance of one's salvation. English Puritan Thomas Goodwin equated this experience with the baptism in the Holy Spirit and the "seal of the Spirit" referenced in Ephesians 1.

=== Methodism and the Holiness Movement (18th and 19th centuries) ===
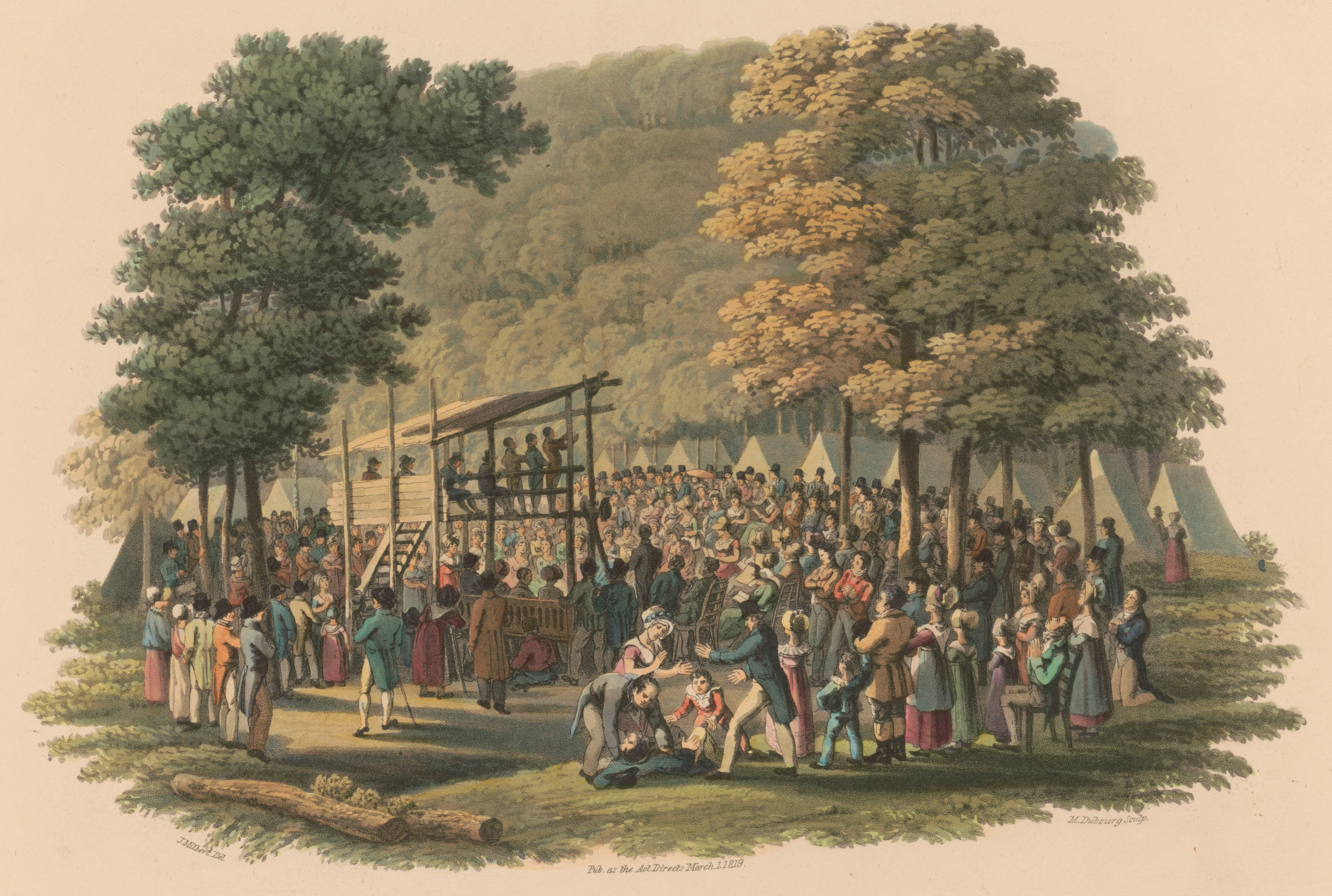
Methodist preachers are known for promulgating the doctrines of the new birth and entire sanctification to the public at events such as tent revivals and camp meetings, which they believe is the reason that God raised them up into existence.

Wesley taught that while the new birth (first work of grace) was the start of the Christian life, but "inbred sin" remained and must be removed through Christian perfection, which he stated had instantaneous and gradual aspects. John Fletcher, Wesley's designated successor and Methodism's systematic theologian, called Christian perfection (entire sanctification) "baptism in the Holy Spirit". On the subject, Fletcher wrote:

Lastly: if we will attain the full power of godliness, and be peaceable as the Prince of Peace, and merciful as our heavenly Father, let us go on to the perfection and glory of Christianity; let us enter the full dispensation of the Spirit. Till we live in the pentecostal glory of the Church: till we are baptized with the Holy Ghost: till the Spirit of burning and the fire of Divine love have melted us down, and we have been truly cast into the softest mould of the Gospel: till we can say with St. Paul, "We have received the Spirit of love, of power, and of a sound mind;" till then we shall be carnal rather than spiritual believers.

In mid-19th century America, the Wesleyan holiness movement that had adherents both within and outside mainline Methodism began to emphasize the instantaneous aspect of Wesley's doctrine of entire sanctification (second work of grace), which one received by faith at a definite moment in time. This second blessing (or second work of grace), as it was commonly called, allowed Christians to be freed from the power of sin. Following the Methodist theologian John Fletcher, adherents of the holiness movement use the term baptism in the Holy Spirit synonymously with entire sanctification. This is reflected in the doctrinal statements of various Wesleyan denominations, such as the Missionary Methodist Church, which teaches: "We believe that a believer can be sanctified or filled with the Holy Ghost subsequent to Salvation and will receive Power to live a Holy Life and Witness to a lost and dying World."

Synan traces the influence of Catholic and Anglican mystical traditions on John Wesley's doctrine of Christian perfection or entire sanctification. Furthermore, theologian James Dunn notes early Methodist beliefs can be directly linked to Puritan teaching on the Holy Spirit.

=== Keswick higher life movement (19th century) ===
After his conversion in 1821, Presbyterian minister and revivalist Charles Grandison Finney experienced what he called "baptism in the Holy Spirit" accompanied by "unutterable gushings" of praise. Finney and other Reformed writers, known as Oberlin perfectionists, agreed that there was a life altering experience after conversion, but unlike their Wesleyan holiness counterparts, they conceived of it as an ongoing process enabling believers to devote themselves wholly to Christ's service. Similarly, the English Higher Life movement taught that the second blessing was an "enduement of power". According to this view, Spirit baptism gave Christians the ability to be witnesses for the gospel and to perform Christian service. Wesleyan teachers emphasized purity while Oberlin and higher life advocates stressed power as the defining outcome of Spirit baptism.

=== 20th century ===
In the early 1890s, R.C. Horner, a Canadian holiness evangelist, introduced a theological distinction that would be important for the development of Pentecostalism. He argued in his books Pentecost (1891) and Bible Doctrines (1909) that the baptism in the Holy Spirit was not synonymous with the second blessing but was actually a third work of grace subsequent to salvation and sanctification that empowered the believer for service. Charles Fox Parham would build on this doctrinal foundation when he identified speaking in tongues as the Bible evidence of Spirit baptism. John Wesley's Checks to Antinomianism became a standard for Holiness Pentecostal teachers.

== Views ==
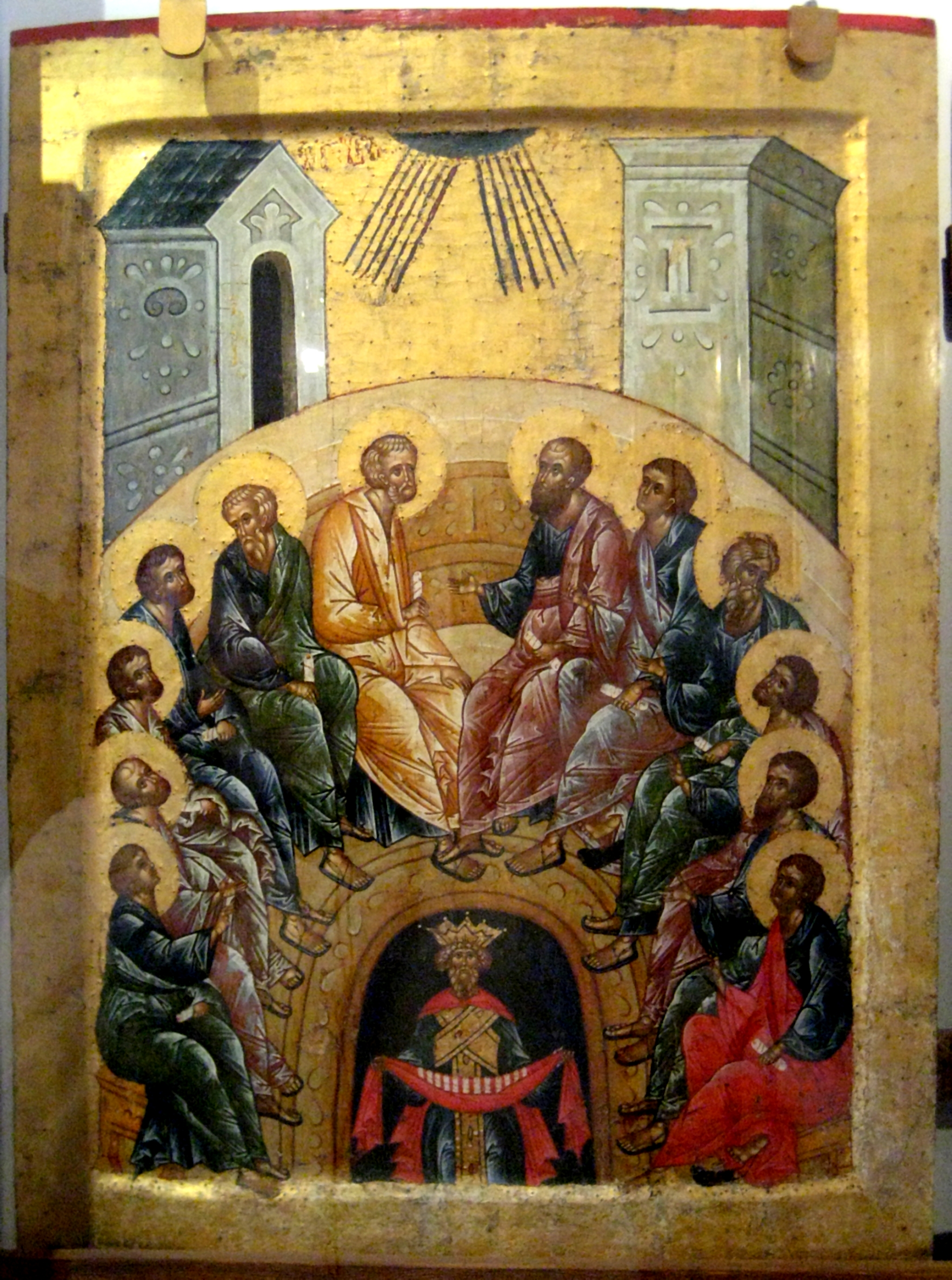
Russian Orthodox depiction of Pentecost, c. 1497

The diverse views on Spirit-baptism held among Christian traditions can be categorized into four main groups. These are baptism with the Spirit as sacramental initiation (Orthodox and Catholic churches), regeneration (Reformed tradition), entire sanctification (Methodist tradition, along with others in the holiness movement) and empowerment for witness and vocation (Pentecostals and charismatics).

=== Sacramental initiation ===
==== Eastern Orthodoxy ====
Eastern Orthodox Churches believe that baptism in the Holy Spirit is conferred with water baptism. The individual is anointed with oil (chrism) immediately after baptism. According to Cyril of Jerusalem:

This holy ointment is no more simple ointment, nor (so to say) common, after the invocation, but the gift of Christ; and by the presence of His Godhead, it causes in us the Holy Ghost. It is symbolically applied to thy forehead and thy other senses and while thy body is anointed with visible ointment, thy soul is sanctified by the Holy and life-giving Spirit.

==== Catholicism ====
The Catholic Church teaches that baptism, confirmation, and the Eucharist—the sacraments of Christian initiation—lay the foundations of the Christian life. The Christian life is based on baptism. It is "the gateway to life in the Spirit" and "signifies and actually brings about the birth of water and the Spirit". The post-baptismal anointing (Chrismation in the Eastern churches) signifies the gift of the Holy Spirit and announces a second anointing to be conferred later in confirmation that completes the baptismal anointing.

Confirmation, then, is necessary for the completion of baptismal grace. When confirmed, Catholics receive the "special outpouring of the Holy Spirit as once granted to the apostles on the day of Pentecost". For the confirmand it increases the seven gifts of the Holy Spirit (wisdom, understanding, counsel, fortitude, knowledge, piety, and fear of the Lord), unites more fully to Christ and the Church, and gives strength to confess Christ and defend the faith. The rite of confirmation orients toward mission, and many liturgical texts remind the initiate that the gift of the Holy Spirit should be used for service to the church and the world.

Those in the charismatic movement, including the Catholic Charismatic Renewal, teach an experiential baptism of the Holy Spirit similar to Pentecostals, defining it as the "sovereign action of God, which usually occurs when someone with a disposition of surrender and docility, prays for a fresh outpouring of the Holy Spirit in his or her life." The consensus of Catholic theologians teach that this "baptism in the Holy Spirit unleashes the Holy Spirit that is already present within us, by revitalizing the graces we received in the sacrament of Baptism." At the same time, "Baptism in the Spirit doesn't only re-ignite the graces already given to Christians through the Sacraments – it's also a new, fresh experience of the Holy Spirit which equips and inspires the individual for service, for mission, for discipleship and for life." Rev. Brenton Cordeiro teaches that those who have received Baptism with the Holy Spirit "testify that the experience brought them to a new awareness of the reality and presence of Jesus Christ in their lives [as well as] a new hunger for the Word of God, the Sacraments and were filled with a renewed desire for holiness."

==== Irvingism ====
The New Apostolic Church, an Irvingian Church, believes that baptism in the Holy Spirit is a second step after the Holy Baptism with water. It also referred to as the Holy Sealing. It is a sacrament through which the believer, through the laying on of hands and the prayer of an apostle, receives the gift of the Holy Spirit. The death out of water and spirit, which was begun in the Holy Baptism with water, is completed through the Holy Sealing.

=== Regeneration ===
The main position on Spirit baptism among the Reformed churches, dispensationalists, and many Baptists is that the baptism with the Holy Spirit occurs simultaneously with regeneration, when those who have faith in Jesus Christ receive the Holy Spirit and are incorporated into the body of Christ.

=== Entire sanctification ===
==== Methodism (inclusive of the holiness movement) ====
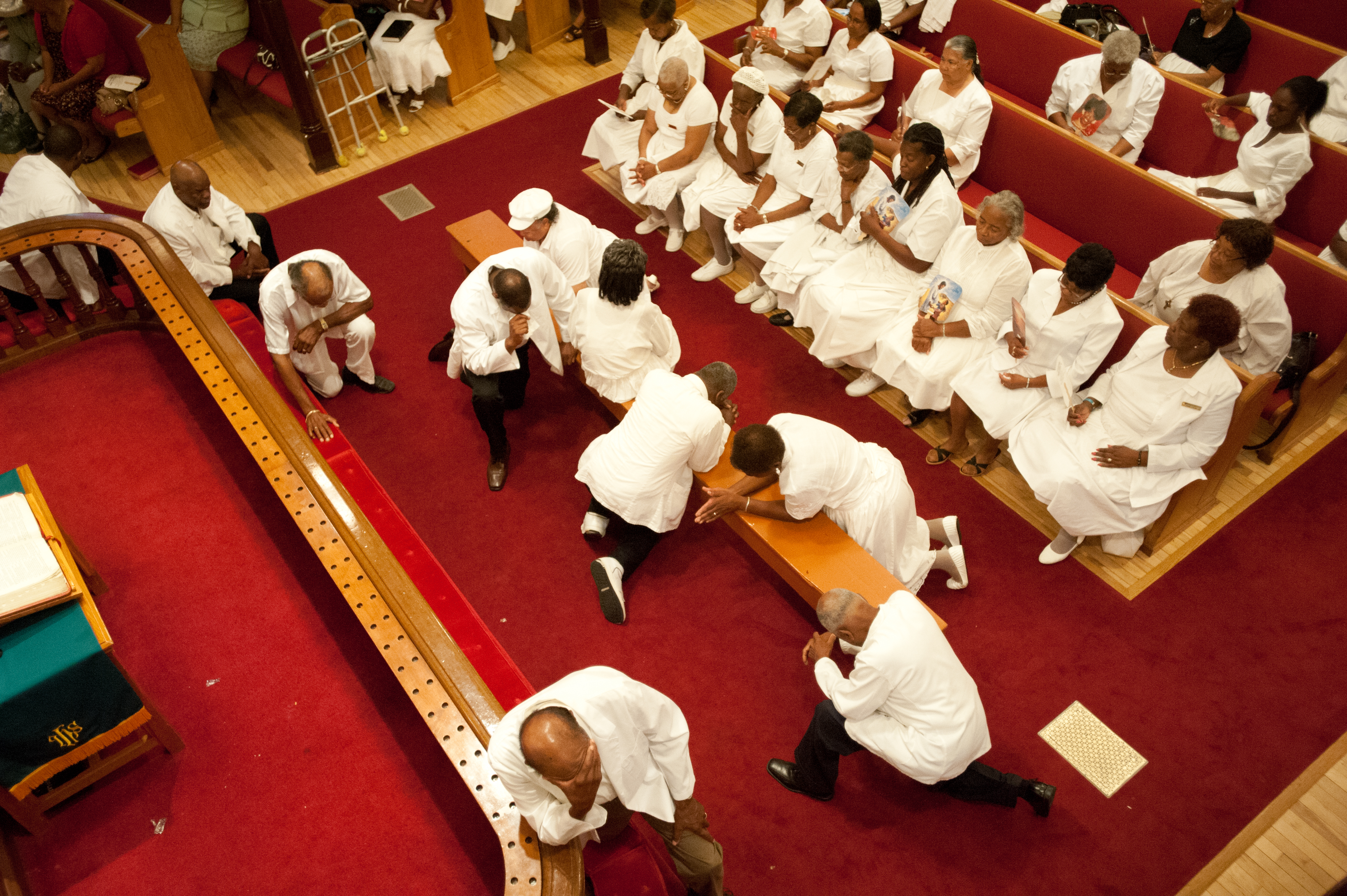
Methodists often seek the new birth and entire sanctification at the mourners' bench or chancel rails during services held in local churches, tent revivals and camp meetings (pictured are people praying at Mount Zion United Methodist Church in Pasadena).

Within Methodism (inclusive of the holiness movement), baptism with the Holy Spirit occurs through entire sanctifiation. John Fletcher, the systematic theologian of Methodism, articulated this Wesleyan doctrine, and held that this second work of grace was the "full measure of the spirit, which perfects Christian believers." The United Methodist Confession of Faith affirms Wesley's doctrine of entire sanctifiation (also known as Christian perfection):

Entire sanctification is a state of perfect love, righteousness and true holiness which every regenerate believer may obtain by being delivered from the power of sin, by loving God with all the heart, soul, mind and strength, and by loving one's neighbor as one's self. Through faith in Jesus Christ this gracious gift may be received in this life both gradually and instantaneously, and should be sought earnestly by every child of God.

In the holiness movement within mainline Methodism and outside of it, entire sanctification is emphasized as a definite experience linked to baptism with the Holy Spirit:

2.9 ENTIRE SANCTIFICATION As all justified believers are sanctified in Christ (I Cor. 1:2; 1:30), so all may be sanctified by Christ (Eph 5:25, 26; Heb. 13:12). Entire sanctification follows regeneration as circumcision follows birth. It is to enable us to "Love the Lord thy God with all thine heart" (Deut. 30:6). By this circumcision "made without hands", the "body of the sins of the flesh" is put off (Col. 2:11). Love is made perfect (I John 4:17); Holiness is perfected (II Cor. 7:1).

2.9.1 Relationship to Regeneration. Entire sanctification is subsequent to regeneration (John 17:9 -17) and is effected by the baptism of the Holy Spirit (Luke 3:16. 17: I Pet. 1:2; Rom 15:16). It is for all believers (John 17:20; I Thess. 4:2, 7; 5:23, 24), and is an instantaneous experience, received by faith (Acts 2:1-4; 15:8, 9). It cleanses the heart of the recipient from all sin (I John 1:7, 9; Acts 15:8, 9), sets him apart and endows him with power for the accomplishment of all to which he is called (Luke 24:49; Acts 1:8).

2.9.2 Evidence of the Experience. Those who teach that some special phenomena such as speaking with unknown tongues constitutes a witness to the Baptism with the Spirit expose themselves and their hearers to peril of dangerous fanaticism. Perhaps no wiser counsel has been given on this matter then that of John Wesley who wrote long before the modern "tongues" movement appeared: "The grounds of a thousand mistakes is the not considering, deeply that love is the highest gift of God – humble, gentle, patient love – that all visions, revelation, manifestations whatsoever are little things compared to love. It were well you should be thoroughly sensible of this. The heaven of heavens is love. There is nothing higher in religion; there is in effect, nothing else. If you look for anything but more love you are looking wide of the mark, you are getting out of the royal way. And when you are asking others, "Have you received this or that blessing," if you mean anything but more love you, you mean wrong; you are leading them out of the way, and putting them upon a false scent. Settle it then in your heart, that from the moment God has saved you from all sin, you are to aim at nothing but more of that love described in the thirteenth chapter of First Corinthians. You can go no higher than this till you are carried into Abraham's bosom."

— Doctrine, Pilgrim Holiness Church

According to the Articles of Faith of the Church of the Nazarene, sanctification is a work of God after regeneration "which transforms believers into the likeness of Christ" and is made possible by "initial sanctification" (which occurs simultaneously with regeneration and justification), entire sanctification, and "the continued perfecting work of the Holy Spirit culminating in glorification". Entire sanctification (as opposed to growth in grace) is an act of God in which a believer is made free from original sin and able to devote themselves entirely to God:

It is wrought by the baptism with or infilling of the Holy Spirit, and comprehends in one experience the cleansing of the heart from sin and the abiding, indwelling presence of the Holy Spirit, empowering the believer for life and service.

As baptism with the Holy Spirit is synonymous with Entire Sanctification in Methodism, some Methodist connexions who have not allowed for the charismatic movement, such as the Immanuel Missionary Church, condemn Pentecostal theology:

The modern so-called gift of tongues, is unscriptural and cannot be taken as a sign of the Baptism of the Holy Ghost. Jesus said, "An evil and adulterous generation seeketh after a sign." Therefore, to hold or teach that speaking in an unknown tongue is the evidence of a work of grace in the heart, is to Biblical for the following reasons:

1. The word "unknown" is not in the original Greek, and the word "tongue" comes from the Greek word "glossa", meaning language.
2. None of the gifts can be taken as a witness of the Spirit's baptism (I Corinthians 12).
3. Paul exhorted that all speaking in the church should be to edification. Therefore such speaking that does not edify will not be permitted in our places of worship.

— General Standards, Immanuel Missionary Church

In certain Methodist denominations, such as the Global Methodist Church and United Methodist Church, the ordinance of confirmation is observed, in which a believer is strengthened by the Holy Spirit through the laying on of hands; Methodism's systematic theologian John William Fletcher saw being entirely sanctified as the goal of the vows made at confirmation. John Wesley laid emphasis upon the second work of grace—entire sanctification—as "a personal, non-ceremonial experience of sanctifying grace", which distinguishes Methodism.

==== Quakerism (inclusive of the holiness movement) ====
Following the new birth, George Fox taught the possibility of "holiness of heart and life through the instantaneous baptism with the Holy Spirit subsequent to the new birth" (cf. Christian perfection).

The early Quakers, following Fox, taught that as a result of the New Birth through the power of the Holy Spirit, man could be free from actual sinning if he continued to rely on the inward light and "focus on the cross of Christ as the center of faith". George Fox emphasized "personal responsibility for faith and emancipation from sin" in his teaching on perfection. For the Christian, "perfectionism and freedom from sin were possible in this world".

This traditional Quaker teaching continues to be emphasized by Conservative Friends, such as the Ohio Yearly Meeting of the Religious Society of Friends and Holiness Friends, such as the Central Yearly Meeting of Friends.

=== Empowerment ===
==== Classical Pentecostalism ====
In classical Pentecostalism, the baptism with the Holy Spirit is understood to be a separate and distinct experience occurring sometime after regeneration. Influenced by the Holiness movement, baptism with the Holy Spirit was regarded by the first Pentecostals as being the third work of grace, following the new birth (first work of grace) and entire sanctification (second work of grace). Baptism with the Holy Spirit is an empowering experience, equipping Spirit-filled believers for witness and ministry. Extending from this is the belief that all the spiritual gifts mentioned in the New Testament are to be sought and exercised to build up the church. Pentecostals believe that Spirit baptism will be accompanied by the physical evidence of speaking in tongues (glossolalia).

According to Pentecostal biblical interpretation, the Gospel of John 20:22 shows that the disciples of Jesus were already born again before the Holy Spirit fell at Pentecost. They then cite biblical examples in the Book of Acts 2, 8, 10, and 19 to show that it was common in the New Testament for Spirit baptism to occur after conversion. In following the biblical pattern, they argue, Christians today should also pray for this baptism which results in greater power for ministry and witness.

On the subject of Spirit baptism, Donald Gee wrote of the Christians on the Day of Pentecost:

With them it was not mere intellectual assent to some article in a creed defining an orthodox doctrine concerning the Holy Spirit. Neither were they satisfied to acquiescence to a vague idea that in some indefinite manner the Holy Spirit had been imparted to them upon conversion. They gladly and thankfully recognized His gracious operations in their regeneration and sanctification, but their own personal reception of the Holy Spirit was an intensely vivid experience. They knew when He came, where He came, and how he came. Nothing reveals this more than Paul's searching question to certain disciples whom he immediately sensed to be spiritually lacking in a vital part of their Christian inheritance—'Have ye received the Holy Ghost?' (Acts 19:2). The challenge was to experience, not to doctrine. How significant! An Ephesian 'Pentecost' speedily rectified their shortcoming, and it was an experience as vivid as all the rest had received—'They spake with tongues and prophesied.'

In Pentecostal experience, Spirit baptism can be quite dramatic, as shown by William Durham's account of his Spirit baptism:

I was overcome by the mighty fulness of power and went down under it. For three hours He wrought wonderfully in me. My body was worked in sections, a section at a time. And even the skin on my face was jerked and shaken, and finally I felt my lower jaw begin to quiver in a strange way. This continued for some little time, when finally my throat began to enlarge and I felt my vocal organs being, as it were, drawn into a different shape. O how strange and wonderful it was! and how blessed it was to be thus in the hands of God. And last of all I felt my tongue begin to move and my lips to produce strange sounds which did not originate in my mind.

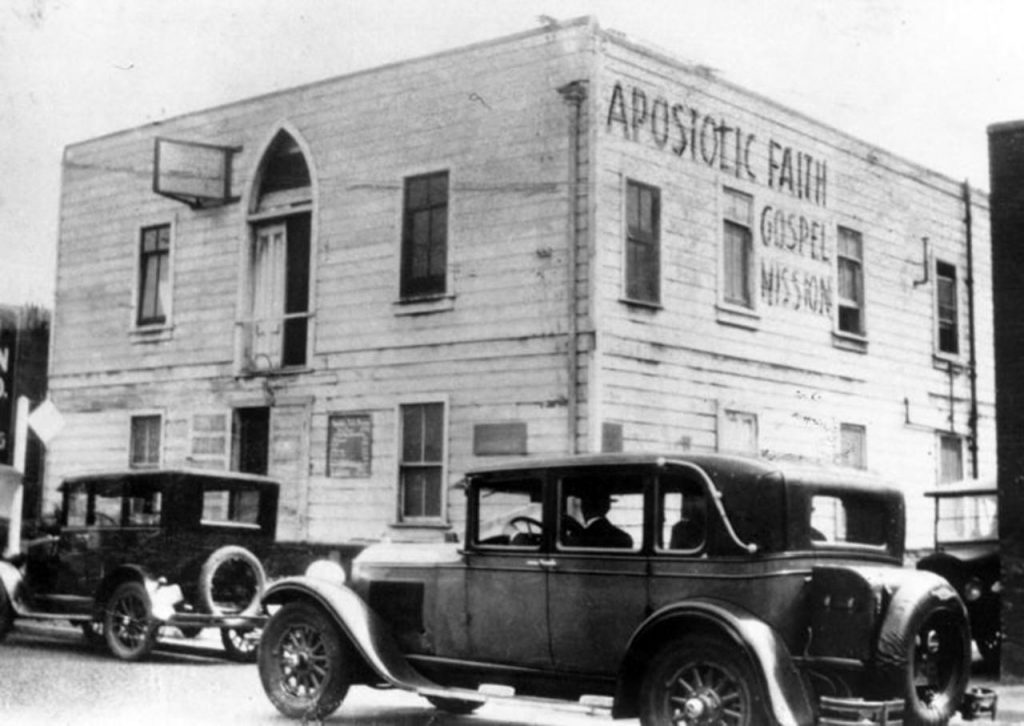
The Apostolic Faith Mission on Azusa Street, now considered to be the birthplace of Pentecostalism

In some accounts of Spirit baptism, Pentecostals report receiving visions, such as the account of Lucy Leatherman, an Azusa Street participant:

While seeking for the Baptism with the Holy Ghost in Los Angeles, after Sister Ferrell [sic] laid hands on me I praised and praised God and saw my Savior in the heavens. And as I praised, I came closer and closer and I was so small. By and by I swept into the wound in His side, and He was not only in me but I in Him, and there I found that rest that passeth all understanding, and He said to me, you are in the bosom of the Father. He said I was clothed upon and in the secret place of the Most High. But I said, Father, I want the gift of the Holy Ghost, and the heavens opened and I was overshadowed, and such power came upon me and went through me. He said, Praise Me, and when I did, angels came and ministered unto me. I was passive in His hands working on my vocal cords, and I realized they were loosing me. I began to praise Him in an unknown language.

==== Charismatic movement ====
The charismatic movement is an interdenominational revival that has affected the mainstream denominations of Christianity, including Lutheranism, Catholicism, Moravianism, Anglicanism, Methodism, and Reformed Christianity, among others. They are distinguished from Pentecostals because they tend to allow for differing viewpoints on whether Spirit baptism is subsequent to conversion and whether tongues is always a sign of receiving the baptism.

The Catholic Charismatic Renewal believes that there is a further experience of empowerment with the Holy Spirit. The Rev. Brenton Cordeiro states that Baptism with the Holy Spirit is the "sovereign action of God, which usually occurs when someone with a disposition of surrender and docility, prays for a fresh outpouring of the Holy Spirit in his or her life." As stated by Rev. Fr. Raniero Cantalamessa, "baptism in the Spirit is not a sacrament, but it is related to a sacrament [...] to the sacraments of Christian initiation. The baptism in the Spirit makes real and in a way renews Christian initiation". The consensus of Catholic theologians teach that "baptism in the Holy Spirit unleashes the Holy Spirit that is already present within us, by revitalizing the graces we received in the sacrament of Baptism." At the same time, "Baptism in the Spirit doesn't only re-ignite the graces already given to Christians through the Sacraments – it's also a new, fresh experience of the Holy Spirit which equips and inspires the individual for service, for mission, for discipleship and for life." Rev. Brenton Cordeiro teaches that those who have received Baptism with the Holy Spirit "testify that the experience brought them to a new awareness of the reality and presence of Jesus Christ in their lives [as well as] a new hunger for the Word of God, the Sacraments and were filled with a renewed desire for holiness."

==== Neo-charismatic movement ====
During the 1980s, another renewal movement emerged called the "Third Wave of the Holy Spirit" (the first wave was Pentecostalism and the second wave was the charismatic movement). Third wave charismatics stress that the preaching of the gospel, following the New Testament pattern, should be accompanied by "signs, wonders, and miracles". They believe that all Christians are baptized with the Holy Spirit at conversion, and prefer to call subsequent experiences as "filling" with the Holy Spirit. John Wimber and the Vineyard churches are most prominently associated with this label.

=== Mormonism ===
In the Latter Day Saint movement, the "baptism of fire and of the Holy Ghost" refers to the experience of one who undergoes the ordinance of confirmation with the laying on of hands to receive the gift of the Holy Ghost. It follows baptism in water and is essential to salvation. The gift of the Holy Ghost is the privilege of receiving inspiration, divine manifestations, direction, spiritual gifts, and other blessings from the Holy Spirit (see Gifts of the Spirit in Mormonism). It begins the lifetime process of sanctification.

== See also ==
- Consolamentum
- Protestant theologies
- Spiritual Christians from Russia
- Spirit possession
