= John 1:25 =

- ← 1:24 1:26 →
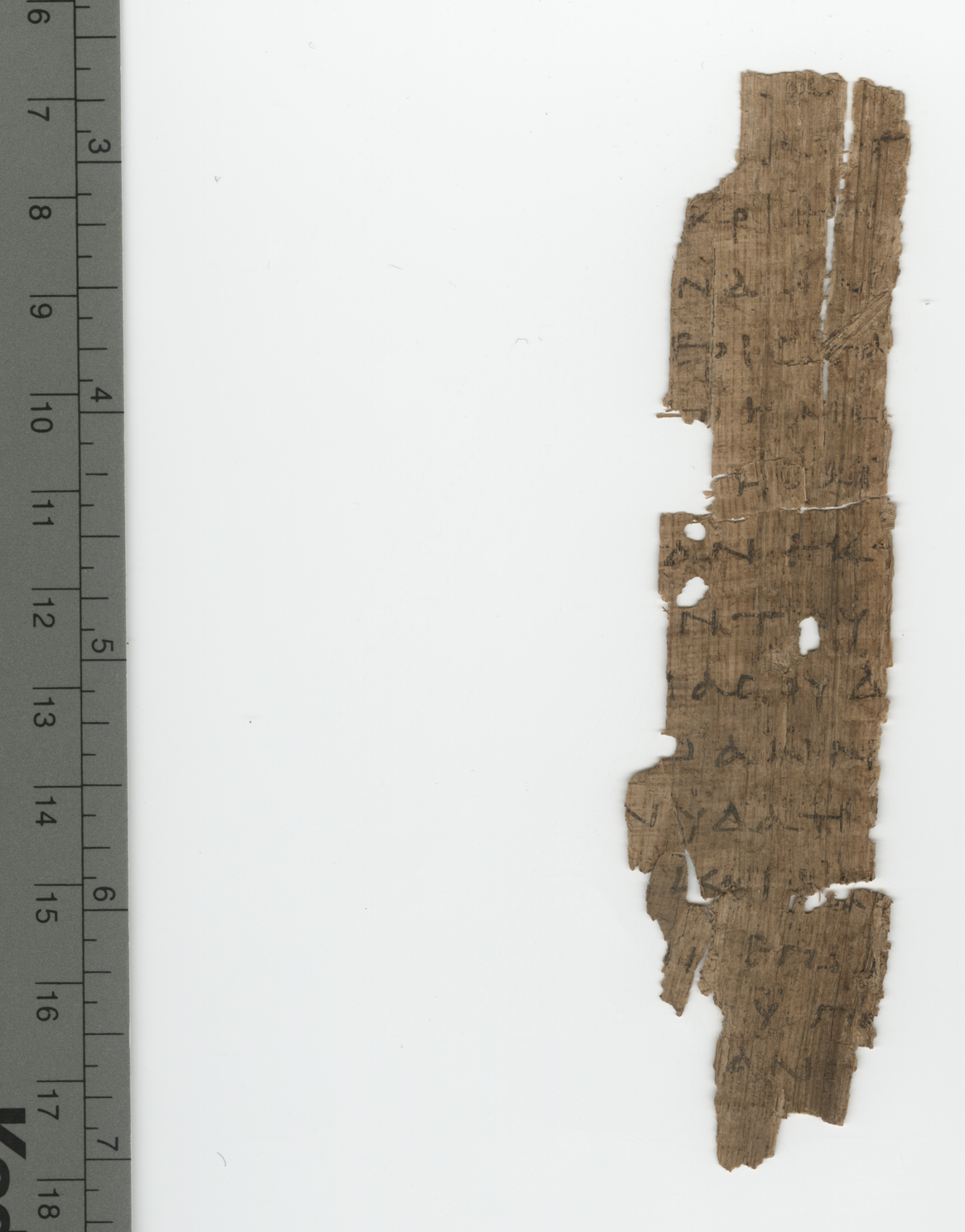
- John 1:21–28 on Papyrus 119, written about AD 250.
- Book: Gospel of John
- Christian Bible part: New Testament

John 1:25 is the twenty-fifth verse in the first chapter of the Gospel of John in the New Testament of the Christian Bible. John 1:24 is often grouped with John 1:25. Both are treated on this page.

== Content ==
=== John 1:24 ===
The interrogation is introduced in John 1:24, identifying the questioners. In the original Greek according to Westcott-Hort verse 24 reads:

Καὶ οἱ ἀπεσταλμένοι ἦσαν ἐκ τῶν Φαρισαίων.

In the King James Version the text reads:

And they which were sent were of the Pharisees.

The New International Version translates the passage as:

Now the Pharisees who had been sent.

=== John 1:25 ===
In the original Greek according to Westcott-Hort, this verse is:

Καὶ ἠρώτησαν αὐτόν, καὶ εἶπον αὐτῷ, Τί οὖν βαπτίζεις, εἰ σὺ οὐκ εἶ ὁ Χριστός, οὔτε Ἠλίας, οὔτε ὁ προφήτης;

In the King James Version of the Bible the text reads:

And they asked him, and said unto him, Why baptizest thou then, if thou be not that Christ, nor Elias, neither that prophet?

The New International Version translates the passage as:

They questioned him, "Why then do you baptize if you are not the Christ, nor Elijah, nor the Prophet?"

== Analysis ==
The scribes and Pharisees challenge John, asking by what authority he baptize publicly, and how does he acts with authority so that the people flock to him, and were subject to a baptism of Penance? MacEvilly notes that this they thought as being particularly daring on the part of John since he denied being a prophet; for the prophets foretold that when Christ would come, baptism was to be administered to the people (Ezekiel 36:25; Zechariah 13:1). And the Pharisees who were learned in the law, knew this. They supposed that such a baptism could only be done by the Messiah or by his accompanying prophet.

D. A. Carson notes that the traditional rendering of verse 24, "they which were sent were of the Pharisees" (King James Version), depends on a Greek article that most textual critics omit, and is in any case improbable, since the Pharisees were not strong enough to control the Sanhedrin (though they were influential members of it), still less to dispatch a delegation of priests and Levites. With the article omitted, Carson surveys three possible readings and prefers that of the New English Bible, "Some Pharisees who were in the deputation asked him", as entirely credible: an official delegation could probably not have been sent without some representation from the Pharisaic wing.

Craig S. Keener observes that, although the Gospel presents the "Jews" who sent the priests and Levites (John 1:19) as Pharisees (v.24), early first-century Pharisees as a group did not exercise authority over priests and Levites. Keener takes this not as evidence that the evangelist reports no historical tradition, but as a sign that he couches earlier tradition (cf. Luke 3:15) in language relevant to his own audience. He notes that some Pharisees did take part in such missions: according to Josephus, before 70 the Jerusalem leadership sent delegations that mixed priests and Pharisees (Life 28-29, 196).

On the question itself, Carson says that the Pharisees' interest is in what authorises John's baptisms. Baptism was not unknown: some Jewish groups practised proselyte baptism, and the community at Qumran invoked texts such as Ezekiel 36:25 to justify their repeated washings as a sign of the righteous end-time community. In both cases, however, the baptism was self-administered, whereas a distinctive feature of John's baptism is that he himself administered it. Carson suggests that the authority implicit in such an innovation may have prompted some Pharisees to assume that John's baptism was an end-time rite performed by an end-time figure, though he warns that the question should not be read as an unambiguous identification of the baptism as eschatological.

== Commentary from the Church Fathers ==
Origen: "The questions of the priests and Levites being answered, another mission comes from the Pharisees: And they that were sent were of the Pharisees. So far as it is allowable to form a conjecture from the discourse itself here, I should say that it was the third occasion of John’s giving his witness. Observe the mildness of the former question, so befitting the priestly and levitical character, Who art thou? There is nothing arrogant or disrespectful, but only what becomes true ministers of God. The Pharisees however, being a sectarian body, as their name implies, address the Baptist in an importunate and contumelious way. And they said, Why baptizest thou then if thou be not that Christ, neither Elias, neither that Prophet? not caring about information, but only wishing to prevent him baptizing. Yet the very next thing they did, was to come to John’s baptism. The solution of this is, that they came not in faith, but hypocritically, because they feared the people."

Chrysostom: "Or, those very same priests and Levites were of the Pharisees, and, because they could not undermine him by blandishments, began accusing, after they had compelled him to say what he was not. And they asked him, saying, Why baptizest thou then, if thou art not the Christ, neither Elias, neither that Prophet? As if it were an act of audacity in him to baptize, when he was neither the Christ, nor His precursor, nor His proclaimer, i. e. that Prophet."

Preceded by John 1:24	Gospel of John; Chapter 1	Succeeded by John 1:26
