= John 1:31 =

- ← 1:30 1:32 →
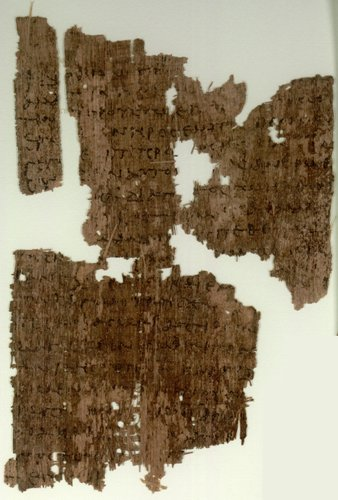
- John 1:29–35 on Papyrus 106, written in the 3rd century.
- Book: Gospel of John
- Christian Bible part: New Testament

John 1:31 is the 31st verse in the first chapter of the Gospel of John in the New Testament of the Christian Bible.

== Content ==
In the original Greek according to Westcott-Hort this verse is:

Κἀγὼ οὐκ ᾔδειν αὐτόν· ἀλλ᾿ ἵνα φανερωθῇ τῷ Ἰσραήλ, διὰ τοῦτο ἦλθον ἐγὼ ἐν τῷ ὕδατι βαπτίζων.

In the King James Version of the Bible the text reads:

And I knew him not: but that he should be made manifest to Israel, therefore am I come baptizing with water.

The New International Version translates the passage as:

I myself did not know him, but the reason I came baptizing with water was that he might be revealed to Israel."

== Analysis ==
By, "I did not know him," John seems to be saying "do not think I affirm Jesus to be the Messiah for the sake of friendship, as if he were a friend; for I say I knew Him not. That is I never saw Him, before His baptism." Although notably John did perceive Him in his mother's womb.

Carson notes that the Baptist's words "I did not know him" refer to his not having recognized Jesus as the Coming One until the sign given at Jesus' baptism, and do not imply that John had never met him.

The verse states the Fourth Gospel's purpose for John's water baptism: that Jesus "might be revealed to Israel". Carson explains that John's ministry of preaching and baptizing was ordained to prepare the way for the Coming One and to make him known to Israel. Craig Keener notes that John's baptism historically summoned Israel to repentance, and that the Fourth Gospel keeps this mission while giving it a christological focus, so that the point of the Baptist's work becomes the revealing of Israel's king to Israel (John 12:13).

== Commentary from the Church Fathers ==
Chrysostom: "That He might not seem however to give His testimony from any motive of friendship or kindred, in consequence of his being related to our Lord according to the flesh, he says, I knew Him not. John could not of course know Him, having lived in the desert. And the miraculous events of Christ’s childhood, the journey of the Magi, and such like, were now a long time past; John having been quite an infant, when they happened. And throughout the whole of the interval, He had been absolutely unknown: insomuch that John proceeds, But that He should be made manifest to Israel, therefore am I come baptizing with water. And hence it is clear that the miracles said to have been performed by Christ in His childhood, are false and fictitious. For if Jesus had performed miracles at this early age, he would not have been unknown to John, nor would the multitude have wanted a teacher to point Him out. Christ Himself then did not want baptism; nor was that washing for any other reason, than to give a sign beforehand of faith in Christ. For John saith not, in order to change men, and deliver from sin, but, that he should be made manifest in Israel, have I come baptizing. But would it not have been lawful for him to preach, and bring crowds together, without baptizing? Yes: but this was the easier way, for he would not have collected such numbers, had he preached without baptizing."

Augustine: "Now when our Lord became known, it was unnecessary to prepare a way for Him; for to those who knew Him, He became His own way. And therefore John’s baptism did not last long, but only so long as to show our Lord’s humility. . Our Lord received baptism from a servant, in order to give us such a lesson of humility as might prepare us for receiving the grace of baptism. And that the servant’s baptism might not be set before the Lord’s, others were baptized with it; who after receiving it, had to receive our Lord’s baptism: whereas those who first received our Lord’s baptism, did not receive the servant’s after."

Preceded by John 1:30	Gospel of John; Chapter 1	Succeeded by John 1:32
