= P119 =

P119 may refer to:

- Papyrus 119, a biblical manuscript
- Piaggio P.119, an Italian experimental fighter aircraft
- P119, a state regional road in Latvia
