= John 1:27 =

- ← 1:26 1:28 →
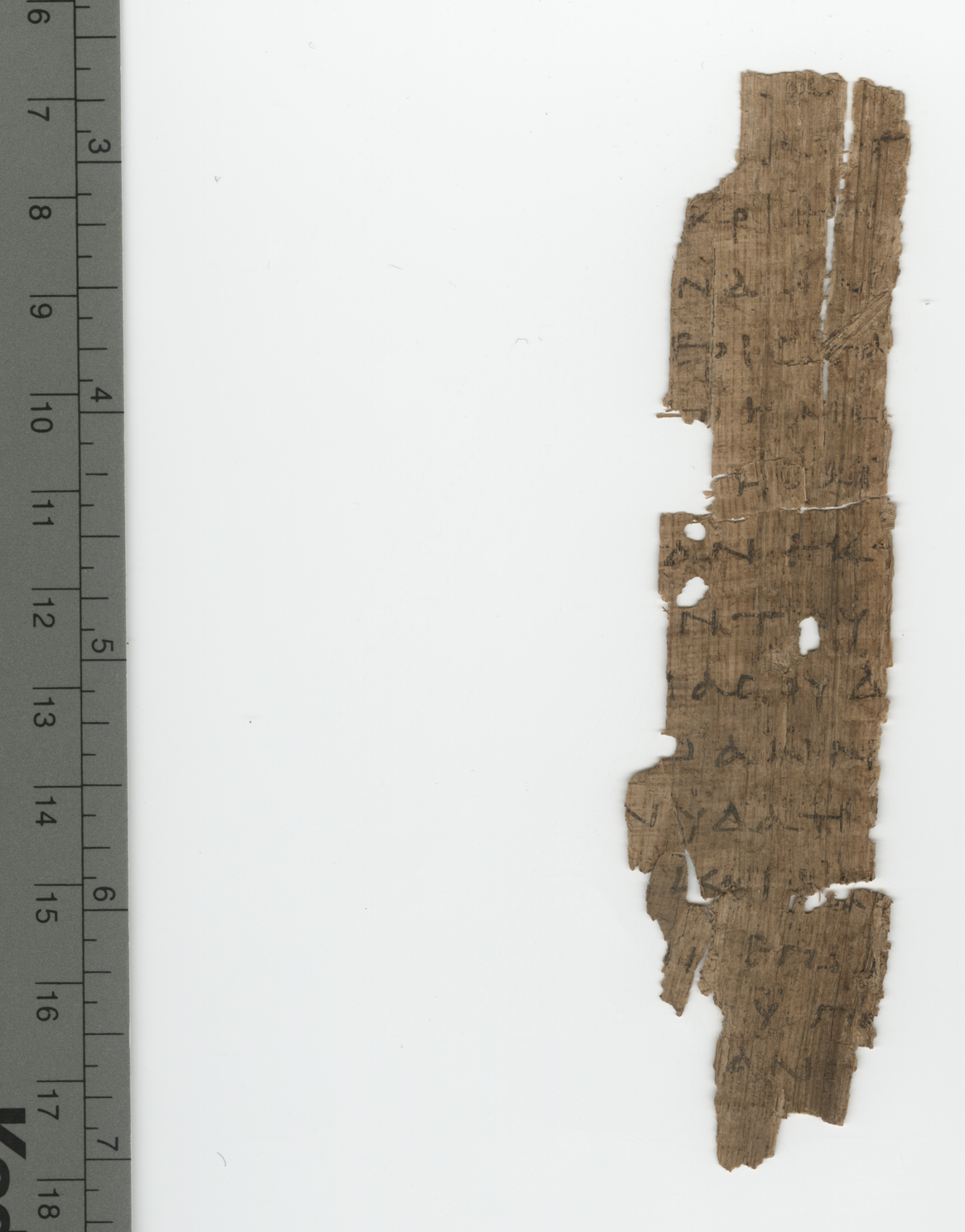
- John 1:21–28 on Papyrus 119, written about AD 250.
- Book: Gospel of John
- Christian Bible part: New Testament

John 1:27 is the twenty-seventh verse in the first chapter of the Gospel of John in the New Testament of the Christian Bible.

== Content ==
In the original Greek according to Westcott-Hort this verse is:

Αὐτός ἐστιν ὁ ὀπίσω μου ἐρχόμενος, ὃς ἔμπροσθέν μου γέγονεν· οὗ ἐγὼ οὐκ εἰμὶ ἄξιος ἵνα λύσω αὐτοῦ τὸν ἱμάντα τοῦ ὑποδήματος.

In the King James Version of the Bible the text reads:

He it is, who coming after me is preferred before me, whose shoe’s latchet I am not worthy to unloose.

The New International Version translates the passage as:

He is the one who comes after me, the thongs of whose sandals I am not worthy to untie."

== Analysis ==
"He it is who, coming after me, ..." is said to refer to Christ who will baptize, with a baptism that perfects John's. As St. Cyril of Alexandria paraphrases, “I in preparation wash with water those who are polluted with sins as a beginning of repentance, and by this means leading you from what is lower I prepare you for more lofty things. For He who is the giver of greater things, and of the highest perfection, is about to come after me.”

D. A. Carson observes that the saying repeats a theme already found in the prologue (John 1:6–8, John 1:15) and betrays extraordinary humility. In that society, a student was expected to render his teacher virtually any service a slave would perform, with one recognised limit (following David Daube): a disciple was not required to remove his teacher's sandals, as this was slaves' work. The Baptist makes no such exception for himself, and thereby defines his relation to Jesus in a manner that anticipates John 3:30.

Craig S. Keener notes that the most demeaning tasks a household servant performed involved the master's feet, such as washing them or carrying and unfastening his sandals; to do such work was to be a slave. The point is sharpened, Keener argues, by the fact that the Hebrew Bible and later tradition regularly style the prophets (Jeremiah 7:25; Amos 3:7), and figures such as Moses (Numbers 12:7; Joshua 1:2), David (2 Samuel 7:5; Psalm 89:3), the patriarchs (Exodus 32:13), and Israel itself (Isaiah 41:8), as "slaves of God", a title of honour. Against that background the prophet John claims to be unworthy even to be the coming one's slave, so exalting him in virtually divine terms.

Keener adds that this is one of the few passages where the John's Gospel and the Synoptic Gospels overlap, and it illustrates the evangelist's method. Historical tradition stands behind the saying about a superior one coming after the Baptist (Matthew 3:11; Mark 1:7; Luke 3:16); the compressed Markan version joins in a single saying the mightier coming one, the Baptist's unworthiness to untie his sandals, and the contrast of water and Spirit baptism (Mark 1:7–8), whereas the Fourth Gospel separates these components across successive verses (John 1:26, 27, 30, 33).

== Commentary from the Church Fathers ==
Gregory the Great: "Made before me, i. e. preferred before me. He comes after me, that is, He is born after me; He is made before me, that is, He is preferred to me."

Gregory the Great: "Or thus: It was a law of the old dispensation, that, if a man refused to take the woman, who of right came to him, to wife, he who by right of relationship came next to be the husband, should unloose his shoe. Now in what character did Christ appear in the world, but as Spouse of the Holy Church? (John 3:29.) John then very properly pronounced himself unworthy to unloose this shoe’s latchet: as if he said, I cannot uncover the feet of the Redeemer, for I claim not the title of spouse, which I have no right to. Or the passage may be explained in another way. We know that shoes are made out of dead animals. Our Lord then, when He came in the flesh, put on, as it were, shoes; because in His Divinity He took the flesh of our corruption, wherein we had of ourselves perished. And the latchet of the shoe, is the seal upon the mystery. John is not able to unloose the shoe’s latchet; i. e. even he cannot penetrate into the mystery of the Incarnation. So he seems to say: What wonder that He is preferred before me, Whom, being born after me, I contemplate, yet the mystery of Whose birth I comprehend not."

Chrysostom: "But lest thou shouldest think this to be the result of comparison, he immediately shows it to be a superiority beyond all comparison; Whose shoe’s latchet I am not worthy to unloose: as if He said, He is so much before me, that I am unworthy to be numbered among the lowest of His attendants: the unloosing of the sandal being the very lowest kind of service."

Augustine: "To have pronounced himself worthy even of unloosing His shoe’s latchet, he would have been thinking too much of himself."

Origen: "The place has been understood not amiss thus by a certain person; I am not of such importance, as that for my sake He should descend from this high abode, and take flesh upon Him, as it were a shoe."

Preceded by John 1:26	Gospel of John; Chapter 1	Succeeded by John 1:28
