= John 1:32 =

- ← 1:31 1:33 →
- Book: Gospel of John
- Christian Bible part: New Testament

John 1:32 is the 32nd verse in the first chapter of the Gospel of John in the New Testament of the Christian Bible.

== Content ==
In the original Greek according to Westcott-Hort this verse is:

Καὶ ἐμαρτύρησεν Ἰωάννης λέγων ὅτι Τεθέαμαι τὸ πνεῦμα καταβαῖνον ὡσεὶ περιστερὰν ἐξ οὐρανοῦ, καὶ ἔμεινεν ἐπ᾿ αὐτόν.

In the King James Version of the Bible the text reads:

And John bare record, saying, I saw the Spirit descending from heaven like a dove, and it abode upon him.

The New International Version translates the passage as:

Then John gave this testimony: "I saw the Spirit come down from heaven as a dove and remain on him.

== Analysis ==
Early church fathers are divided on the question, if this was a true dove, or merely had the appearance of a dove? Lapide believes that it was not really a dove since all the Evangelists use words such as, 'as if a dove' or 'like a dove.' This descent of the dove occurs in all four gospels, and so is thought to be a particularly significant event. Lapide also postulates that the shape of a dove was taken since "the dove is a meekest, simple, innocent, fruitful bird, very amiable, but very jealous. Such in like manner is the Holy Ghost, who endowed the soul of Christ at the very moment of His conception with these qualities of meekness and the rest."

== Commentary from the Church Fathers ==
Chrysostom: "John having made a declaration, so astonishing to all his hearers, viz. that He, whom he pointed out, did of Himself take away the sins of the world, confirms it by a reference to the Father and the Holy Spirit. For John might be asked, how did you know Him? Wherefore he replies beforehand, by the descent of the Holy Spirit: And John bare record, saying, I saw the Spirit descending from heaven like a dove, and it abode upon him."

Augustine: "This was not however the first occasion of Christ’s receiving the unction of the Holy Spirit: viz. Its descent upon Him at His baptism; wherein He condescended to prefigure His body, the Church, wherein those who are baptized receive preeminently the Holy Spirit. For it would be absurd to suppose that at thirty years old, (which was His age, when He was baptized by John,) He received for the first time the Holy Spirit: and that, when He came to that baptism, as He was without sin, so was He without the Holy Spirit. For if even of His servant and forerunner John it is written, He shall be filled with the Holy Ghost, even from His mother’s womb; if He, though sprung from His father’s seed, yet received the Holy Ghost, when as yet He was only formed in the womb; what ought we to think and believe of Christ, whose very flesh had not a carnal but spiritual conception?"

Augustine: "We do not attribute to Christ only the possession of a real body, and say that the Holy Spirit assumed a false appearance to men’s eyes: for the Holy Spirit could no more, in consistency with His nature, deceive men, than could the Son of God. The Almighty God, Who made every creature out of nothing, could as easily form a real body of a dove, without the instrumentality of other doves, as He made a real body in the womb of the Virgin, without the seed of the male."

Gregory the Great: "He saith, Abode upon Him: for the Holy Spirit visits all the faithful; but on the Mediator alone does He abide for ever in a peculiar manner; never leaving the Son’s Humanity, even as Ho proceeds Himself from the Son’s Divinity. But when the disciples are told of the same Spirit, (John 14:17.) He shall dwell with you, how is the abiding of the Spirit a peculiar sign of Christ? This will appear if we distinguish between the different gifts of the Spirit. As regards those gifts which are necessary for attaining to life, the Holy Spirit ever abides in all the elect; such are gentleness, humility, faith, hope, charity: but with respect to those, which have for their object, not our own salvation, but that of others, he does not always abide, but sometimes withdraws, and ceases to exhibit them; that men may be more humble in the possession of His gifts. But Christ had all the gifts of the Spirit, uninterruptedly always."

Chrysostom: "Should any however think that Christ really wanted the Holy Spirit, in the way that we do, he corrects this notion also, by informing us that the descent of the Holy Ghost took place only for the purpose of manifesting Christ: And I knew Him not: but He that sent me to baptize with water, the same said unto me, Upon whom thou shalt see the Spirit descending, and remaining on Him, the same is He which baptizeth with the Holy Ghost."

== See also ==
- Doves as symbols

Preceded by John 1:31	Gospel of John; Chapter 1	Succeeded by John 1:33
