= John 1:26 =

- ← 1:25 1:27 →
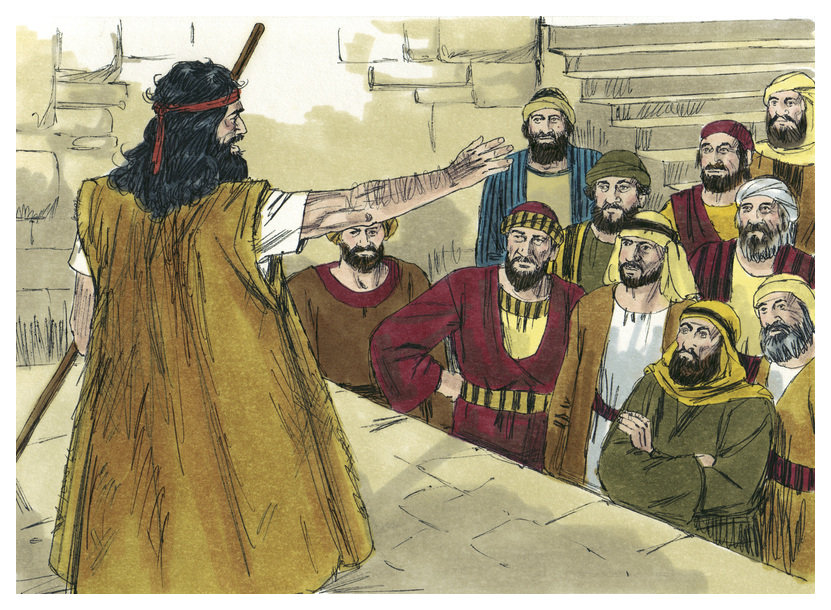
- "John the Baptist spoke to the people" (Bible Illustrations by Jim Padgett, Sweet Media, 1984).
- Book: Gospel of John
- Christian Bible part: New Testament

John 1:26 is the twenty-sixth verse in the first chapter of the Gospel of John in the New Testament of the Christian Bible.

== Content ==
In the original Greek according to Westcott-Hort, this verse is:

Ἀπεκρίθη αὐτοῖς ὁ Ἰωάννης λέγων, Ἐγὼ βαπτίζω ἐν ὕδατι· μέσος δὲ ὑμῶν ἕστηκεν ὃν ὑμεῖς οὐκ οἴδατε.

In the King James Version of the Bible the text reads:

John answered them, saying, I baptize with water: but there standeth one among you, whom ye know not;

The New International Version translates the passage as:

"I baptize with water," John replied, "but among you stands one you do not know".

== Analysis ==
Lapide comments on John's words, "there standeth one, etc." stating that it is as if John said, "Christ is living in the midst of you, and yet you do not know Him. That is, you see him as a mere man and do not perceive that he is the Messiah."

D. A. Carson notes that the emphatic "I baptize with water" (v.26) might lead the unwary reader, recalling the Synoptic parallels (Matthew 3:11; Mark 1:7–8; Luke 3:16), to expect the "I" to serve merely as a foil for the one who will baptize in the Holy Spirit. The Baptist does make that point later (v.33), but Carson argues that here he takes the authority question raised by the Pharisees and immediately turns it into a matter of bearing witness to the hidden Messiah. His baptism is designed to prepare the people for Jesus. Carson adds that the Baptist is aware of the genuine authority he holds and will shortly speak of "the one who sent me to baptize" (v.33), that is, God. Therefore whatever stature entitles him to say "I baptize with water" is small in comparison with the stature of one who still stands unrecognised among the people, "one you do not know".

Craig S. Keener observes that the interlocutors' failure to "know" the one among them (οὐκ οἴδατε) links them with the unbelieving world of the prologue, which likewise "knew him not" (John 1:10, οὐκ ἔγνω). The same lack of recognition recurs in the following narrative (John 2:9). Against this failure Keener sets John 1:33 (οὐκ ᾔδειν), where the Spirit enables the Baptist, and by extension others, to recognise the one his questioners cannot.

On the water imagery, Keener notes that in ancient agrarian society water lent itself to a wide figurative range, serving as a symbol for life and, in some hands, for oracular speech. Philo read the four rivers of Genesis as the four virtues flowing from the divine word, and both he and Ben Sira depict divine Wisdom as water, as do later rabbinic texts for Wisdom, Torah, and teaching. Keener observes in this, John's Gospel, the Spirit with water are often compared (John 7:37–39).

== Commentary from the Church Fathers ==
Gregory the Great: "A saint, even when perversely questioned, is never diverted from the pursuit of goodness. Thus John to the words of envy opposes the words of life: John answered them, saying, I indeed baptize with water."

Gregory the Great: "John baptizeth not with the Spirit, but with water; not being able to remit sins, he washes the bodies of the baptized with water, but not their souls with pardon. Why then doth he baptize, when he doth not remit sins by baptism? To maintain his character of forerunner. As his birth preceded our Lord’s, so doth his baptism precede our Lord’s baptism. And he who was the forerunner of Christ in His preaching, is forerunner also in His baptism, which was the imitation of that Sacrament. And withal he announces the mystery of our redemption, saying that He, the Redeemer, is standing in the midst of men, and they know it not: There standeth one among you, whom ye know not: for our Lord, when He appeared in the flesh, was visible in body, but in majesty invisible."

Origen: "For how would the question, Why then baptizest thou, be replied to in any other way, than by setting forth the carnal nature of his own baptism?"

Augustine: "In His low estate He was not seen; and therefore the candle was lighted."

Theophylact of Ohrid: "Or it was, that our Lord was in the midst of the Pharisees; and they not knowing Him. For they thought that they knew the Scriptures, and therefore, inasmuch as our Lord was pointed out there, He was in the midst of them, i. e. in their hearts. But they knew Him not, inasmuch as they understood not the Scriptures. Or take another interpretation. He was in the midst of them, as mediator between God and man, wishing to bring them, the Pharisees, to God. But they knew Him not."

Chrysostom: "One among you. It was fitting that Christ should mix with the people, and be one of the many, showing every where His humility. Whom ye know not; i. e. not, in the most absolute and certain sense; not, who He is, and whence Ho is."

Chrysostom: "As if he said, Do not think that every thing is contained in my baptism; for if my baptism were perfect, another would not come after me with another baptism. This baptism of mine is but an introduction to the other, and will soon pass away, like a shadow, or an image. There is One coming after me to establish the truth: and therefore this is not a perfect baptism; for, if it were, there would be no room for a second: and therefore he adds, Who is made before me: i. e. is more honourable, more lofty."

Preceded by John 1:25	Gospel of John; Chapter 1	Succeeded by John 1:27
