= John 1:29 =

- ← 1:28 1:30 →
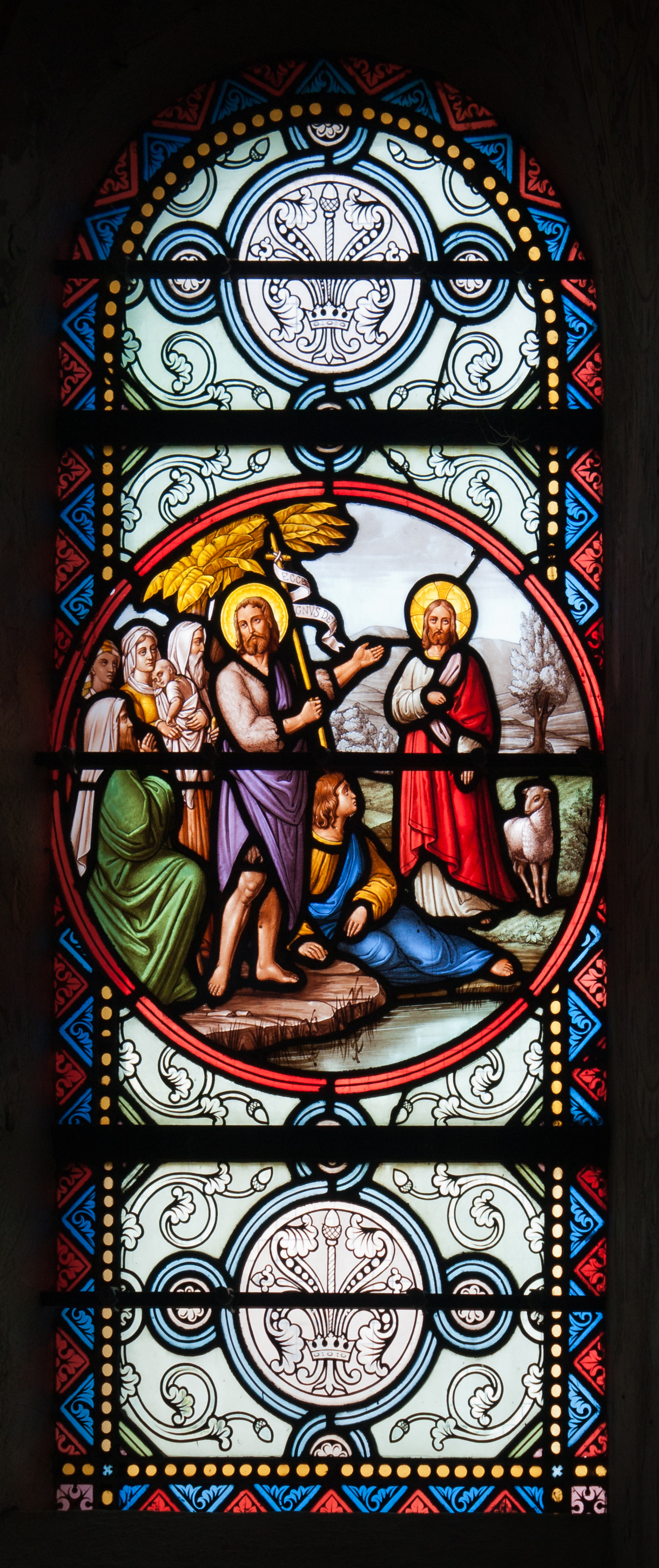
- A window of Église Saint-Martin, Réthoville, Manche, Basse-Normandie, France, depicting John 1:29: Saint John the Baptist carries a staff with an attached scroll which reads ECCE AGNUS DEI.
- Book: Gospel of John
- Christian Bible part: New Testament

John 1:29 is the twenty-ninth verse in the first chapter of the Gospel of John in the New Testament of the Christian Bible.

== Content ==
In the original Greek according to Westcott-Hort this verse is:

Τῇ ἐπαύριον βλέπει ὁ Ἰωάννης τὸν Ἰησοῦν ἐρχόμενον πρὸς αὐτόν, καὶ λέγει, Ἴδε ὁ ἀμνὸς τοῦ Θεοῦ, ὁ αἴρων τὴν ἁμαρτίαν τοῦ κόσμου.

In the King James Version of the Bible, the text reads:

The next day John seeth Jesus coming unto him, and saith, Behold the Lamb of God, which taketh away the sin of the world.

The New International Version translates the passage as:

The next day John saw Jesus coming toward him and said, "Look, the Lamb of God, who takes away the sin of the world!

== Analysis ==
Jesus retired into the desert immediately after his Baptism by John in the Markan account (Mark 1:12). Robert Witham notes that it is thought he was probably coming from there when the Baptist gave this testimony: "Behold!" "The Lamb of God" refers to Isaiah 53:7 and Jeremiah 11:19, in which Christ is called a lamb. This was prefigured by the lamb offered up in daily sacrifices by the Jewish people for legal oblations, including the Passover. It is "of God", for it is offered up by God the Son, to the Father, "for the world".

Some paraphrases adopt the plural wording "sins of the world", for example J. B. Phillips in his New Testament in Modern English. Carson takes the sacrifice to extend beyond the Jewish people to all human beings without distinction, though, as the prologue has already indicated (John 1:11–12), not to all without exception.

=== Background of the title "Lamb of God" ===
The background of the title "Lamb of God" is a long-standing question in critical scholarship, and commentators list several Old Testament and Jewish antecedents. D. A. Carson canvasses the gentle lamb of Jeremiah 11:19, the lamb of the daily temple sacrifice, the scapegoat of Leviticus 16, the lamb provided in place of Isaac at Genesis 22, the guilt offering, the Servant of Isaiah 53 who is led like a lamb to the slaughter, the Passover lamb, and the triumphant apocalyptic lamb of some Jewish texts and the Book of Revelation. Craig Keener groups the proposals into four principal backgrounds: apocalyptic lambs, the lamb of Isaiah 53:7, and Passover and sacrificial lambs, which he treats together.

Keener judges the Passover lamb to be the primary background. He notes that the Septuagint uses ἀμνός (amnos), the word used here, for sacrificial lambs about a hundred times, and that the Fourth Gospel later presents Jesus' death in Passover terms, timing the crucifixion to the slaughter of the Passover lambs and noting that no bone of Jesus was broken (John 19:36). On this reading the clause "who takes away the sin of the world" gives the Passover lamb a sacrificial, sin-bearing sense.

Carson observes that "Lamb of God" was not an obvious messianic title before Jesus' death, which has led many modern interpreters to treat the saying as the Evangelist's own composition, doubting that John the Baptist spoke it, especially since the Synoptic Gospels present the Baptist as unprepared for a suffering Messiah (Matthew 11:2–19). Carson's own reconstruction is that the Baptist, who looked for a coming judgment, probably had in mind the triumphant apocalyptic lamb attested in some Jewish texts, while the Evangelist, writing after the resurrection, understood the same words in the fuller sense of Jesus' atoning death. Keener similarly regards the wording as a Johannine formulation while holding that it is consistent with the Baptist's historical witness to Jesus.

Carson notes that the verb αἴρων (airōn, "takes away") is a more open word than the specifically sacrificial ἀναφέρω (anapherō), "to bear away in an atoning death", and that the Evangelist's choice preserves the ambiguity of the saying. Keener connects the expression with the Johannine motif of Jesus being "lifted up" on the cross (John 3:14, John 12:32), so that sin is taken away as it is lifted up with him.

== Commentary from the Church Fathers ==
Thomas Aquinas assembled the following quotations regarding this verse from the early Fathers of the Church:

- Origen: "After this testimony, Jesus is seen coming to John, not only persevering in his confession, but also advanced in goodness: as is intimated by the second day. Wherefore it is said, The next day John seeth Jesus coming to him. Long before this, the Mother of Jesus, as soon as she had conceived Him, went to see the mother of John then pregnant; and as soon as the sound of Mary's salutation reached the ears of Elisabeth, John leaped in the womb: but now the Baptist himself after his testimony seeth Jesus coming. Men are first prepared by hearing from others, and then see with their own eyes. The example of Mary going to see Elisabeth her inferior, and the Son of God going to see the Baptist, should teach us modesty and fervent charity to our inferiors. What place the Saviour came from when He came to the Baptist we are not told here; but we find it in Matthew, Then cometh Jesus from Galilee to Jordan unto John to be baptized of him. (Matt. 3:13)"
- Chrysostom: "Or; Matthew relates directly Christ’s coming to His baptism, John His coming a second time subsequent to His baptism, as appears from what follows: I saw the Spirit descending, &c. The Evangelists have divided the periods of the history between them; Matthew passing over the part before John’s imprisonment, and hastening to that event; John chiefly dwelling on what took place before the imprisonment. Thus he says, The next day John seeth Jesus coming to him. But why did He come to him the next day after His baptism? Having been baptized with the multitude, He wished to prevent any from thinking that He came to John for the same reason that others did, viz. to confess His sins, and be washed in the river unto repentance. He comes therefore to give John an opportunity of correcting this mistake; which John accordingly did correct; viz. by those words, Behold the Lamb of God, which taketh away the sin of the world. For He Who was so pure, as to be able to absolve other men’s sins, evidently could not have come thither for the sake of confessing His own; but only to give John an opportunity of speaking of Him. He came too the next day, that those who had heard the former testimonies of John, might hear them again more plainly; and other besides. For he saith, Behold the Lamb of God, signifying that He was the one of old sought after, and reminding them of the prophecy of Isaiah, and of the shadows of the Mosaic law, in order that through the figure he might the easier lead them to the substance."
- Augustine: "If the Lamb of God is innocent, and John is the lamb, must he not be innocent? But all men come of that stock of which David sings sorrowing, Behold, I was conceived in wickedness. (Psalm 51:5) He then alone was the Lamb, who was not thus conceived; for He was not conceived in wickedness, nor in sin did His mother bear Him in her womb, Whom a virgin conceived, a virgin brought forth, because that in faith she conceived, and in faith received."
- Theophylact of Ohrid: "He is called the Lamb of God, because God the Father accepted His death for our salvation, or, in other words, because He delivered Him up to death for our sakes. For just as we say, This is the offering of such a man, meaning the offering made by him; in the same sense Christ is called the Lamb of God Who gave His Son to die for our salvation. And whereas that typical lamb did not take away any man’s sin, this one hath taken away the sin of the whole world, rescuing it from the danger it was in from the wrath of God. Behold Him1 Who taketh away the sin of the world: he saith not, who will take, but, Who taketh away the sin of the world; as if He were always doing this. For He did not then only take it away when He suffered, but from that time to the present, He taketh it away; not by being always crucified, for He made one sacrifice for sins, but by ever washing it by means of that sacrifice."
- Gregory the Great: "But then only will sin be entirely taken away from the human race, when our corruption has been turned to a glorious incorruption. We cannot be free from sin, so long as we are held in the death of the body."
- Theophylact of Ohrid: "Why does he say the sin of the world, not sins? Because he wished to express sin universally: just as we say commonly, that man was cast out of paradise; meaning the whole human race."
- Glossa Ordinaria: "Or by the sin of the world is meant original sin, which is common to the whole world: which original sin, as well as the sins of everyone individually, Christ by His grace remits."
- Augustine: "For He Who took not sin from our nature, He it is Who taketh away our sin. Some say, We take away the sins of men, because we are holy; for if he, who baptizes, is not holy, how can he take away the other’s sin, seeing he himself is full of sin? Against these reasoners let us point to the text; Behold Him Who taketh away the sin of the world; in order to do away with such presumption in man towards man."
- Origen: "As there was a connexion between the other sacrifices of the law, and the daily sacrifice of the lamb, in the same way the sacrifice of this Lamb has its reflection in the pouring out of the blood of the Martyrs, by whose patience, confession, and zeal for goodness, the machinations of the ungodly are frustrated."

== Uses ==
=== Music ===
The King James Version of this verse is cited as texts in the English-language oratorio "Messiah" by George Frideric Handel (HWV 56).

Preceded by John 1:28	Gospel of John; Chapter 1	Succeeded by John 1:30
