= Uncial 0101 =

- New Testament manuscript
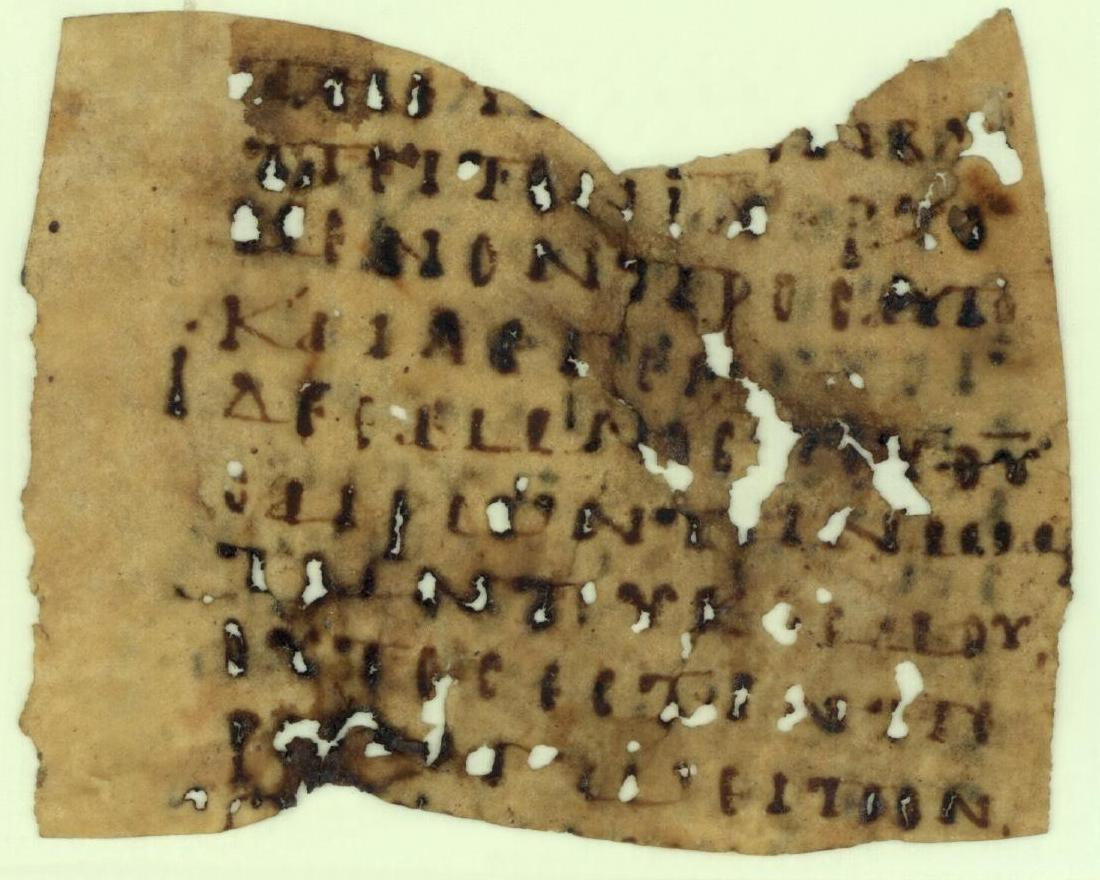
- John 1:29-30
- Text: Gospel of John 1:29-32 †
- Date: 8th-century
- Script: Greek
- Now at: Austrian National Library
- Size: 11 cm by 9 cm
- Type: Alexandrian text-type
- Category: II

Uncial 0101 (in the Gregory-Aland numbering), ε 48 (Soden), is a Greek uncial manuscript of the New Testament. It is dated palaeographically to the 8th-century. Formerly it was labelled by T^{V}. The manuscript has survived in very fragmentary condition.

== Description ==
The codex contains a small part of the Gospel of John 1:29-32, on one very small parchment leaf (11 cm by 9 cm). The text is written in one column per page, 14 lines per page, in uncial letters.

The nomina sacra are written in an abbreviated forms.

== Text ==
recto ΤΗΕΠ[αυρι]ΟΝΒΛΕ ΠΕΙΤΟΝΙ̅Ν̅ΕΡΧΟ ΜΕΝΟΝΠΡΟΣΑΥΤΟ ΚΑΙΛΕΓΕΙ ΔΕΟΑΜΝΟΣΤΟΥΘ̅Υ̅ ΕΝΤ[ωυδατ]ΙΒΑΠΤΙΖΩ ΟΑΙΡΩΝΤΠΝΑΜΑΡ	verso ΚΑΓΩ[ουκ η]ΔΕΙΝΑΥ ΤΟΝΑΛΛΙΝΑΦΑΝΕ ΡΩΘΗΤΩΙ̅Σ̅Λ̅ΔΙΑ ΤΟΥΤΟΗΛΘΟΝΕΓΩ ΚΑΙ[εμαρ]ΤΥΡΗΣΕ

recto ΤΙΑΝΤΟΥΚΟΣΜΟΥ ΟΥΤΟΣΕΣΤΙΝΠΕ ΡΙΟΥΕΓΩΕΙΠΟΝ ΟΠ	verso ΙΩΑΝΝΗΣΛΕΓΩΝ ΟΤΙΤΕΘΕΑΜΑΙΤΟΠ̅Ν̅Α̅ ΚΑΤΑΒΑΟΝΟΝΩΣΕΙ ΠΕΡ[ιστεραν.....] [.....]Ν

The Greek text of this codex is a representative of the Alexandrian text-type. Aland placed it in Category II.

== History ==
Currently it is dated by the INTF to the 8th-century.

The codex currently is located at the Austrian National Library (Pap. G. 39780), at Vienna.

Karl Wessely published its text (facsimile). It was examined by C. R. Gregory (1887) and David C. Parker (2007). In 2008 it was edited by Stanley E. Porter and Wendy J. Porter (facsimile with transcription).

== See also ==
- List of New Testament uncials
- Textual criticism
