= Papyrus 106 =

- New Testament manuscript
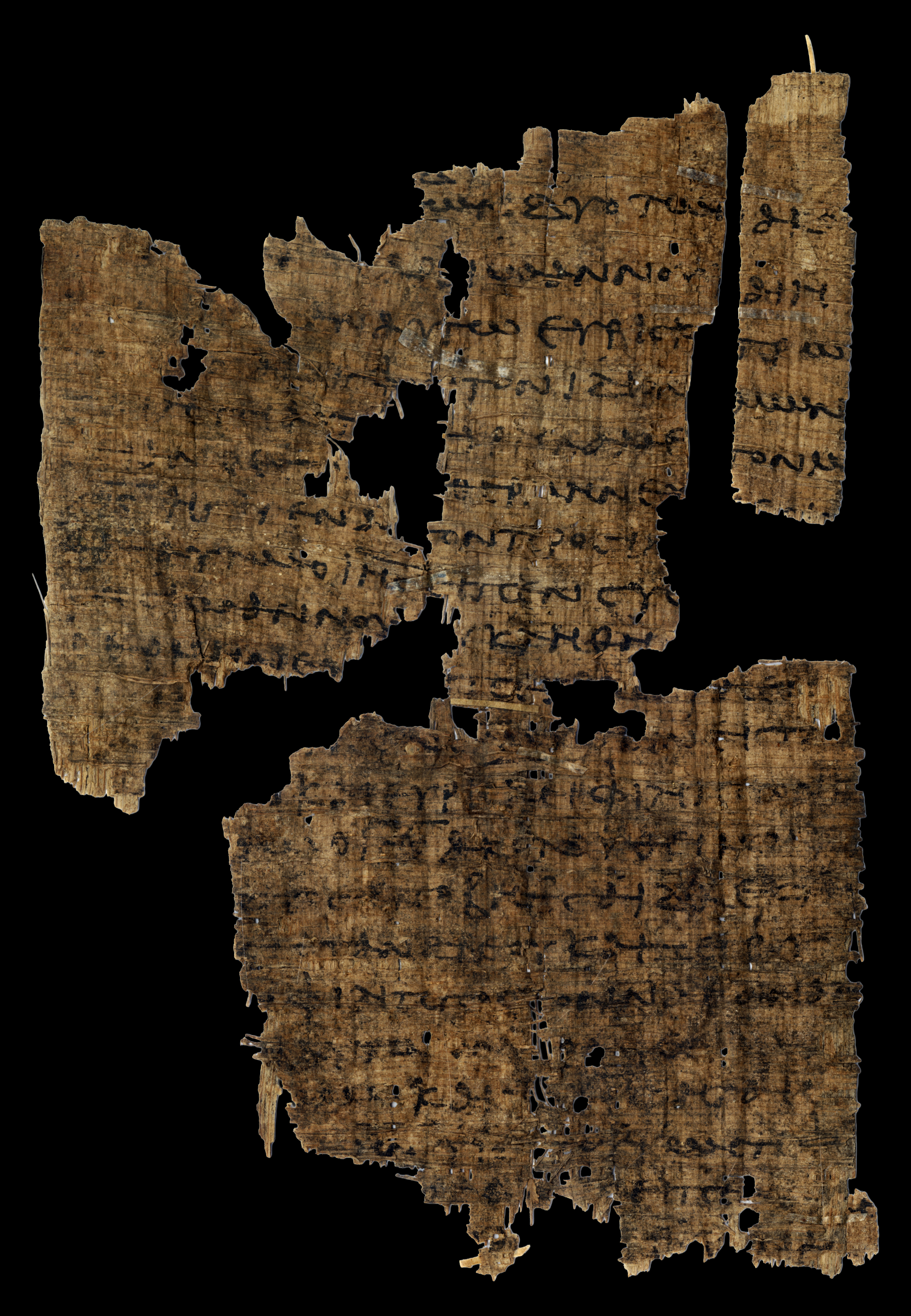
- Recto, John 1:40-46
- Name: P. Oxy. 4445
- Sign: 𝔓^{106}
- Text: Gospel of John 1:29-35; 1:40-46
- Date: 3rd century
- Script: Greek
- Found: Oxyrhynchus, Egypt
- Now at: Sackler Library
- Cite: W. E. H. Cockle, OP LXIV (1997), pp. 11-14
- Size: 13 x 8.8 cm
- Type: Alexandrian text-type
- Category: I

Papyrus 106 is a fragmentary manuscript of the Gospel of John from the New Testament in Greek written on papyrus. It contains text from John 1:29-35 & 1:40-46. It is designated by the siglum 𝔓^{106} in the Gregory-Aland numbering of New Testament manuscripts. Using the study of comparative writing styles (palaeography), it has been assigned to the early 3rd century. The manuscript is currently housed at the Sackler Library (Papyrology Rooms, shelf number P. Oxy. 4445) at Oxford University in Oxford, England.

== Description ==
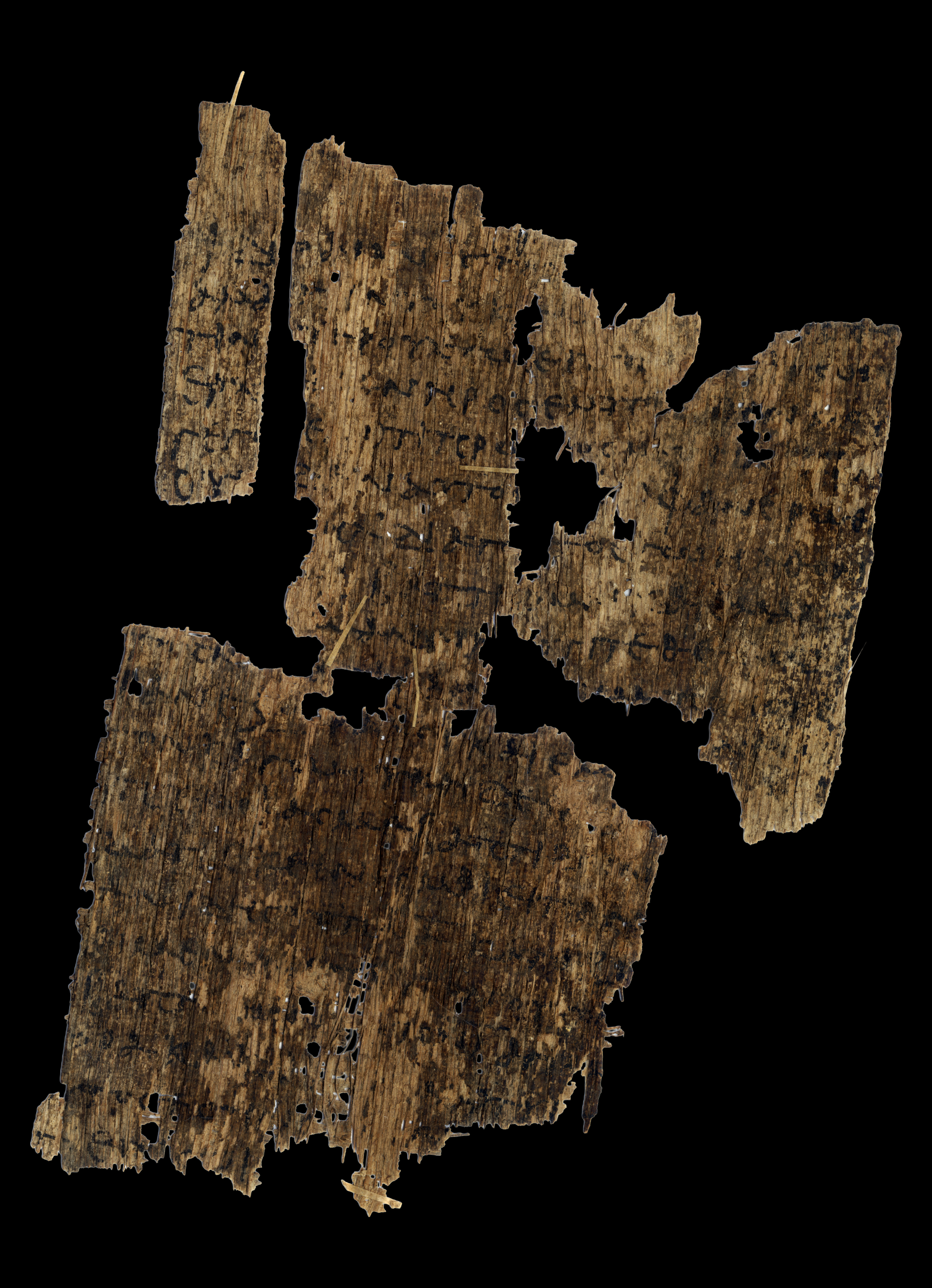
Verso, John 1:29-35

The manuscript is made of papyrus, and originally would have been around 12.5 cm x 23 cm in size, with about 35 lines per page. Due to pagination being extant (gamma/Γ (=3) on the front and delta/Δ (=4) on the reverse of the leaf), this indicates that the manuscript was either a single codex of John, or had John at the beginning of a collection.

== Textual Character ==
Despite its fragmentary nature, the text of the manuscript is considered a representative of the Alexandrian text-type (or rather proto-Alexandrian), bearing familiarity to 𝔓^{66}, 𝔓^{75}, Codex Sinaiticus (א), and Vaticanus (B). The text-types are groups of different New Testament manuscripts which share specific or generally related readings, which then differ from each other group, and thus the conflicting readings can separate out the groups. These are then used to determine the original text as published; there are three main groups with names: Alexandrian, Western, and Byzantine.

=== Some notable readings ===
Below are some readings of the manuscript and how they relate to other manuscripts of the New Testament.

John 1:30:

υπερ (on behalf of): 𝔓^{106} 𝔓^{5} 𝔓^{66} 𝔓^{75} א* B C* W^{s} pc
περι (concerning): א^{2} A C^{3} L Θ Ψ 0101 ƒ^{1} ƒ^{13} 33 $\mathfrak{M}$; Epiph

John 1:32 (1)

λεγων (saying)

omit. : 𝔓^{106} א*
incl. : 𝔓^{55} 𝔓^{66} 𝔓^{75} א^{1} A B C

John 1:32 (2)

καταβαινον ως περιστεραν (descended as a dove): 𝔓^{106} 𝔓^{55} 𝔓^{75} A B C
καταβαινον ωσει περιστερὰν (descended as if like a dove) : 𝔓^{66} K P Δ 0101 ƒ^{1} ƒ^{13} 700 892 1241 1424 l 2211 pm
ως περιστεραν καταβαινον (as a dove descended) : א

John 1:34

εκλεκτος (chosen) : 𝔓^{106} 𝔓^{5} א* b e ff^{2} Syriac Curetonian (sy^{c s}).
υ̅ς̅ (υιος) (son) : 𝔓^{66} 𝔓^{75} א^{2} A B C D W Θ Ψ 083

John 1:42

ιωαννου (of John) : 𝔓^{106} 𝔓^{66} 𝔓^{75} א B* L W^{s} 33 pc it co
ιωαννα (to John) : Θ 1241 pc vg
ιωνα (Jonah) : A B^{2} Ψ ƒ^{1} ƒ^{13} $\mathfrak{M}$ c q vg^{cl} sy bo^{ms}; Epiph

John 1:45

ναζαρεθ (Nazareth) : 𝔓^{106} 𝔓^{75} $\mathfrak{M}$
ναζαρετ (Nazaret) : 𝔓^{66} א A B

John 1:46

ναζαρεθ (Nazareth) : 𝔓^{106} 𝔓^{75} $\mathfrak{M}$
ναζαρετ (Nazaret) : 𝔓^{66} א A B

== See also ==
- List of New Testament papyri
- Oxyrhynchus Papyri
