= John 1:33 =

- ← 1:32 1:34 →
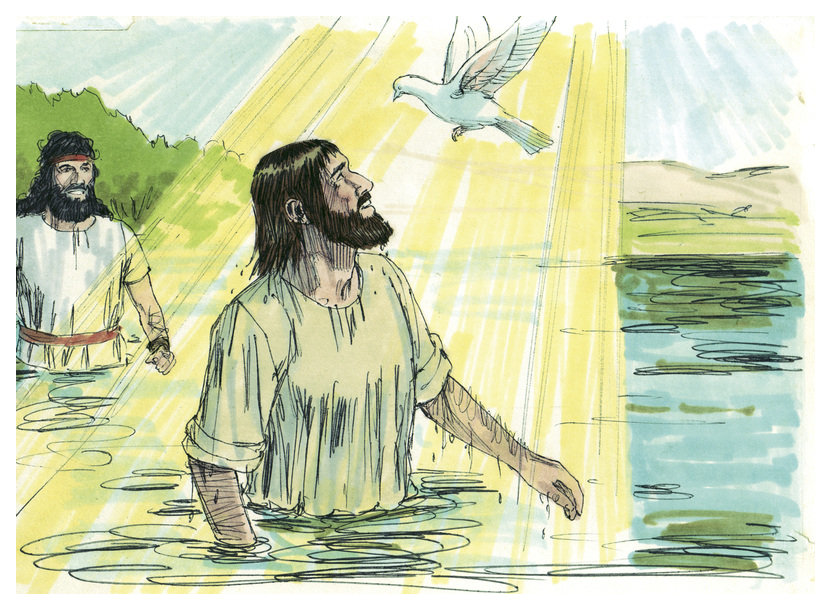
- "John the Baptist witnessed the Spirit descended upon Jesus" (Bible Illustrations by Jim Padgett, Sweet Media, 1984).
- Book: Gospel of John
- Christian Bible part: New Testament

John 1:33 is the 33rd verse in the first chapter of the Gospel of John in the New Testament of the Christian Bible.

== Content ==
In the original Greek according to Westcott-Hort this verse is:

Κἀγὼ οὐκ ᾔδειν αὐτόν· ἀλλ᾿ ὁ πέμψας με βαπτίζειν ἐν ὕδατι, ἐκεῖνός μοι εἶπεν, Ἐφ᾿ ὃν ἂν ἴδῃς τὸ πνεῦμα καταβαῖνον καὶ μένον ἐπ᾿ αὐτόν, οὗτός ἐστιν ὁ βαπτίζων ἐν πνεύματι ἁγίῳ.

In the King James Version of the Bible the text reads:

And I knew him not: but he that sent me to baptize with water, the same said unto me, Upon whom thou shalt see the Spirit descending, and remaining on him, the same is he which baptizeth with the Holy Ghost.

The New International Version translates the passage as:

I would not have known him, except that the one who sent me to baptize with water told me, 'The man on whom you see the Spirit come down and remain is he who will baptize with the Holy Spirit.'

== Analysis ==
MacEvilly comments on the phrase "I knew Him not," saying that since John had been in the wilderness he did not personally know Christ. However God, who sent him to baptize, revealed Jesus apart from the large crowds by divine revelation in the same way that he revealed him in his mother's womb to John. And so John responded with the words of Matthew 3:14, "I ought to be baptized by you."

== Commentary from the Church Fathers ==
Augustine: "But who sent John? If we say the Father, we say true; if we say the Son, we say true. But it would be truer to say, the Father and the Son. How then knew he not Him, by Whom he was sent? For if he knew not Him, by Whom he wished to be baptized, it was rash in him to say, I have need to be baptized by Thee. So then he knew Him; and why saith he, I knew Him not?"

Chrysostom: "When he saith, I knew Him not, he is speaking of time past, not of the time of his baptism, when he forbad Him, saying, I have need to be baptized of Thee."

Augustine: "Let us turn to the other Evangelists, who relate the matter more clearly, and we shall find most satisfactorily, that the dove descended when our Lord ascended from the water. If then the dove descended after baptism, but John said before the baptism, I have need to be baptized of Thee, he knew Him before His baptism also. How then said he, I knew him not, but He which sent me to baptize? Was this the first revelation made to John of Christ's person, or was it not rather a fuller disclosure of what had been already revealed? John knew the Lord to be the Son of God, knew that He would baptize with the Holy Ghost: for before Christ came to the river, many having come together to hear John, he said unto them, He that comes after me is mightier than I: He shall baptize you with the Holy Ghost and with fire. (Matt. 3:11) What then? He did not know that our Lord (lest Paul or Peter might say, my baptism, as we find Paul did say, my Gospel,) would have and retain to Himself the power of baptism, the ministering of it however passing to good and bad indiscriminately. What hindrance is the badness of the minister, when the Lord is good? So then we baptize again after John's baptism; after a homicide's we baptize not: because John gave his own baptism, the homicide gives Christ's; which is so holy a sacrament, that not even a homicide's ministration can pollute it. Our Lord could, had He so willed, have given power to any servant of His to give baptism as it were in His own stead; and to the baptism, thus transferred to the servant, have imparted the same power, that it would have had, when given by Himself. But this He did not choose to do; that the hope of the baptized might be directed to Him, Who had baptized them; He wished not the servant to place hope in the servant. And again, had He given this power to servants, there would have been as many baptisms as servants; as there had been the baptism of John, so should we have had the baptism of Paul and of Peter. It is by this power then, which Christ retains in His own possession exclusively, that the unity of the Church is established; of which it is said, My dove is one. (Cant. 6:9) A man may have a baptism besides the dove; but that any besides the dove should profit, is impossible."

Chrysostom: "The Father having sent forth a voice proclaiming the Son, the Holy Spirit came besides, bringing the voice upon the head of Christ, in order that no one present might think that what was said of Christ, was said of John. But it will be asked: How was it that the Jews believed not, if they saw the Spirit? Such sights however require the mental vision, rather than the bodily. If those who saw Christ working miracles were so drunken with malice, that they denied what their own eyes had seen, how could the appearance of the Holy Spirit in the form of a dove overcome their incredulity? Some say however that the sight was not visible to all, but only to John, and the more devotional part. But even if the descent of the Spirit, as a dove, was visible to the outward eye, it does not follow that because all saw it, all understood it. Zacharias himself, Daniel, Ezechiel, and Moses saw many things, appearing to their senses, which no one else saw: and therefore John adds, And I saw and bare record that this is the Son of God. He had called Him the Lamb before, and said that He would baptize with the Spirit; but he had no where called Him the Son before."

Preceded by John 1:32	Gospel of John; Chapter 1	Succeeded by John 1:34
