= Papyrus 119 =

- New Testament manuscript
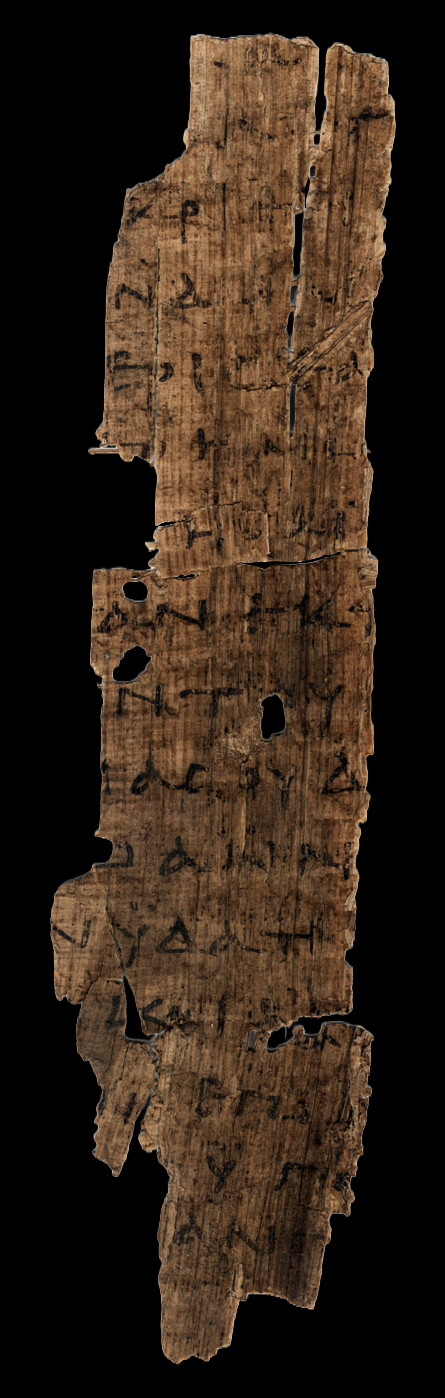
- Recto, John 1:21-28
- Name: P. Oxy. 4803
- Sign: 𝔓^{119}
- Text: Gospel of John 1:21-28,38-44
- Date: 3rd century
- Script: Greek
- Found: Oxyrhynchus, Egypt
- Now at: Ashmolean Museum
- Cite: R. Hatzilambrou, P. J. Parsons, J. Chapa, OP LXXI (2007), pp. 2-6.
- Size: [25] x [14] cm
- Type: Alexandrian (?)
- Category: -

Papyrus 119 (in the Gregory-Aland numbering), designated by 𝔓^{119}, is an early copy of a small part of the New Testament in Greek found among the Oxyrhynchus Papyri. It is a manuscript of the Gospel of John.

== Surviving texts ==
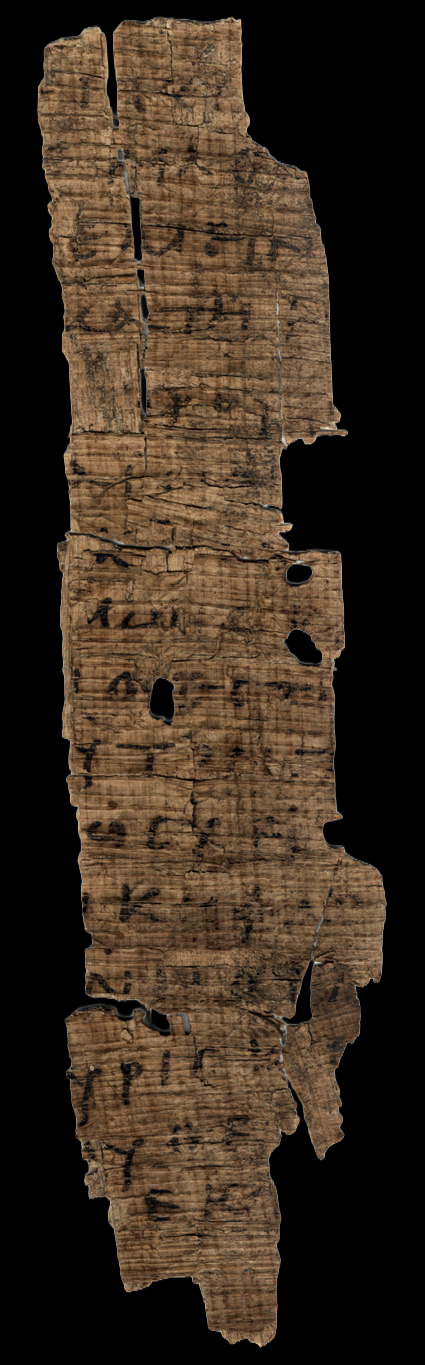
Verso, John 1:38-44

The surviving texts of John are verses 1:21-28, 38-44. They are in a fragmentary condition.

== Assignation ==
The manuscript paleographically has been assigned to the early 3rd century (INTF).

== Characteristics ==
The text is written with one column per page, and 16 lines per page. 40 lines have been reconstructed.

Location

The manuscript is currently housed at the Papyrology Rooms of the Ashmolean Museum at Oxford with the shelf number P. Oxy. 4803.

== See also ==
- List of New Testament papyri
- Oxyrhynchus Papyri
