= John 1:45 =

- ← 1:44 1:46 →
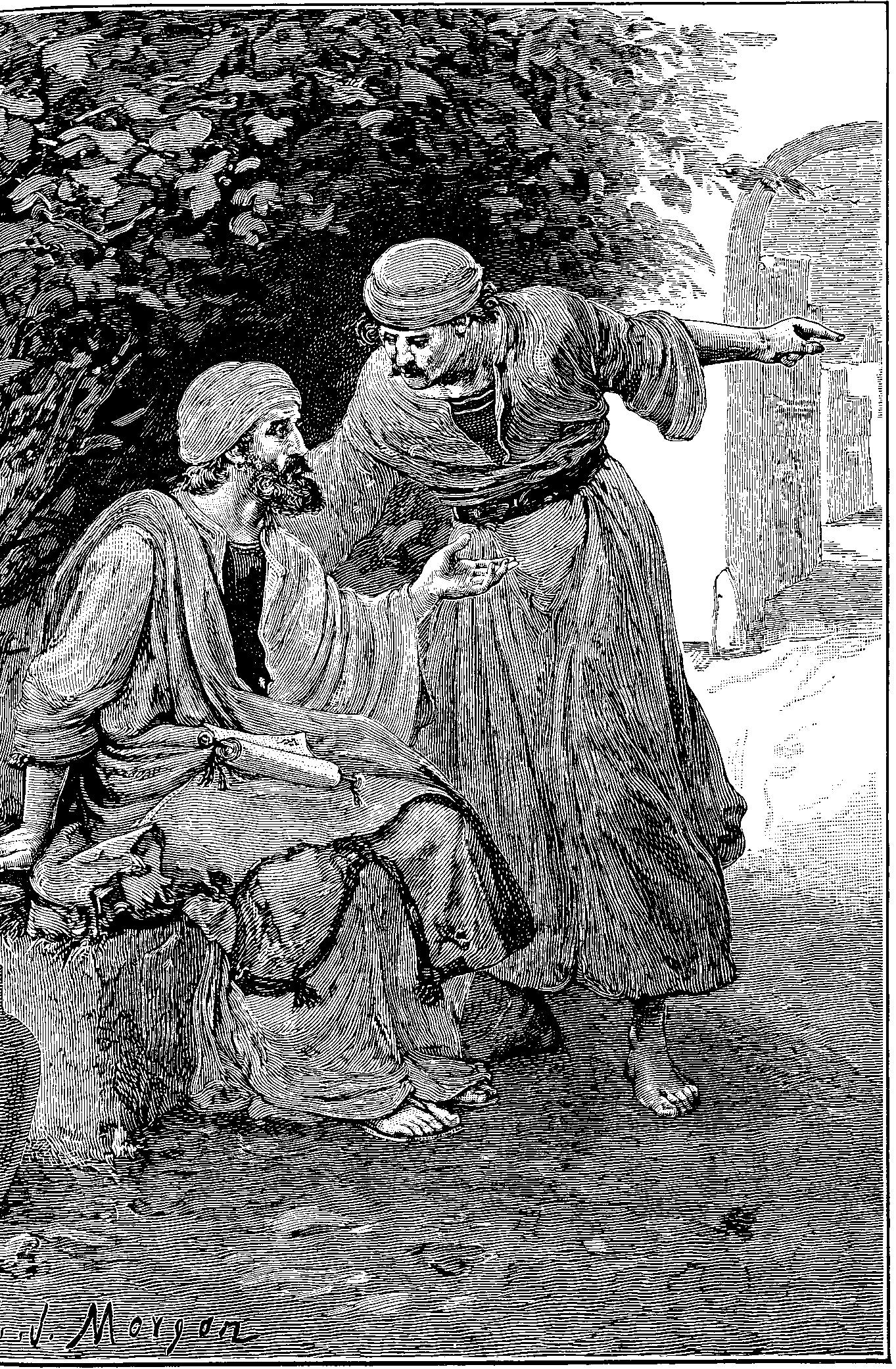
- "Philip and Nathanael", by W.J. Morgan (1910).
- Book: Gospel of John
- Christian Bible part: New Testament

John 1:45 is the 45th verse in the first chapter of the Gospel of John in the New Testament of the Christian Bible.

== Content ==
In the original Greek according to Westcott-Hort this verse is:

Εὑρίσκει Φίλιππος τὸν Ναθαναήλ, καὶ λέγει αὐτῷ, Ὃν ἔγραψε Μωσῆς ἐν τῷ νόμῳ καὶ οἱ προφῆται εὑρήκαμεν, Ἰησοῦν τὸν υἱὸν τοῦ Ἰωσὴφ.

In the King James Version of the Bible the text reads:

Philip findeth Nathanael, and saith unto him, We have found him, of whom Moses in the law, and the prophets, did write, Jesus of Nazareth, the son of Joseph.

The New International Version translates the passage as:

Philip found Nathanael and told him, "We have found the one Moses wrote about in the Law, and about whom the prophets also wrote--Jesus of Nazareth, the son of Joseph."

== Analysis ==
Philip seeks out Nathanael, and likely found him at Cana of Galilee, the native place of Nathanael (John 21:2). There are a variety of opinions on who exactly Nathanael is. However, according to Lapide most believe he is the Apostle Bartholomew. First, because the other gospels always join Philip and Bartholomew. Second because we nowhere read about Christ calling Bartholomew. Thirdly because the other gospels do not mention Nathanael only Bartholomew. However, St. Augustine disagrees on account of Nathanael being overly learned in the law, believing that Jesus would only choose fishermen. Nathanael in Hebrew means the gift of God.

== Commentary from the Church Fathers ==
Chrysostom: "Philip is not persuaded himself, but begins preaching to others: Philip findeth Nathanael, and saith unto him, We have found Him of whom Moses in the Law, and the Prophets, did write, Jesus of Nazareth, the Son of Joseph. See how zealous he is, and how constantly he is meditating on the books of Moses, and looking for Christ’s coming. That Christ was coming he had known before; but he did not know that this was the Christ, of whom Moses and the Prophets did write: He says this to give credibility to his preaching, and to show his zeal for the Law and the Prophets, and how that he had examined them attentively. Be not disturbed at his calling our Lord the Son of Joseph; this was what He was supposed to be."

Augustine: "The person to whom our Lord’s mother had been betrothed. The Christians know from the Gospel, that He was conceived and born of an undefiled mother. He adds the place too, of Nazareth."

Theophylact of Ohrid: " He was bred up there: the place of His birth could not have been known generally, but all knew that He was bred up in Nazareth."

Preceded by John 1:44	Gospel of John; Chapter 1	Succeeded by John 1:46
