= John 1:48 =

- ← 1:47 1:49 →
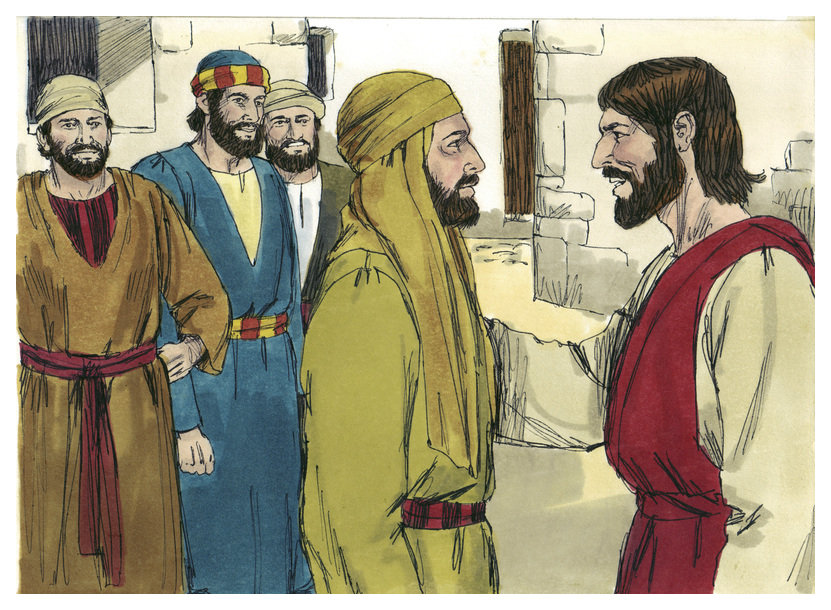
- "Jesus talked to Nathanael" (Bible Illustrations by Jim Padgett, Sweet Media, 1984).
- Book: Gospel of John
- Christian Bible part: New Testament

John 1:48 is a verse in the first chapter of the Gospel of John in the New Testament.

== Content ==
In the original Greek according to Westcott-Hort this verse is:

Λέγει αὐτῷ Ναθαναήλ, Πόθεν με γινώσκεις; Ἀπεκρίθη ὁ Ἰησοῦς καὶ εἶπεν αὐτῷ, Πρὸ τοῦ σε Φίλιππον φωνῆσαι, ὄντα ὑπὸ τὴν συκῆν, εἶδόν σε.

In the King James Version of the Bible the text reads:

Nathanael saith unto him, Whence knowest thou me? Jesus answered and said unto him, Before that Philip called thee, when thou wast under the fig tree, I saw thee.

The New International Version translates the passage as:

"How do you know me?" Nathanael asked. Jesus answered, "I saw you while you were still under the fig tree before Philip called you."

== Analysis ==
Lapide notes that Nathanael is not puffed up with Jesus' praise, but instead, he inquires so that he might learn something about Christ. Lapide believes that he is rewarded for this in that he learns about the "fearful" omnipresence of God and Christ who sees "into the inmost chamber" of all. The "under the fig tree" statement seems to refer to the story in Genesis where God saw Adam under a fig tree eating its forbidden fruit.

== Commentary from the Church Fathers ==
Theophylact of Ohrid: " Nathanael however, notwithstanding this praise, does not acquiesce immediately, but waits for further evidence, and asks, Whence knowest Thou me?"

Chrysostom: "He asks as man, Jesus answers as God: Jesus answered and said unto him, Before that Philip called thee, when thou wast under the fig tree, I saw thee: not having beheld him as man, but as God discerning him from above. I saw thee, He says, that is, the character of thy life, when thou wast under the fig tree: where the two, Philip and Nathanael, had been talking together alone, nobody seeing them; and on this account it is said, that on seeing him a long way off, He said, Behold an Israelite indeed; whence it appears that this speech was before Philip came near, so that no suspicion could attach to Christ’s testimony. Christ would not say, I am not of Nazareth, as Philip told you, but of Bethlehem; in order to avoid an argument: and because it would not have been sufficient proof, had He mentioned it, of His being the Christ. He preferred rather proving this by His having been present at their conversation."

Augustine: "Has this fig tree any meaning? We read of one fig tree which was cursed, because it had only leaves, and no fruit. Again, at the creation, Adam and Eve, after sinning, made themselves aprons of fig leaves. Fig leaves then signify sins; and Nathanael, when he was under the fig tree, was under the shadow of death: so that our Lord seemeth to say, O Israel, whoever of you is without guile, O people of the Jewish faith, before that I called thee by My Apostles, when thou wert as yet under the shadow of death, and sawest Me not, I saw thee."

Gregory the Great: "When thou wast under the fig tree, I saw thee; i. e. when thou wast yet under the shade of the law, I chose thee."

Preceded by John 1:47	Gospel of John; Chapter 1	Succeeded by John 1:49
