= John 1:47 =

- ← 1:46 1:48 →
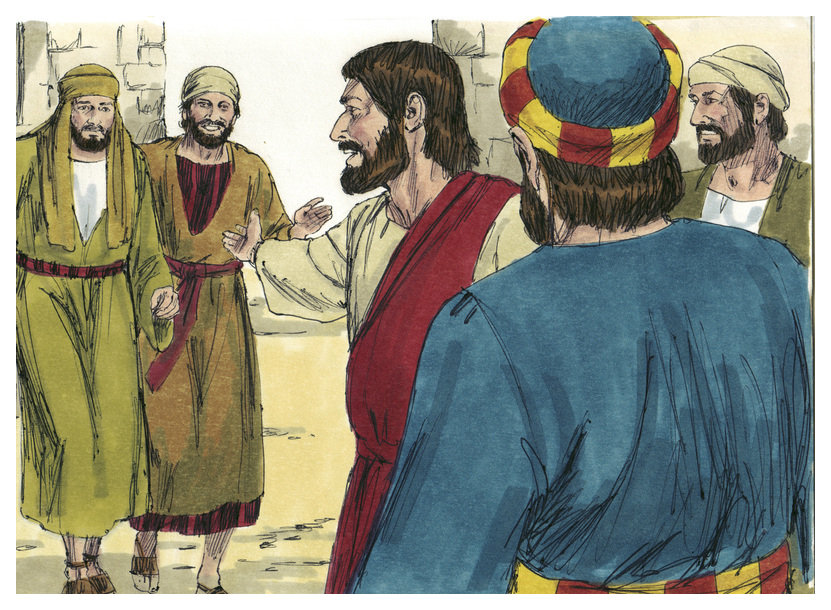
- "Philip took Nathanael to Jesus" (Bible Illustrations by Jim Padgett, Sweet Media, 1984).
- Book: Gospel of John
- Christian Bible part: New Testament

John 1:47 is the 47th verse in the first chapter of the Gospel of John in the New Testament of the Christian Bible.

== Content ==
In the original Greek according to Westcott-Hort this verse is:

Εἶδεν ὁ Ἰησοῦς τὸν Ναθαναὴλ ἐρχόμενον πρὸς αὐτόν, καὶ λέγει περὶ αὐτοῦ, Ἴδε ἀληθῶς Ἰσραηλίτης, ἐν ᾧ δόλος οὐκ ἔστι.

In the King James Version of the Bible the text reads:

Jesus saw Nathanael coming to him, and saith of him, Behold an Israelite indeed, in whom is no guile!

The New International Version translates the passage as:

When Jesus saw Nathanael approaching, he said of him, "Here is a true Israelite, in whom there is nothing false."

== Analysis ==
Cornelius a Lapide states that this passage clearly shows that Jesus knew the pure state of Nathanael's heart. And so by this sign, Nathanael could know that Jesus was not just a person, but also God, a "knower of hearts". John MacEvilly comments that Jesus knew that Nathanael would come to Him in simplicity and would not try to debate with Him from the scriptures.

== Commentary from the Church Fathers ==
Chrysostom: "Nathanael, in difficulty as to Christ coming out of Nazareth, showed the care with which he had read the Scriptures: his not rejecting the tidings when brought him, showed his strong desire for Christ’s coming. He thought that Philip might be mistaken as to the place. It follows, Jesus saw Nathanael coming to Him, and saith of him, Behold an Israelite indeed, in whom is no guile! There was no fault to be found with him, though he had spoken like one who did not believe, because he was more deeply read in the Prophets than Philip. He calls him guileless, because he had said nothing to gain favour, or gratify malice."

Augustine: "What does this mean, In whom is no guile? Had he no sin? Was no physician necessary for him? Far from it. No one was ever born, of a temper not to need the Physician. It is guile, when we say one thing, and think another. How then was there no guile in him? Because, if he was a sinner, he confessed his sin; whereas if a man, being a sinner, pretends to be righteous, there is guile in his mouth. Our Lord then commended the confession of sin in Nathanael; He did not pronounce him not a sinner."

Preceded by John 1:46	Gospel of John; Chapter 1	Succeeded by John 1:48
