= John 1:49 =

- ← 1:48 1:50 →
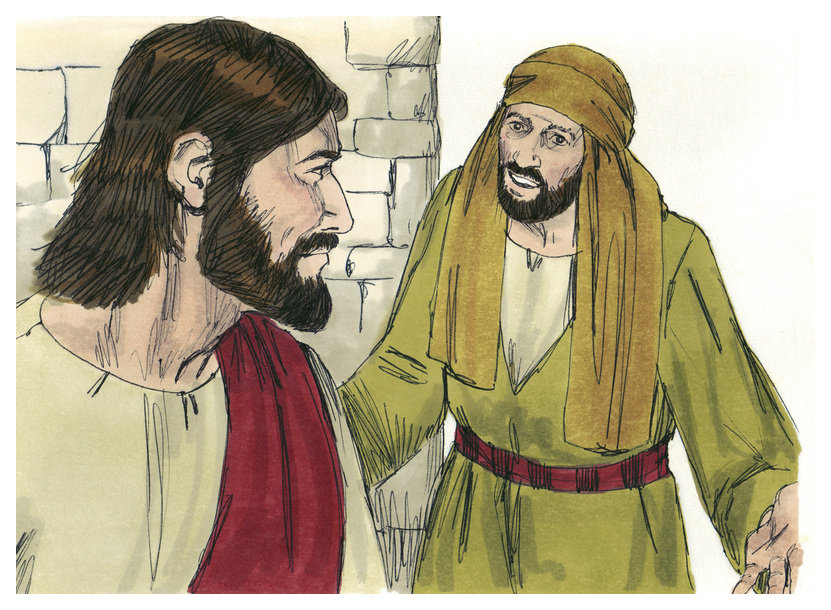
- "Nathanael acknowledged Jesus as the Son of God" (Bible Illustrations by Jim Padgett, Sweet Media, 1984).
- Book: Gospel of John
- Christian Bible part: New Testament

John 1:49 is a verse in the first chapter of the Gospel of John in the New Testament.

== Content ==
In the original Greek according to Westcott-Hort this verse is:

Ἀπεκρίθη Ναθαναὴλ καὶ λέγει αὐτῷ, Ῥαββί, σὺ εἶ ὁ υἱὸς τοῦ Θεοῦ, σὺ εἶ ὁ βασιλεὺς τοῦ Ἰσραήλ.

In the King James Version of the Bible the text reads:

Nathanael answered and saith unto him, Rabbi, thou art the Son of God; thou art the King of Israel.

The New International Version translates the passage as:

Then Nathanael declared, "Rabbi, you are the Son of God; you are the King of Israel."

== Analysis ==
There is much debate about how well Nathanael really understood what he was saying when he declared Christ to be "the Son of God," since he follows up his statement with a more limited title, "King of Israel," rather than, "King of the Nations." Still, he appears to be alluding to Psalm 2, "Yet have I set My King upon My holy hill of Zion. I will declare His precept: the Lord said to Me, You are My Son, today have I begotten You." It is believed that he may have been influenced in this remark by Philip who would have learned the nature of Christ from John the Baptist.

== Commentary from the Church Fathers ==
Augustine: "Nathanael remembered that he had been under the fig tree, where Christ was not present corporeally, but only by His spiritual knowledge. Hence, knowing that he had been alone, he recognised our Lord’s Divinity."

Chrysostom: "That our Lord then had this knowledge, had penetrated into his mind, had not blamed but praised his hesitation, proved to Nathanael that He was the true Christ: Nathanael answered and saith unto Him, Rabbi, Thou art the Son of God, Thou art the King of Israel: as if he said, Thou art He who was expected, thou art He who was sought for. Sure proof being obtained, he proceeds to make confession; herein showing his devotion, as his former hesitation had shown his diligence."

| Preceded by John 1:48 | Gospel of John; Chapter 1 | Succeeded by John 1:50 |
