= John 1:46 =

- ← 1:45 1:47 →
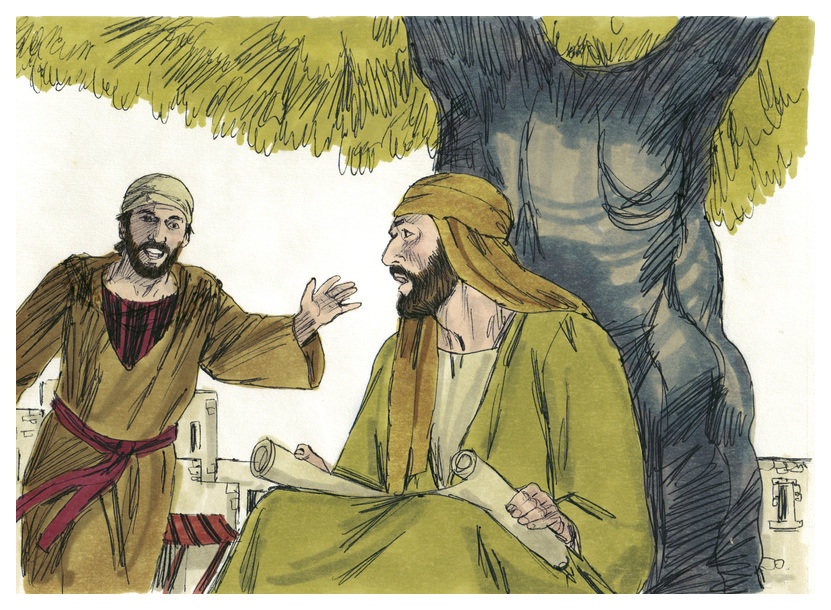
- "Philip told Nathanael about the Messiah" (Bible Illustrations by Jim Padgett, Sweet Media, 1984).
- Book: Gospel of John
- Christian Bible part: New Testament

John 1:46 is the 46th verse in the first chapter of the Gospel of John in the New Testament of the Christian Bible.

== Content ==
In the original Greek according to Westcott-Hort this verse is:

Καὶ εἶπεν αὐτῷ Ναθαναήλ, Ἐκ Ναζαρὲθ δύναταί τι ἀγαθὸν εἶναι; Λέγει αὐτῷ Φίλιππος, Ἔρχου καὶ ἴδε.

In the King James Version of the Bible the text reads:

And Nathanael said unto him, Can there any good thing come out of Nazareth? Philip saith unto him, Come and see.

The New International Version translates the passage as:

"Nazareth! Can anything good come from there?" Nathanael asked. "Come and see," said Philip.

== Analysis ==
Micah (chapter 5) had foretold that Christ was to be from Judah and of David, and that he was to be born in Bethlehem. However, neither seems to have known that Christ was conceived in Nazareth and born in Bethlehem. A similar reply comes from the Scribes in their reply to Herod (Matthew 2:5) and the Jews who reply to Nicodemus (John 7:52), saying that no Prophet could come out of Nazareth. MacEvilly believes that Nathanael does not seem to deny it but rather simply wonders at the statement. From Philip's words, it appears he has no doubt that a short encounter with Christ will convince Nathanael.

== Commentary from the Church Fathers ==
Augustine: "However you may understand these words, Philip's answer will suit. You may read it either as affirmatory, Something good can come out of Nazareth; to which the other says, Come and see: or you may read it as a question, implying doubt on Nathanael's part, Can any good thing come out of Nazareth? Come and see. Since either way of reading agrees equally with what follows, we must inquire the meaning of the passage. Nathanael was well-read in the Law, and therefore the word Nazareth (Philip having said that he had found Jesus of Nazareth) immediately raises his hopes, and he exclaims, Something good can come out of Nazareth. He had searched the Scriptures, and knew, what the Scribes and Pharisees could not, that the Saviour was to be expected thence."

Alcuin: "He who alone is absolutely holy, harmless, undefiled; of whom the prophet saith, There shall come forth a rod out of the stem of Jesse, and a branch (Nazaræus) shall grow out of his roots (Isaiah 11:1). Or the words may be taken as expressing doubt, and asking the question."

Chrysostom: "Nathanael knew from the Scriptures, that Christ was to come from Bethlehem, according to the prophecy of Micah, And thou, Bethlehem, in the land of Judah,—out of thee shall come a Governor, that shall rule my people Israel (Micah 5:2). On hearing of Nazareth, then, he doubted, and was not able to reconcile Philip's tidings with prophecy. For the Prophets call Him a Nazarene, only in reference to His education and mode of life. Observe, however, the discretion and gentleness with which he communicates his doubts. He does not say, Thou deceivest me, Philip; but simply asks the question, Can any good thing come out of Nazareth? Philip too in turn is equally discrete. He is not confounded by the question, but dwells upon it, and lingers in the hope of bringing him to Christ: Philip saith unto him, Come and see. He takes him to Christ, knowing that when he had once tasted of His words and doctrine, he will make no more resistance."

Preceded by John 1:45	Gospel of John; Chapter 1	Succeeded by John 1:47
