= Authorship of the Johannine works =

The authorship of the Johannine works (the Gospel of John, the Johannine epistles, and the Book of Revelation) has been debated by biblical scholars since at least the 2nd century AD. The debate focuses mainly on the identity of the author(s), as well as the date and location of authorship of these writings.

Although the tradition and many modern scholars attribute these works to John the Apostle, a plurality identify John the Elder as author or Lazarus. Although most view the Beloved Disciple as the witness behind the gospel, a growing number of scholars view the disciple as a literary creation instead. A growing number of scholars have challenged the idea of a Johannine community, with recent scholarship tending to ascribe a single author for the gospel. Although some scholars conclude the author of the epistles was different from that of the gospel, most scholars agree that all three epistles are expressed by the same author or school of thought.

John's Gospel was likely written in Ephesus, c. 90–100 AD. In the case of Revelation, many modern scholars theorize that it was composed by a separate author, John of Patmos, c. 95, with some parts possibly dating to Nero's reign in the early 60s.

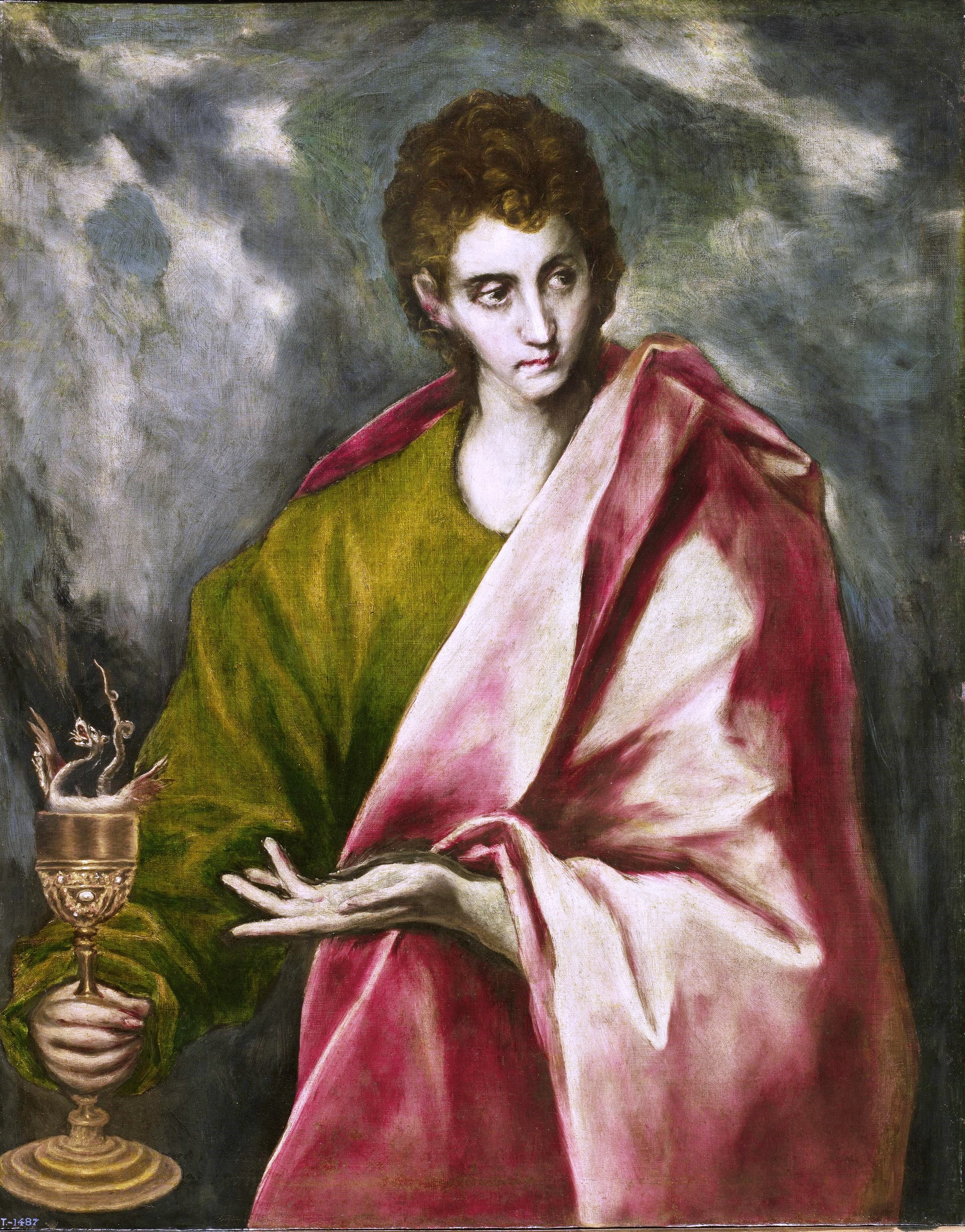
El Greco's c. 1605 painting Saint John the Evangelist shows the traditional author of the Johannine works as a young man.

== Early use and attribution of the Johannine works ==
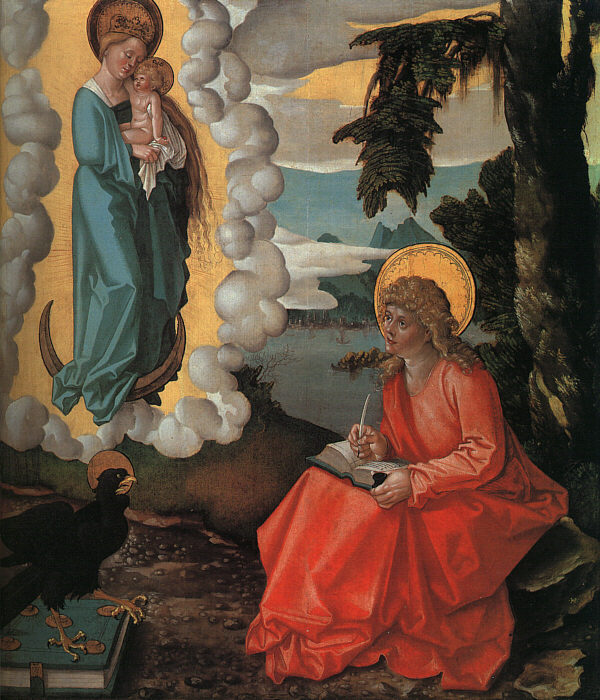
Saint John on Patmos by Hans Baldung Grien, 1511.

=== Attestation ===
The first supposed witness to Johannine theology among the Fathers of the Church is in Ignatius of Antioch, whose Letter to the Philippians some claim references John 3:8 and alludes to John 10:7-9 and John 14:6, but none of these are direct quotations or contain information exclusive to John. Polycarp of Smyrna quotes about the "antichrist" in his Epistle to the Phillipians 7:1, a sure reference from the letters of John because the antichrist doctrine is not found in the textual record before the Johannine letters. Justin Martyr also alludes to ideas in John, though this reference is not certain, so the dating of John is not settled.

The earliest testimony to the author was that of Papias, preserved in fragmentary quotes in Eusebius's history of the Church. Papias quoted the First Epistle of John and may have also known the Gospel of John and compared it to Mark. Eusebius says that two different Johns must be distinguished, John the Apostle, and John the Presbyter, with the Gospel assigned to the Apostle and the Book of Revelation to the Presbyter.

Irenaeus's witness based on Papias represents the tradition in Ephesus, where John the Apostle is reputed to have lived. Irenaeus was a disciple of Polycarp, thus in the second generation after the apostle. According to many scholars, he states unequivocally that the apostle is the author of the Gospel. (Other scholars note, however, that Irenaeus consistently refers to the author of the gospel, as well as of Revelation, as "the disciple of the Lord", whereas he refers to the others as "apostles". And so Irenaeus appears to distinguish John, the author of the fourth gospel, from John the Apostle.) Koester rejects the reference of Ignatius of Antioch as referring to the Gospel and cites Irenaeus as the first to use it.

For some time it was common practice to assert that the Rylands Library Papyrus P52, which contains a small portion of chapter 18 of the Gospel of John, demonstrated that the text of the gospel spread rapidly through Egypt in the second century. However, more recent scholarship has shown the fragment may date from as late as the third or fourth century, rather than the second century, as was previously supposed.

Clement of Alexandria mentions John the Apostle's missionary activity in Asia Minor, and continues, "As for John, the last, upon seeing that in the Gospels they had told the corporal matters, supported by his disciples and inspired by the Holy Spirit, he wrote a spiritual Gospel." Origen, when asked how John had placed the cleansing of the Temple first rather than last, responded, "John does not always tell the truth literally, he always tells the truth spiritually." In Alexandria, the authorship of the Gospel and the first epistle were never questioned. Bruce Metzger stated "One finds in Clement's work citations of all the books of the New Testament with the exception of Philemon, James, 2 Peter, and 2 and 3 John."

=== Quotations ===
The gospel was not widely quoted until late in the 2nd century. Justin Martyr is probably the first Church Father to quote the Gospel of John. Some scholars conclude that in antiquity John was probably considered less important than the synoptics. Walter Bauer suggests:

Can it be a coincidence that immediately after Justin, the enemy of heretics who took aim at the Valentinians (Dial. 35. 6), we note the appearance in Italy-Rome of two representatives of this latter school who especially treasure the Fourth Gospel – namely Ptolemy and Heracleon (Hillolytus Ref. 6. 35)? To be sure, Justin's disciple Tatian placed the Gospel of John on the same level as the synoptics, but he also broke with the church on account of profound differences in faith – poisoned, so Irenaeus thought, by the Valentinians and Marcion (AH 1. 28. 1 [=1.26.1]).

One reason for this 'orthodox ambivalence' was gnostic acceptance of the fourth gospel. The early Gnostic use is referred to by Irenaeus, Hippolytus and Origen in quoted commentary made on John by the Gnostics Ptolemy, Basilides and Heracleon. In the quote below Irenaeus argues against the gnostic heresy from his book Against Heresies:

For, summing up his statements respecting the Word previously mentioned by him, he further declares, "And the Word was made flesh, and dwelt among us." But, according to their [gnostic] hypothesis, the Word did not become flesh at all, inasmuch as He never went outside of the Pleroma, but that Saviour [became flesh] who was formed by a special dispensation [out of all the Æons], and was of later date than the Word.

Several church fathers of the 2nd century never quoted John, but the earliest extant written commentary on any book of the New Testament was that written on John by Heracleon, a disciple of the gnostic Valentinus.

The following table shows the number of times various church fathers cited John compared to the synoptic gospels.

Gospel	Barn.	Did.	Ign.	Poly.	Herm.	II Clem.	Papias	Basilides
Synoptics	1?	1?	7(+4?)	1	0	1(+3?)	2	1
John or Epistles	0	0	2?	1	0	0	?	1

Gospel	Marcion	Justin	Valentinus	Hegesip.	Ptolem.	Melito	Apollin.	Athenag.
Synoptics	Luke	170	1	3?	4	4	1	13
John or Epistles	0	1	0	0	1	4	1	0

== Gospel of John ==
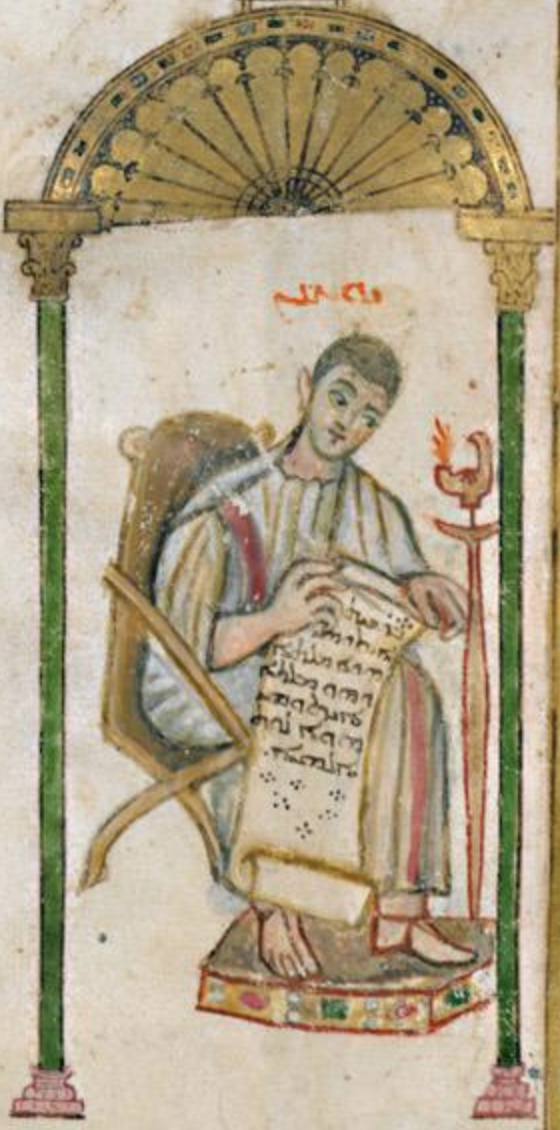
A Syriac Christian rendition of St. John the Evangelist, from the Rabbula Gospels, 6th century.

=== Dating ===
The Gospel of John is considered to be the last of the four canonical Gospels to be written. Most modern scholars date it to between 90 and 100 AD, although a minority suggest an even later date. Both early Christian traditions and the majority of scholars place its composition in Ephesus. (Note: The Fourth Gospel may also have been written later as it was penned for a smaller group within the Johannine community, and was not circulated widely until a later date.) However, claims of authorship that date much later than 100 AD have been called into question due to the Rylands Library Papyrus P52, a fragment of the gospel found in Egypt that was probably written around 125 AD.

=== Authorship ===
==== 19th century views ====
According to Adolf Jülicher, K.G. Bretschneider's 1820s work on the topic of Johannine authorship pioneered the modern critical scholarship on this topic. Bretschneider called into question the apostolic authorship of the Gospel, and even stated that, on the basis of the author's unsteady grip of topography, the author could not have come from Palestine. He argued that the meaning and nature of Jesus presented in the Gospel of John was very different from that in the Synoptic Gospels, and thus its author could not have been an eyewitness to the events. Bretschneider cited an apologetic character in John, indicating a later date of composition. Surprisingly, he still later asserted its authenticity.

Scholars such as Wellhausen, Wendt, and Spitta have argued that the fourth gospel is a Grundschrift or a, "..work which had suffered interpolation before arriving at its canonical form; it was a unity as it stood."

Walter Bauer opened the modern discussion on John with his book Rechtgläubigkeit und Ketzerei im ältesten Christentum (English: Orthodoxy and Heresy in Earliest Christianity). Bauer's thesis is that "the heretics probably outnumbered the orthodox" in the early Christian world and that heresy and orthodoxy were not as narrowly defined as we now define them. He was "convinced that none of the Apostolic Fathers had relied on the authority of the Fourth Gospel. It was the gnostics, the Marcionites, and the Montanists who first used it and introduced it to the Christian community."

==== John the Apostle ====
Christian tradition and many modern scholars attributes the authorship of the gospel to the apostle John, son of Zebedee. (Note: Leon Morris (1995): "Continental scholars have ... abandoned the idea that this gospel was written by the apostle John, whereas in Great Britain and America scholarship has been much more open to the idea." Abandonment is due to changing opinion rather "than to any new evidence [...] Werner, Colson, and I have been joined, among others, by I. Howard Marshall and J.A.T. Robinson in seeing the evidence as pointing to John the son of Zebedee as the author of this Gospel." See also: F. F. Bruce (1981): "The evidence [...] favor[s] the apostolicity of the gospel [...] John knew the other gospels and ... supplements them [...] The synoptic narrative becomes more intelligible if we follow John." John's style is different so Jesus' "abiding truth might be presented to men and women who were quite unfamiliar with the original setting [...] He does not yield to any temptation to restate Christianity [...] It is the story of events that happened in history [...] John does not divorce the story from its Palestinian context."; Edwards, R. A. "The Gospel According to St. John" 1954, p 9. One reason he accepts John's authorship is because "the alternative solutions seem far too complicated to be possible in a world where living men met and talked".; Hunter, A. M. "Interpreting the New Testament" P 86. "After all the conjectures have been heard, the likeliest view is that which identifies the Beloved Disciple with the Apostle John.; Dr. Craig Blomberg, cited in Lee Strobel The Case for Christ, 1998, Chapter 2.; Marshall, Howard. "The Illustrated Bible Dictionary", ed J. D. Douglas et al. Leicester 1980. II, p 804; Robinson, J. A. T. "The Priority of John" P 122) Continental scholarship has moved away from this identification, and a plurality of scholars identify John the Elder as author, while a growing number of scholars view the beloved disciple as a literary creation. The Synoptic Gospels are united in identifying John as a fisherman from Galilee, and Acts 4:13 refers to John as "without learning" or "unlettered". The Fourth Gospel is written by someone who, based on their style and knowledge of the Greek language and grammar, would have to have been well-educated in Greek; on the other hand, as an uneducated illiterate Galilean fisherman, John the Apostle would most likely have had Aramaic as his native language, and no knowledge of any other language, let alone the ability to write in the sophisticated Greek of the Fourth Gospel. The Fourth Gospel emphasises Judea, and the author seems to have had advanced knowledge of Judean topography, so likely came from there; on the other hand, John the Apostle came from Galilee.

The question remains why the Fourth Gospel was eventually given the title 'the Gospel of John', especially because John, son of Zebedee is never mentioned in the Fourth Gospel. (Note: The name "John" occurs 23 times the Fourth Gospel, but in none of these cases the name refers to a disciple of Jesus. 19 of the mentions refer to John the Baptist (verses 1:6, 1:15, 1:19, 1:26, 1:28, 1:32, 1:35, 1:40, 3:23, 3:24, 3:25, 3:26, 3:27, 4:1, 5:33, 5:35, 5:36, 10:40, and 10:41); the 4 remaining instances refer to the father of Simon Peter (verses 1:42, 21:15, 21:16, and 21:17). Verse 21:2 does mention 'the sons of Zebedee' in passing amongst a group of 7 disciples, without mentioning how many sons there were, or what their personal names were.) This may be the result of connecting the Beloved Disciple, who is presented in the fourth gospel as one of Jesus’s closest followers and its eyewitness narrator, with Jesus’ closest disciples in the Synoptics, Peter, James, and John. Although most view the Beloved Disciple as the witness behind the gospel, an increasing number of scholars view the disciple as a literary creation by the author of the Fourth Gospel rather than a historical figure instead. with none of the proposed candidates being plausible and the real author remaining unknown and unnamed. In addition, mainstream scholars conclude that the author of the Book of Revelation did not write the Gospel of John due to a wide range of differences in eschatology, language, and tone between the two texts.

==== The beloved disciple ====
The phrase the disciple whom Jesus loved (Greek: ὁ μαθητὴς ὃν ἠγάπα ὁ Ἰησοῦς, ho mathētēs hon ēgapā ho Iēsous) or, in John 20:2, the disciple beloved of Jesus (Greek: ὃν ἐφίλει ὁ Ἰησοῦς, hon ephilei ho Iēsous) is an unnamed person mentioned six times in the Gospel of John, but in no other New Testament accounts of Jesus. The majority of scholars believe the verses (1:14, 19:35, 21:24) claim the beloved disciple was the author of the gospel, though some view the author as claiming to be recording the disciple's testimony. Some theologians and scholars have, by way of elimination, identified this disciple as one of the Twelve Disciples of Jesus, usually John, son of Zebedee, though other scholars question the attribution to John the Apostle.

Author Hugh J. Schonfield, in the controversial The Passover Plot (1965) and other works, claimed that the source of this Gospel was the Beloved Disciple of the Last Supper and further that this person, perhaps named John, was a senior Temple priest and so probably a member of the Sanhedrin. This would account for the knowledge of and access to the Temple which would not have been available to rough fishermen and followers of a disruptive rural preacher from Galilee, one who was being accused of heresy besides, and probably for the evanescent presence of the Beloved Disciple in the events of Jesus' Ministry. On this reading, the Gospel was perhaps written by a student and follower of this disciple in his last years, perhaps at Patmos.

===== Identification with John the Evangelist =====
Possibly since the end of the first century, the Beloved Disciple has been commonly identified with John the Evangelist. In his early-4th-century Ecclesiastical History, Eusebius wrote 'the apostle and evangelist John, the one whom Jesus loved...'. Objections are raised against the identification of John the Apostle with the "disciple whom Jesus loved", because the latter is not mentioned before the Last Supper. The title ("beloved disciple") is also strange to Baptist scholar George Beasley-Murray because "if the beloved disciple were one of the Twelve, he would have been sufficiently known outside the Johannine circle of churches for the author to have named him".

===== Identifications with others =====
Parker suggested that this disciple might be John Mark; nonetheless, the Acts of the Apostles indicate that John Mark was very young and a late-comer as a disciple. J. Colson suggested that "John" was a priest in Jerusalem, explaining the alleged priestly mentality in the fourth gospel. R. Schnackenburg suggested that "John" was an otherwise unknown resident of Jerusalem who was in Jesus' circle of friends. According to Esther de Boer, the Gospel of Philip and the Gospel of Mary identify Mary Magdalene as the disciple whom Jesus loved; this was made notorious in the fictional The Da Vinci Code. A group of Christians, referred to as Alogi by Epiphanius, credited Cerinthus with writing the Gospel of John and rejected this Gospel, while also accepting the Synoptic Gospels and maintaining a more-or-less standard Christology and Orthodox form of worship. According to Dionysius bar Salibi citing a lost work by Hippolytus of Rome, the Alogi were led by a man named Caius. The name Alogi was applied to them by their enemies, and what little is known about them comes from those who considered them heretics. The name Alogi is a play on words, meaning illogical in Biblical Greek and referring both to their beliefs as being illogical and a rejection of the Logos of John's Gospel.

Filson, Sanders, Vernard Eller, Rudolf Steiner, and Ben Witherington suggest Lazarus, since John 11:3 and 11:36 specifically indicates that Jesus "loved" him.

=== Johannine community ===
The Gospel of John provides a marked impression of unity and coherence, and while some twentieth century scholars such as Raymond Brown suggested the gospel developed from a hypothetical school or "Johannine community" – a number of different authors who wrote the Fourth Gospel together, contemporary scholarship has mostly moved away from this theory for single authorship. this view is currently in retreat, and most recent scholars treat the text as largely the work of a single author. Recent scholarship has turned against positing hypothetical editions or sources behind John's gospel.

More recently, a growing number of scholars including Adele Reinhartz and Robert Kysar have challenged the idea of a Johannine community and cite the lack of evidence for such a community. Richard Bauckham argued that the gospels as Greco-Roman biographies assumed a wide audience rather than individual communities, and Edward Klink questioned a two-level readings of the gospel and the Johannine community. Hugo Mendez contends that the pseudepigraphal nature of the Gospel and epistles’ claim to eyewitness authorship renders them unreliable sources for historical reconstruction or the Johannine community.

Gnostic origins

Criticism in the early 20th century centered on the idea of the Logos (word), which was perceived as a Hellenistic concept. Thus H. J. Holtzmann hypothesized a dependence of the work on Philo Judaeus; Albert Schweitzer considered the work to be a Hellenized version of Pauline mysticism, while R. Reitzenstein sought the work's origin in Egyptian and Persian mystery religions.

Rudolf Bultmann took a different approach to the work. He hypothesized a Gnostic origin (specifically Mandaeanism which maintains that Jesus was a mšiha kdaba or "false prophet,") for the work. He noted similarities with the Pauline corpus, but attributed this to a common Hellenistic background. He claimed that the many contrasts in the Gospel, between light and darkness, truth and lies, above and below, and so on, show a tendency toward dualism, explained by the Gnostic roots of the work. Despite the Gnostic origin, Bultmann commended the author for several improvements over Gnosticism, such as the Judeo-Christian view of creation and the demythologizing of the role of the Redeemer. He saw the Gospel as an investigation into a God who was wholly Other and transcendent, seeing no place in the vision of the author for a Church or sacraments.

Bultmann's analysis is still widely applied in German-speaking countries, although with many corrections and discussions. Wide-ranging replies have been made to this analysis. Today, most Christian exegetes reject much of Bultmann's theory, but accept certain of his intuitions. For instance, J. Blank uses Bultmann in his discussion of the Last Judgment and W. Thüsing uses him to discuss the elevation and glorification of Jesus. In the English-speaking world, Bultmann has had less impact. Instead, these scholars tended to continue in the investigation of the Hellenistic and Platonistic theories, generally returning to theories closer to the traditional interpretation. By way of example, G.H.C. McGregor (1928) and W.F. Howard (1943) belong to this group.

The discovery of the Dead Sea Scrolls in Qumran (1946/47–1956) marked a change in Johannine scholarship.

The resulting revolution in Johannine scholarship was termed the new look by John A. T. Robinson, who coined the phrase in 1957 at Oxford. According to Robinson, this new information rendered the question of authorship a relative one. He considered a group of disciples around the aging John the Apostle who wrote down his memories, mixing them with theological speculation, a model that had been proposed as far back as Renan's Vie de Jésus ("Life of Jesus," 1863).

Gnosticism scholar Elaine Pagels claimed in 2003 that the author of the Fourth Gospel was a Gnostic, citing similarities with the Gospel of Thomas and the Gospel of Philip. According to Gnosticism scholar Pagels, "Qumran fever" that was raised by the discovery of the Scrolls was gradually dying down, with theories of Gnostic influences in the Johannine works beginning to be proposed again, especially in Germany. Some recent views have seen the theology of Johannine works as directly opposing "Thomas Christians". Most scholars, however, consider the Gnosticism question closed.

== Epistles of John ==
Most scholars agree that all three letters are written by the same author, although there is debate on who that author is. These three epistles are similar in terminology, style, and general situation. They are loosely associated with the Gospel of John and may result from that gospel's theology. Internal evidence as well as commentary by Papias and Polycarp suggest that the Johannine epistles originated in Asia Minor. Early references to the epistles, the organization of the church apparent in the text, and the lack of reference to persecution suggests that they were written early in the 2nd century.

=== First epistle ===
The phraseology of the first letter of John is very similar to that of the fourth gospel, so the question of its authorship is often connected to the question of authorship of the gospel. The two works use many of the same characteristic words and phrases, such as light, darkness, life, truth, a new commandment, to be of the truth, to do the truth and only begotten son. In both works, the same basic concepts are explored: the Word, the incarnation, the passing from death to life, the truth and lies, etc. The two works also bear many stylistic affinities to one another. In the words of Amos Wilder, the works share "a combination of simplicity and elevation which differs from the flexible discourse of Paul and from the more concrete vocabulary and formal features of the Synoptic Gospels."

Given the similarity with the Gospel, the "great majority" (as of 1957) of critical scholars assign the same authorship to the epistle that they assign to the Gospel. At the end of the 19th century, scholar Ernest DeWitt Burton was able to write that, "the similarity in style, vocabulary and doctrine to the fourth gospel is, however, so clearly marked that there can be no reasonable doubt that the letter and the gospel are from the same pen." Starting with Heinrich Julius Holtzmann, however, and continuing with C. H. Dodd, some scholars have maintained that the epistle and the gospel were written by different authors. There are at least two principal arguments for this view. The first is that the epistle often uses a demonstrative pronoun at the beginning of a sentence, then a particle or conjunction, followed by an explanation or definition of the demonstrative at the end of the sentence, a stylistic technique which is not used in the gospel. The second is that the author of the epistle, "uses the conditional sentence in a variety of rhetorical figures which are unknown to the gospel."

The book was not among those whose canonicity was in doubt, according to Eusebius; however, it is not included in an ancient Syrian canon. Theodore of Mopsuestia also presented a negative opinion toward its canonicity. Outside of the Syrian world, however, the book has many early witnesses, and appears to have been widely accepted.

The First Epistle of John assumes knowledge of the Gospel of John, and some scholars think that the epistle's author might have been the one who redacted the gospel.

=== Second and third epistles ===
Irenaeus, in the late second-century, quotes from 1st and 2nd John, and states that he is quoting the Apostle John. Eusebius claimed that the author of 2nd and 3rd John was not John the Apostle but actually John the Elder, due to the introductions of the epistles. However, modern scholars have argued that Eusebius made this conclusion based on a misinterpretation of a statement from Papias and a desire to invent a second John to be the author of Revelation. Carson suggests that the vocabulary, structure, and grammar of the Gospel of John is remarkably similar to 1st John, 2nd John and 3rd John.

== Book of Revelation ==
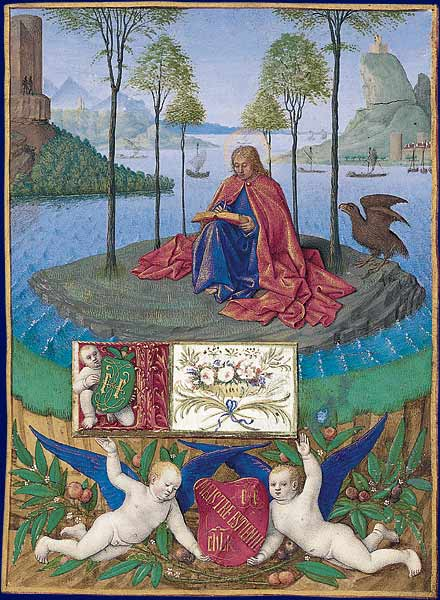
Saint John of Patmos, by Jean Fouquet

The author of the Book of Revelation identifies himself as "John". The book has been traditionally credited to John the Apostle. Reference to the apostle's authorship is found as early as Justin Martyr, in his Dialogue with Trypho. Other early witnesses to this tradition are Papias, Irenaeus, Clement of Alexandria, Tertullian, Cyprian, and Hippolytus. This identification, however, was denied by other Fathers, including Dionysius of Alexandria, Eusebius of Caesarea, Cyril of Jerusalem, Gregory Nazianzen, and John Chrysostom. The Apocryphon of John, a Gnostic work, claims John as both the author of itself and Revelation.

A work of Epiphanius of Salamis records a Presbyter of Rome named Gaius who fiercely condemns Cerinthus, a Gnostic, and accuses Cerinthus of "lyingly introducing portents to us, supposedly shown him by angels, saying that after the resurrection the kingdom of Christ will be on earth and that again the flesh dwelling in Jerusalem will be the subject of desires and pleasures. And being an enemy of the Scriptures of God and wishing to deceive, he says the period of the marriage feast will be a thousand years." This is considered to probably be a reference to Revelation and an accusation that Cerinthus was its true author.

In the 3rd century, Bishop Dionysius of Alexandria rejected apostolic authorship but accepted the book's canonicity. Dionysius believed that the author was another man also named John, John the Presbyter, teacher of Papias, bishop of Hieropolis. Eusebius of Caesarea later agreed with this. Eusebius records Dionysius of reporting that in his day, those who disagreed with the authority of the book cited the argument that Cerinthus was the true author. It goes into more detail, saying that in this view, Cerinthus was a libertine who was a "lover of the body and quite carnal", and he wrote the book as wish fulfillment wherein the saints would enjoy similar fleshly pleasures in the future. Because apostolic authorship was one of several considerations for canonization, several Church Fathers and the Council of Laodicea rejected Revelation.

Mainstream scholars conclude that the author did not also write the Gospel of John because of wide differences in eschatology, language, and tone. The Book of Revelation contains grammatical errors and stylistic abnormalities whereas the Gospel and Epistles are all stylistically consistent which indicate its author may not have been as familiar with the Greek language as the Gospel/Epistles's author. Contemporary scholars note that when Revelation and the Gospel refer to Jesus as "lamb" they use different Greek words, and they spell "Jerusalem" differently. There are differing motifs between the book and the Gospel: use of allegory, symbolism, and similar metaphors, such as "living water", "shepherd", "lamb", and "manna". The Book of Revelation does not go into several typically Johannine themes, such as light, darkness, truth, love, and "the world" in a negative sense. The eschatology of the two works are also very different. Still, the author uses the terms "Word of God" and "Lamb of God" for Jesus Christ, possibly indicating that the author had a common theological background with the author of John.

Another issue arguing against authorship by John the Apostle is that "the apostles" are occasionally mentioned within the work, yet the author never indicates that he is one. Revelation 4 describes a vision of twenty-four elders seated on twenty-four thrones, which is generally assumed to be a reference to Jesus's promise that the twelve disciples would be seated on thrones and judge the Twelve Tribes of Israel (Matthew 19:28; Luke 22:28–30). Yet, if the identification of the twenty-four elders as the disciples and the Patriarchs of the twelve tribes is accurate, the author does not mention seeing himself among the elders.

== See also ==
- Authorship of the Pauline epistles
- John 21
- John the Evangelist
- Textual criticism

== Sources ==
- Koester, Craig R. (2015). Revelation: A New Translation with Introduction and Commentary. The Anchor Yale Bible Commentaries. Vol. 38A. New Haven and London: Yale University Press. ISBN 9780300216912.
- Lindars, Barnabas; Edwards, Ruth; Court, John M. (2000). The Johannine Literature. A&C Black. ISBN 978-1-84127-081-4.

== Bibliography ==
- Attridge, Harold W. (2008). "Part II: The Jesus Movements – Johannine Christianity". In Mitchell, Margaret M.; Young, Frances M. (eds.). The Cambridge History of Christianity, Volume 1: Origins to Constantine. Cambridge: Cambridge University Press. pp. 125–143. doi:10.1017/CHOL9780521812399.008. ISBN 9781139054836.
- Black, C. Clifton; Smith, D. Moody; Spivey, Robert A., eds. (2019) [1969]. "John: The Gospel of Jesus' Glory". Anatomy of the New Testament (8th ed.). Minneapolis: Fortress Press. pp. 129–156. doi:10.2307/j.ctvcb5b9q.15. ISBN 978-1-5064-5711-6. OCLC 1082543536. S2CID 242455133.
- de Boer, Martinus C. (2018). "The Story of the Johannine Community and its Literature". In de Boer, Martinus C.; Lieu, Judith M. (eds.). The Oxford Handbook of Johannine Studies. Oxford and New York: Oxford University Press. doi:10.1093/oxfordhb/9780198739982.013.4. ISBN 9780198739982. LCCN 2018947872. S2CID 189193694.
- Byers, Andrew J. (2017). "The Johannine Vision of Community: Trends, Approaches, and 'Narrative Ecclesiology'". Ecclesiology and Theosis in the Gospel of John. Cambridge: Cambridge University Press. pp. 3–24. doi:10.1017/9781316823750.002. ISBN 9781316823750.
- Doole, J. Andrew (March 2021). "To Be 'An Out-of-the-Synagoguer'". Journal for the Study of the New Testament. 43 (3). SAGE Publications: 389–410. doi:10.1177/0142064X20973905. ISSN 1745-5294. S2CID 228846103.
- Ferreira, Johan (1998). Johannine Ecclesiology. The Library of New Testament Studies. Sheffield: Sheffield Academic Press. ISBN 9780567286833. LCCN 98156774.
- Hill, Charles E. (2005). "Part III: The Evidence for a Johannine Corpus". The Johannine Corpus in the Early Church. Oxford and New York: Oxford University Press. pp. 447–464. doi:10.1093/0199264589.003.0009. ISBN 9780199264582. OCLC 475098055.
- Lincoln, Andrew T. (2018). "The Johannine Vision of the Church". In Avis, Paul (ed.). The Oxford Handbook of Ecclesiology. Oxford and New York: Oxford University Press. pp. 98–118. doi:10.1093/oxfordhb/9780199645831.013.23. ISBN 9780199645831.
- Méndez, Hugo (March 2020). "Did the Johannine Community Exist?". Journal for the Study of the New Testament. 42 (3). SAGE Publications: 350–374. doi:10.1177/0142064X19890490. ISSN 1745-5294. S2CID 216330794.
- Ong, Hughson T. (2015). "The Gospel from a Specific Community but for All Christians: Understanding the Johannine Community as a "Community of Practice"". In Porter, Stanley E.; Ong, Hughson T. (eds.). The Origins of John's Gospel. Johannine Studies. Vol. 2. Leiden and Boston: Brill Publishers. pp. 101–123. doi:10.1163/9789004303164_007. ISBN 978-90-04-30316-4. ISSN 2214-2800.
- Painter, John (2010). "Johannine Literature: The Gospel and Letters of John". In Aune, David E. (ed.). The Blackwell Companion to the New Testament. Chichester, West Sussex: Wiley-Blackwell. pp. 344–372. doi:10.1002/9781444318937.ch20. ISBN 9781444318937.
- Reinhartz, Adele (2013). "Forging a New Identity: Johannine Rhetoric and the Audience of the Fourth Gospel". In Krans, Jan; Lietaert Peerbolte, L. J.; Smit, Peter-Ben; Zwiep, Arie W. (eds.). Paul, John, and Apocalyptic Eschatology: Studies in Honour of Martinus C. de Boer. Novum Testamentum: Supplements. Vol. 149. Leiden: Brill Publishers. pp. 123–134. doi:10.1163/9789004250369_009. ISBN 978-90-04-25026-0. ISSN 0167-9732. S2CID 171267332.
