= Johannine epistles =

Three books of the New Testament

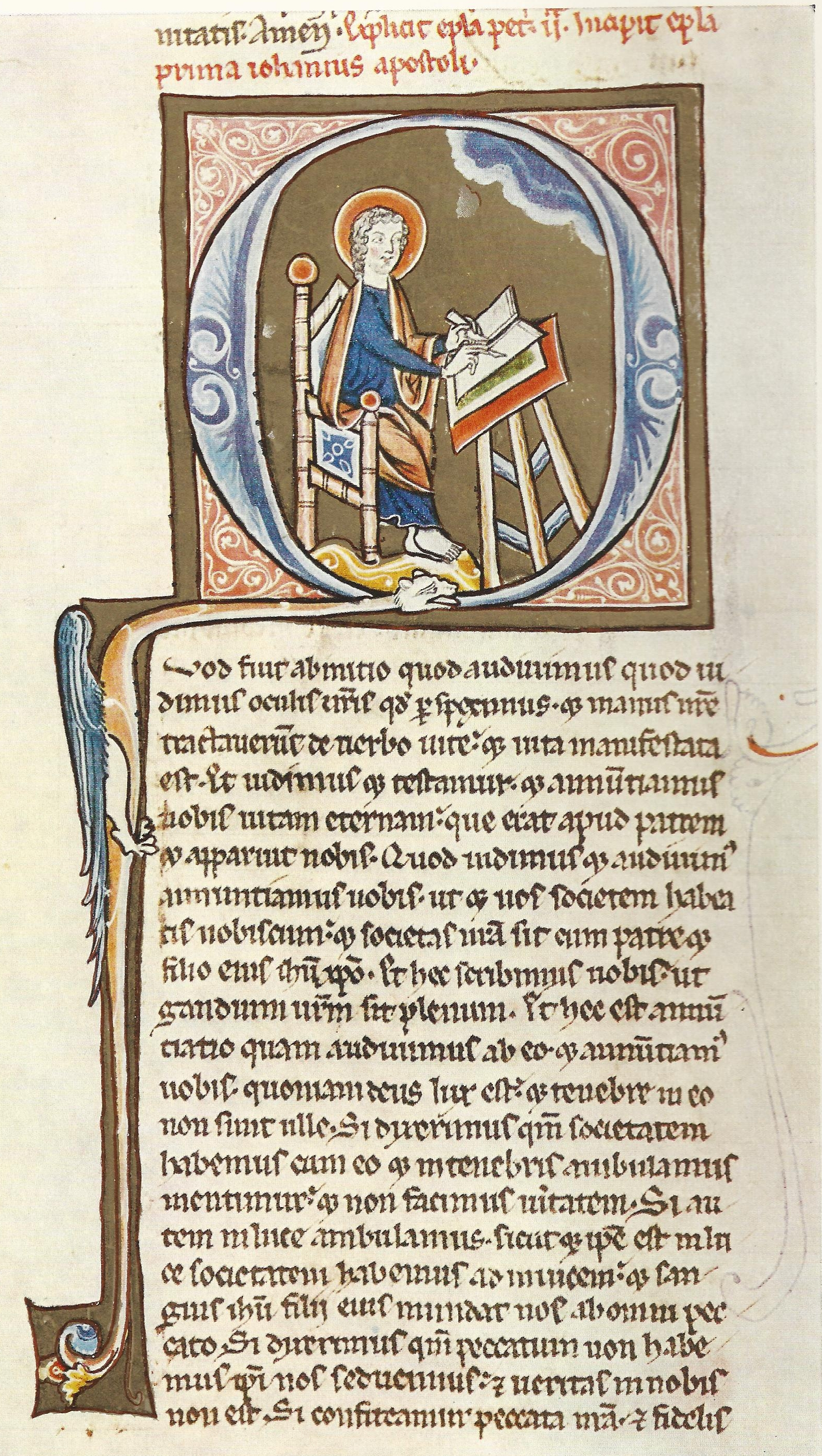
13th-century manuscript of the Vulgate, showing John writing his first letter.

The Johannine epistles, the Epistles of John, or the Letters of John are the First Epistle of John, the Second Epistle of John, and the Third Epistle of John, three of the catholic epistles in the New Testament. In content and style they resemble the Gospel of John. Specifically in the First Epistle of John, Jesus is identified with the divine Christ, and more than in any other New Testament text, God's love of humanity is emphasised.

The letters are anonymous, but since the late second century, when Irenaeus referred to the first two epistles, they have been connected to John, son of Zebedee, who according to the gospels was one of the twelve disciples and part of Jesus's closest circle. The third epistle is mentioned beginning in the middle of the third century, and due to its similarity with the Second Epistle of John (e.g. both being written by someone referred to as the elder) it was included with the other two, creating the collection known as the Johannine epistles. Athanasius's festal letter of 367 is the earliest case of the three letters being counted as catholic. While the second and third epistles appear to be real letters, the first epistle lacks both introduction and ending, more resembling an exhortatory writing or a sermon.

Most scholars assume the letters to have been written simultaneously and after the Gospel of John, dating them between AD 85 and 100. Most scholars agree that all three letters are written by the same author, although there is debate on who that author is. The idea of a Johannine community has been increasingly challenged, and there is no consensus among scholars today. A popular theory is that they were written by a presbyter, called John the Presbyter, who is named by Papias.

== Recipients ==
The Gospel of John and the Johannine Epistles were written in a short timespan to address the same set of questions. They deal with Jewish discussions and focus on the confession of Jesus as Messiah. All of the writings concern an undergoing schism or conflict, where enemies are threatening the recipients', and their communities', identity and rules. What separates the Gospel and the Epistles is not time, place, or content, but author. However, while the texts have a Jewish character, many argue that the three letters are still addressed to Christians and that the congregations to which the letters are written are probably not dominated by Jews. Others see similarities between the Johannine Epistles' dualism and the sectarian Jewish group connected to the Qumran and the Dead Sea Scrolls, often considered to be Essenes. They argue that the Johannine community can have developed from a similar schismatic Judaism.

== Epistles ==
The First Epistle of John stands out from the others due to its form, but they are united by language, style, contents, themes, and worldview. The Second and Third Epistles of John are composed as regular Greco-Roman letters, with greetings and endings, while the First Epistle of John lacks such characteristic markings and instead resembles a sermon or an exhortatory speech. Despite these differences, most scholars consider the personal and warm tone, the fact that the author discusses a certain problem, and the wish to bridge distance, to connect it with regular letter composition, granting that it was meant for a larger audience. While the First Epistle of John is the longest of all the catholic letters, the Second and Third Epistles are the shortest of all New Testament books.

The Johannine Epistles, especially the First, usually belong to a Koine Greek learner's first reading and study.

=== The First Epistle of John ===
This epistle, unlike the other two, is written more as a sermon, one to help strengthen people's faith in Jesus, to help them understand why a being as great as the Son of God would have a mortal life and a mortal's agonizing death. It begins with a prologue (1:1-4) and continues with a section focusing on God as light and the need to walk in that light (1:5-3:10). The next section focuses on the command of love: to walk like children to the God of love who has loved humanity in Christ, and to show love to each other. It also discusses recognising false prophets (3:11-5:12). The letter ends with an affirmation that those who believe in God's son's name will know that they have eternal life (5:13-21).

=== The Second Epistle of John ===
This epistle is written as a short letter from "the elder" to an unnamed "elect lady" whom he loves and her children. Within the letter, John warns about opening her home to false teachers and to always practice truth, avoiding secrecy. Many interpret the elect lady and her children to be a congregation.

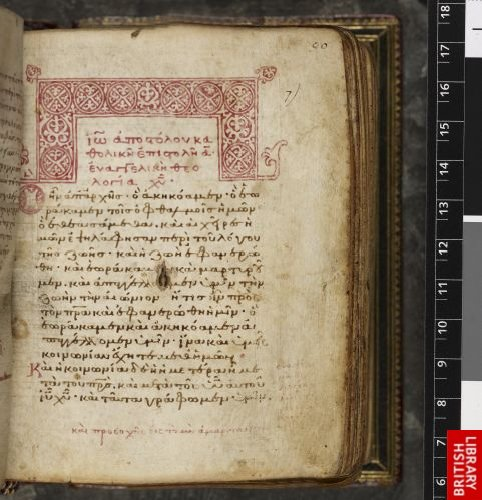
First Epistle

=== The Third Epistle of John ===
The third epistle, also a short letter from "the elder", is addressed to a man named Gaius and mentioned as "a dear friend". It talks about a man named Diotrephes who has resisted missionaries, including those sent by the elder. Diotrephes's hostility and lack of hospitality has spurned the elder to write to Gaius asking him to take more responsibility for these missionaries.

It is believed that the letter was delivered by a third person, Demetrius.

== Reception and authenticity ==
=== Canon ===
The First Epistle of John and probably the Second Epistle of John occur in the old canons. The Muratorian canon mentions two letters of John, the First and probably the Second. Both had been quoted, and explicitly attributed to John the Apostle for the first time, in Irenaeus' Against Heresies.

In his Commentary on John, Origen accepts the First Epistle as genuine but puts in doubt the other two, claiming that "not all consider them to be genuine".

Eusebius hypothesized that the first epistle alone was written by the Apostle John, while the second and the third were written by John the Elder, who had been named by Papias as an early follower of the apostles but not as an Apostle himself; Eusebius also identified John the Elder as the author of Revelation.

In the fourth century, the Western Church came to consider all three letters canonical and attributed them to John the Evangelist. The Eastern Church followed after.

=== Catholic epistles ===
Seven letters of the New Testament are traditionally called catholic. While most of them are general and not written to a specific church or person, the Second and Third Epistles of John obviously form an exception. They're written to the elect lady and Gaius, but since they were considered to belong with the First Epistle of John they came to be regarded as catholic. This may have been done because the number of catholic letters, with them included, was seven.

=== Forgeries ===
Of the seven catholic letters, the First Epistle of John and the First Epistle of Peter were most popular during the second and third centuries. They were also mostly accepted by the early church, and have the highest amount of scholars today arguing for their authenticity.

The First Epistle of John is not normally considered a forgery, not even by scholars critical of the traditional ascription of it to John, since the author never claims to be any specific person. However, Bart Ehrman, an agnostic atheist, argues that the letter should still be seen as one, as the author lies about being a witness (1 Jn 1:1-4) and having belonged to Jesus's inner circle. The purpose seems to have been to bolster the author's claim to authority and to counter the opponents' docetic teachings.

The trinitarian formula in 1 John 5:7-8, the Comma Johanneum, which has found its way into many modern bible translations, is an interpolation. It is missing from the earliest manuscripts and appears first in later editions of the Vulgate and very late Greek texts.

== Author and background ==
The question of who wrote the epistles is one of the most debated questions in Johannine studies. At least since the bishop Irenaeus's days in the late second century and since, there has been an understanding that Jesus's disciple John, son of Zebedee, wrote both the Gospel of John and the First and Second Epistles of John. Since at least the middle of the third century, this has been thought to be true for the Third Epistle of John too. However, beginning in the 19th century, this consensus has come to be more and more debated, with suggestions ranging from one author who wrote all three letters (who can but doesn't have to be John, son of Zebedee) to three individual authors for the epistles, and a fourth for the Gospel.

Those who emphasize the similarities between the Gospel of John and the Johannine Epistles often argue that one author wrote all three letters and the Gospel. Those who argue that the differences between the Gospel and the epistles are more important, usually think that different authors lie behind the writings. These suggestions vary between four authors writing the letters and the gospel, the same author writing the Second and Third Epistles of John, the same author writing the First and Second Epistles of John, to the same author writing all three letters, with another author writing the gospel. Debated candidates include John the Evangelist, an unknown presbyter in the Johaninne Community, John the Presbyter, John of Patmos, the Beloved Disciple, etc.

=== The Gospel of John and the Johannine Epistles ===
The Gospel of John and the First Epistle of John do not claim to be written by the same person. While they resemble each other in style and language, there is not enough evidence to decide if they share author. The view of the gospel of John as a communal product is today retreating in favor of authorship by a single author, as literary critics approach the work as a unitary text; most scholars interpret John 21 as a claim the beloved disciple was the author. Many scholars such as John Painter have argued that the Gospel of John and the Johannine Epistles share tangible theological and stylistic characteristics, and if they have different authors, then all authors have come from the Johannine school, but the idea of a Johannine community has been increasingly challenged, and there is no consensus among scholars today. As a rule, this movement, or its congregations, are usually placed in Ephesus or its surroundings in Anatolia on the western coast of modern Turkey.

Besides the Gospel of John and the Johannine Epistles, the Book of Revelation is considered Johannine literature. Of these five writings it's only the Book of Revelation which connects the literature to Anatolia. However, many argue against counting the Book of Revelation amongst the Johannine writings, due to its different genre, style, and theology.

=== The First Epistle of John ===
The author of the First Epistle of John never identifies himself. If they are the same person who wrote the Gospel of John or the other two Johannine epistles, is debated. Some scholars argue that the First Epistle and the Gospel were written by the same author, who is then usually identified with John the Apostle. Support for this is garnered from, besides Christian tradition, the similar vocabulary and worldview. The terminology of the epistle and gospel are similar, and dualism is apparent in both of them. They exhibit a polarised rhetoric, affecting both their portrayal of people and ideas, through word-pairs such as light-darkness, truth-lie, love-hate, life-death, we-them, children of God-children of the Devil, and more. Literary critics approach today approach John as a unitary text, though twentieth century scholars had conceptualized editorial layers.

Other reasons for the identification is that the author of 1 John claims to be an eyewitness to Christ. This circumstance, along with the direct and authoritative language, is argued by some scholars to support the idea that the author really was an eyewitness. Also, there were no other suggestions than John the Apostle for the author of the epistle in the early church.

However, the majority of scholars argue that the Gospel of John and the Johannine Epistles were written by different people. The Gospel of John and the First Epistle of John exhibit differences in vocabulary and style, their theological worldview, and their circumstances. This points to different authors. The author of the First Epistle of John does not show the same linguistic dexterity as the author of the Gospel of John. The First Epistle of John is written in the same spirit as the Gospel of John, but doesn't cite anything from it. Because of this, Udo Schnelle argues that the First Epistle of John was written after the other Johannine Epistles, but before the Gospel of John, around the year 95 and in close proximity to Ephesus.

=== The Second and Third Epistles of John ===
The Second and Third Epistles of John stand closer to each other than do they to the First Epistle of John. While all the Johannine writings share vocabulary, idiom, perspective, and worldview, the First Epistle of John stands closer to the Gospel of John. The endings of the both epistles are parallel, and are strong marks of similar authorship. They are united by their epistolary form, their ascription to "the elder", and their shared subjects. Both discuss hospitality in regards to missionary work.

The First Epistle of John is closer to the Second than the Third. The Second Epistle of John thus forms the link which unites the Johannine epistles, by being closely connected to both the First and the Third. The Third Epistle of John seems to be independent of the First Epistle of John in its language. If one only considers these two letters, there's no reason to ascribe them the same author. It is only when considered with the Second Epistle of John, with its strong connection to the First, and dito with the Third, that it emerges that all three letters probably share the same author.

John Painter has argued that it is no longer possible to trust tradition on who wrote the epistles. It is not known if they were written by the same author as the Gospel of John, or even if they were written by the same author at all. Because of the language and themes, Painter considers it likely that both the letters and the gospel are products of the Johannine school, while others challenge the notion of a Johannine community.

==== The Elder as author to the Second and Third Epistles of John ====
Both the Second and Third Epistles of John claim to be written by "the elder" (Greek: ὁ πρεσβύτερος, ho presbyteros, sometimes rendered in English as "the Presbyter"). It mainly means "the elder" as in a man who enjoys social prestige due to the experiences of a long life. However, nothing in the letters indicates that the writer's authority stems from his old age. The term presbyter could then be used to designate a congregational leader, without him being especially old. It is also a strange thing to call oneself, since there are many elders, and thus should be followed by a name. A possibility is that the term referred to a well-known and unmistakeable figure, and that it wasn't felt necessary to write the name. Many argue that for the two shorter letters (2 and 3 John) to be preserved and made canon, it's required that they would have been written by a famous figure in the Johannine school. Such a figure could have been the John that Papias mentions (preserved in Eusebius's Church History). Papias mentions a "Presbyter John", and Eusebius separates this John from the Apostle John. Many argue that "the elder" could designate a disciple of Jesus, who would be a second-generation leader.

=== The Elder as author to the First Epistle of John ===
A common perception is that the author of the First Epistle of John should also be John the Presbyter, the same person who presumably wrote both the Second and Third Epistles of John. The main argument for a common authorship of the three Johannine epistles is that they all exhibit a similar style. However, some argue that these similarities could also be due to a shared sociolect within the Johannine school, and furthermore, that there are certain differences in language and style between the First Epistle of John on the one hand and the Second and Third on the other. One argument against the identity of the authors being the same is that the true identity of the First epistle's author is not stated anywhere in the letter. Since the author of the other two letters referred to himself as "the elder," one might expect him to do the same in this letter if he had written it. Moreover, unlike the other letters, the First Epistle of John lacks the typical features of a proper letter. Its contents partially differ from that of the other two letters. However, even if it's possible that the letters have different authors, there are strong reasons to believe they were written by one person. Since the First Epistle of John is not a typical letter, one cannot expect the author to identify himself in the same way as in the other two, which follow the typical Greco-Roman letter format. The differences between the letters do not necessarily preclude them from having been written by one person. The obvious similarities in vocabulary, theme, and language have convinced most scholars that the same person wrote all three letters.

=== Christian tradition after Irenaeus ===
Irenaeus's judgement was hugely influential, and it can be presumed that Tertullian writing in the early third century followed him in accepting John the Evangelist as the author of the epistles and the Book of Revelation also. In the late third century, Dionysios questioned if the Apostle, son of Zebedee (whom he accepted as the Evangelist and author of the Johannine epistles) could have written such a different book as the Book of Revelation.

== Chronological order ==
Nobody knows in which order the three Johannine epistles were written. Neither church tradition nor internal evidence give any sure leads, and they are placed in order of length, with the longest first.

=== The order 3-2-1 John ===
Some prefer the order 3-2-1, since the Third Epistle of John discusses a conflict which seems to be solved in the First Epistle of John. However, it is not known if the letters are to the same congregation, and if it is the same conflict which is referred to.

=== The order 1-2-3 John ===
Others prefer the order 1-2-3, since the content of the epistles proceed from a more theoretical perspective to one a concrete problem. According to the Third Epistle of John, "the elder" has already written to Gaius's congregation. Some assume that this writing is the First Epistle of John, which would put it before the third. John Painter thinks that there are good reasons to assume that the Second Epistle of John was an introduction to the first, which would explain why Irenaeus seems to consider them to be one single letter. Others argue that there is nothing speaking for the First Epistle of John being addressed to the same congregation as the other two epistles. Otherwise, it's hard to understand why the Second and Third epistles took so long to be canonised.

The Second Epistle of John seems to be summarising the First. This would imply that the First preceded the Second, which in turn preceded the Third.

=== The order 2-3-1 John ===
Furthermore others argue for the order 2-3-1, since the Third Epistle of John seems to refer to the Second, and that the title "the elder" points to an early period within the Johannine school.

== Dating ==
All three Johannine epistles are assumed to have been written simultaneously, in a span of at most 10 years. Their dating depends partly on the Gospel of John. The first quarter of the twenty-first century saw dramatic shifts to Johannine studies, with recent trends in favor of John having a single author; the view of the gospel as a communal product of multiple editorial layers is today in retreat. A scholarly consensus dates the writing of the gospel between AD 90–100. The epistles are usually dated to around the year 100, or the end of the first century. They are thus usually dated to 95-100. Daniel L. Akin represents a minority position and dates the letters to the period 85-100. Lars Hartman dates the letters no later than the year 100. Udo Schnelle thinks that the third letter was written shortly after the second, around the year 90. Raymond E. Brown dates the letters to around the year 100.

A few scholars argue for a much earlier compositional date, before the year 70, and a few for a much later date, in the middle of the second century and as late as 170-180, but these datings have not won much support in academia.

== See also ==
- Authorship of the Johannine works
- Johannine Christianity
- Johannine Comma
- Johannine literature

== Sources ==
- Mendez, Hugo (2025). The Gospel of John: A New History. Oxford University Press. ISBN 978-0-19768612-6.
