= Johannine community =

Ancient Christian community

The term Johannine community refers to a hypothesized ancient Christian community which placed great emphasis on the Gospel of John, which elaborated on teachings attributed to Jesus that were not present in the Gospels of Mark, Luke, and Matthew.

Their particular Christian practices, rituals, and theology may be referred to as Johannine Christianity. The Johannine community hypothesis, which led scholarship for much of the twentieth century, has lost its dominance in contemporary scholarship, which tends to treat the gospel as the work of an individual author for a wide audience.

== Scholarship ==
According to Attridge, this community of early followers of Jesus "defined themselves rather starkly against the Jewish milieu in which they arose, these believers cultivated an intense devotion to Jesus as the definitive revelation of God's salvific will. They understood themselves to be in intimate contact with him and with one another, under the guidance of the Spirit-Paraclete. They were conscious of their relationship to other believers with whom they hoped to be in eventual union. Their piety found distinctive expression in a reflective literary corpus that explored new ways of expressing faith in Jesus."

"Their common life included ritual actions known to other followers of Jesus, but they insisted on the unique spiritual value of those rites. Disputes eventually divided the community. By the middle of the second century some representatives of the Johannine tradition achieved a respected role in the emerging 'Great Church', the interconnected web of believers throughout the Mediterranean that provided mutual support and maintained fellowship under the leadership of emerging episcopal authorities. The Johannine community of the first century bequeathed to the universal church its distinctive literary corpus and estimation of Jesus, which came to dominate the development of later Christian orthodoxy. Other representatives of Johannine Christianity, nurturing alternative strands of tradition, influenced various second-century movements, characterized by their opponents and much modern scholarship as 'Gnostic'."

In his studies of the historical John the Baptist, James F. McGrath discusses what the historical Johannine community may have been like.

== Debate ==
The Johannine community hypothesis, which led scholarship for much of the twentieth century, has lost its dominance in contemporary scholarship, with recent scholarship treating the gospel as the work of an individual author. The hypothesis claimed a late-1st-century Christian community excommunicated from the Jewish synagogue (probably meaning the Jewish community) on account of its belief in Jesus as the promised Jewish messiah. This interpretation, which saw the community as essentially sectarian and standing outside the mainstream of early Christianity, has been increasingly challenged in the first decades of the 21st century, and there is currently considerable debate over the social, religious, and historical context of the gospel. Scholars including Adele Reinhartz and Robert Kysar have challenged the idea of a Johannine community, and cite the lack of evidence for such a community. Nevertheless, scholars such as Attridge have maintained that the Johannine literature as a whole (made up of the gospel, the three Johannine epistles, and Revelation), points to a community holding itself distinct from the Jewish culture from which it arose while cultivating an intense devotion to Jesus as the definitive revelation of a God with whom they were in close contact through the Holy Spirit (Paraclete).

In 2007, an attack on the notion of a Johannine community was brought on by Anglican biblical scholar Richard Bauckham in his book Jesus and the Eyewitnesses, where Bauckham argued that the Gospel of John was actually written by John the Presbyter, who was, in his view, the Beloved Disciple. He also considers him to be the author of the Johannine Epistles, while the Book of Revelation was, according to Bauckham, written by John of Patmos. These views echo those of Lutheran scholar Martin Hengel (University of Tübingen), who had theorized in 2000 that the Gospel of John and the Johannine Epistles were authored by John the Presbyter, who, in his view, was a disciple of John the Apostle; in turn, Hengel viewed John the Presbyter as the teacher of Papias of Hierapolis, a view that had already been sometimes espoused by Eusebius in the 4th century CE.

More recently, the existence of a Johannine Community has been challenged by Hugo Méndez (University of North Carolina at Chapel Hill). In an article on the Journal for the Study of the New Testament, Méndez argued that there was never a Johannine community and that the Gospel of John and the Johannine Epistles were written by a series of authors writing under a single identity. Méndez' thesis received a detailed critique by Johannine scholar Paul N. Anderson (George Fox University) on The Bible and Interpretation, to which Méndez responded with another article on the same publication.

== See also ==
- Johannine Comma
- Johannine epistles
- Johannine literature
