= Johannine sectarianism =

Johannine sectarianism is the sharp distinction perceived to be made between the community and outsiders in the texts ascribed to the Johannine community; the Gospel of John and the First, Second and Third Epistles of John. The Johannine community was first described as sectarian in a 1972 paper by Wayne A. Meeks. The application of the sociological category of "sect" in Johannine studies has been criticised by many scholars, including Ruth Sheridan.

== Bibliography ==
- Segovia, Fernando F. (April 1982). "The Love and Hatred of Jesus and Johannine Sectarianism". The Catholic Biblical Quarterly. 43 (2). Catholic Biblical Association: 258–272. JSTOR 43716035.
- Fuglseth, Kåre Sigvald (1 September 2005). Johannine Sectarianism in Perspective: A Sociological, Historical, and Comparative Analysis of Temple and Social Relationships in the Gospel of John, Philo and Qumran. Novum Testamentum, Supplements. BRILL. ISBN 978-90-47-41562-6. ISSN 0167-9732.
- Sheridan, Ruth (2016). "Johannine Sectarianism: A Category Now Defunct?". The Origins of John's Gospel. BRILL. pp. 142–166. doi:10.1163/9789004303164_009. ISBN 978-90-04-30316-4.
