= Johannine literature =

New Testament works attributed to John

Johannine literature is the collection of New Testament works that are traditionally attributed to John the Apostle, John the Evangelist, or to the Johannine community. They are usually dated to the period c. AD 60–110, with a minority of scholars, including Anglican bishop John Robinson, offering the earliest of these datings.

== List ==
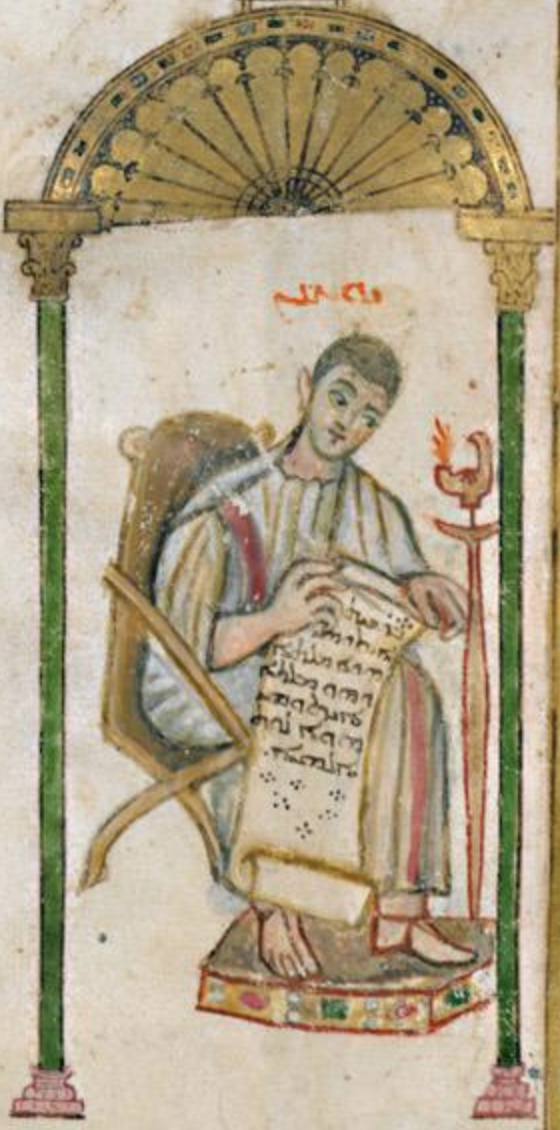
A Syriac Christian rendition of St. John the Evangelist, from the Rabbula Gospels, 6th century.

Johannine literature is traditionally considered to include the following works:

- The Gospel of John
- The Johannine epistles
  - The First Epistle of John
  - The Second Epistle of John
  - The Third Epistle of John
- The Book of Revelation

== Authorship ==
Of these five books, the only one that explicitly identifies its author as "[God's] servant John" (Ancient Greek: Ἰωάννης, romanized: Iōannēs) is Revelation. Modern scholarship generally rejects the idea that this work is written by the same author as the other four documents. The gospel identifies its author as the disciple whom Jesus loved, commonly identified with John the Evangelist since the end of the first century.

Scholars have debated the authorship of Johannine literature (the Gospel of John, Epistles of John, and the Book of Revelation) since at least the third century, but especially since the Enlightenment. The authorship by John the Apostle is rejected by many modern scholars.

== See also ==
- Apocryphon of John
- Second Apocalypse of John
