= John the Apostle =

Apostle of Jesus (6–100)

Saint John the Apostle
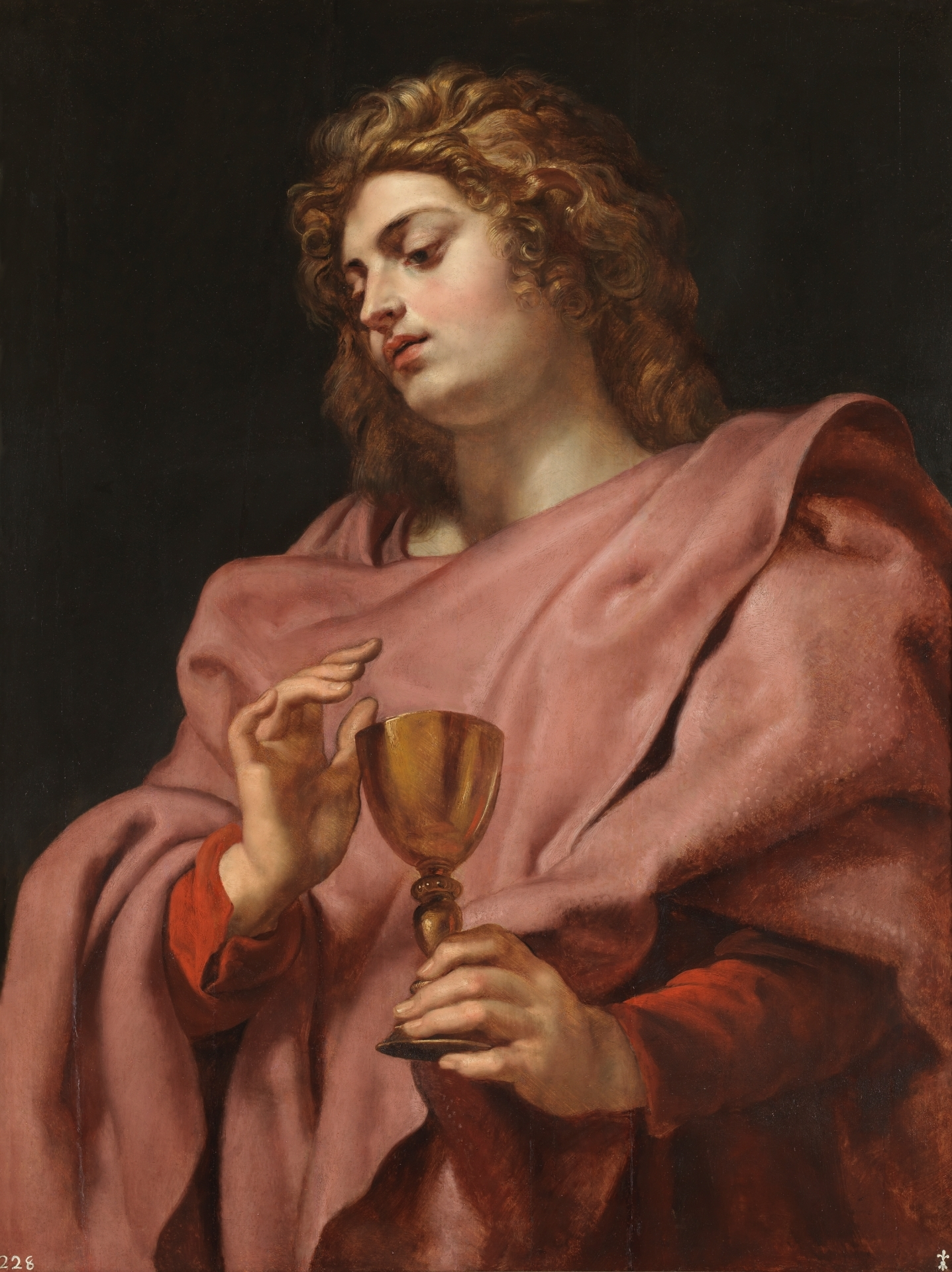
- Portrait by Peter Paul Rubens, c. 1611

Apostle, Evangelist and Theologian
- Born: c. 6 AD; Bethsaida, Galilee, Roman Empire
- Died: c. 100 AD (aged 93) place unknown, probably Ephesus, Roman Empire
- Venerated in: All Christian denominations which venerate saints Islam (named as one of the disciples of Jesus); Druze faith
- Canonized: Pre-congregation
- Feast: 27 December (Roman Catholic, Anglican); 26 September (Eastern Orthodox)
- Attributes: Eagle, gospel, serpent in a chalice, cauldron
- Patronage: Love, loyalty, friendships, authors, booksellers, burn-victims, poison-victims, art-dealers, editors, publishers, scribes, examinations, scholars, theologians, Asia Minor, against jealousy and envy
- Influences: Jesus
- Influenced: Ignatius of Antioch, Polycarp, Papias of Hierapolis, Odes of Solomon

John the Apostle (Ancient Greek: Ἰωάννης; Latin: Ioannes; c. 6 AD – c. 100 AD), also known as Saint John the Beloved and, in Eastern Orthodox Christianity, Saint John the Theologian, was one of the Twelve Apostles of Jesus according to the New Testament. Generally listed as the youngest apostle, he was the son of Zebedee and Salome. His brother James was another of the Twelve Apostles. The Church Fathers identify him as John the Evangelist, John of Patmos, John the Elder, and the Beloved Disciple, and then claimed that he outlived the remaining apostles and was the only one to die of natural causes, although modern scholars are divided on the veracity of these claims.

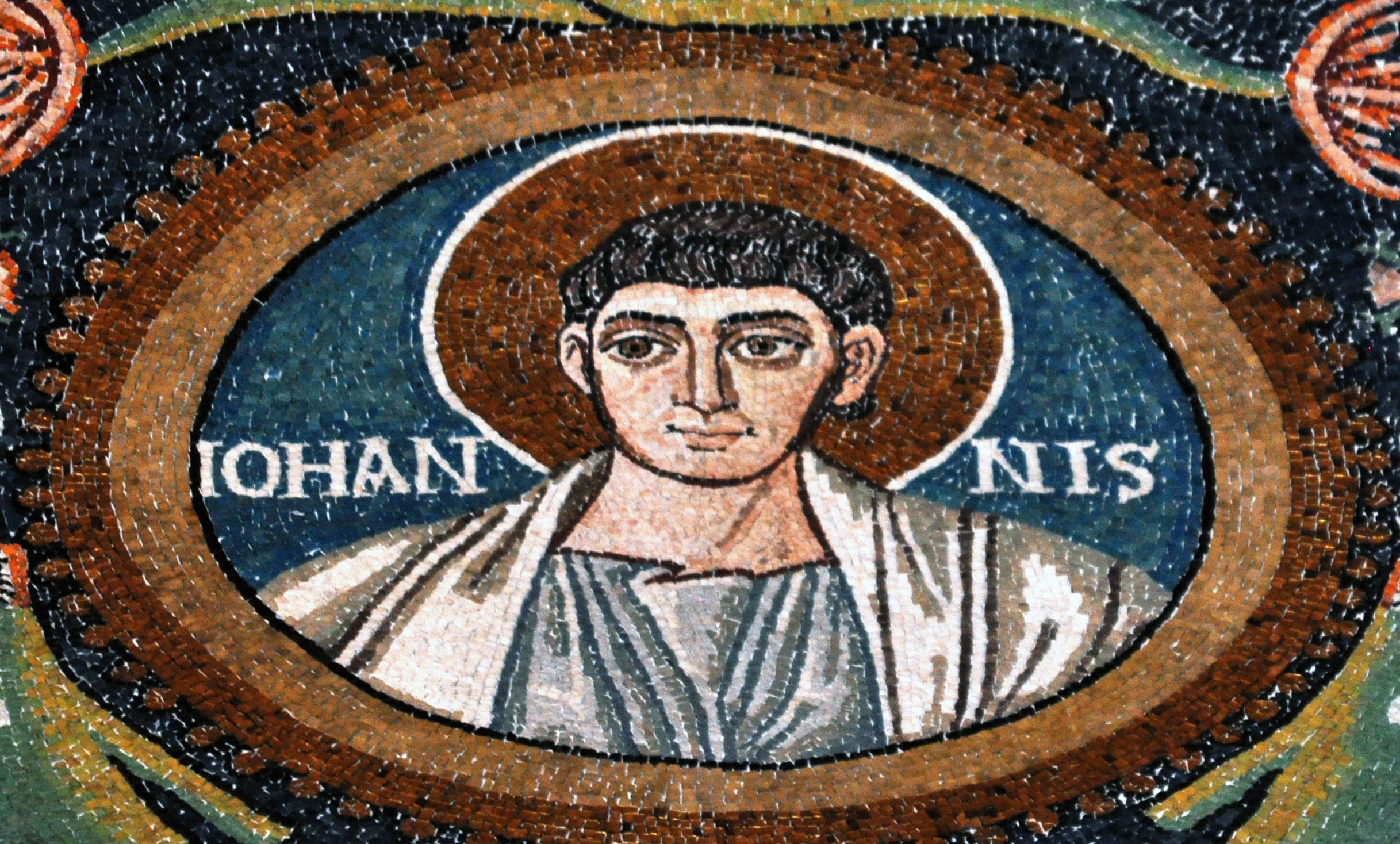
John the Apostle, detail of the mosaic in the Basilica of San Vitale, Ravenna, 6th century

John the Apostle is traditionally held to be the author of the Gospel of John, and many Christian denominations believe that he authored several other books of the New Testament (the three Johannine epistles and the Book of Revelation, together with the Gospel of John, are called the Johannine works), depending on whether he is distinguished from, or identified with, John the Evangelist, John the Elder, and John of Patmos.

The authorship of the Johannine works has traditionally been attributed to John the Apostle. While many modern scholars continue to affirm traditional authorship, a plurality attribute John the Elder as the fourth evangelist instead, while an increasing number view the figure as a literary creation. Regardless of whether or not John the Apostle wrote any of the Johannine works, most scholars agree that all three epistles were written by the same author and that the epistles did not have the same author as the Book of Revelation, although there is widespread disagreement among scholars as to whether the author of the epistles was different from that of the gospel.

== References to John in the New Testament ==
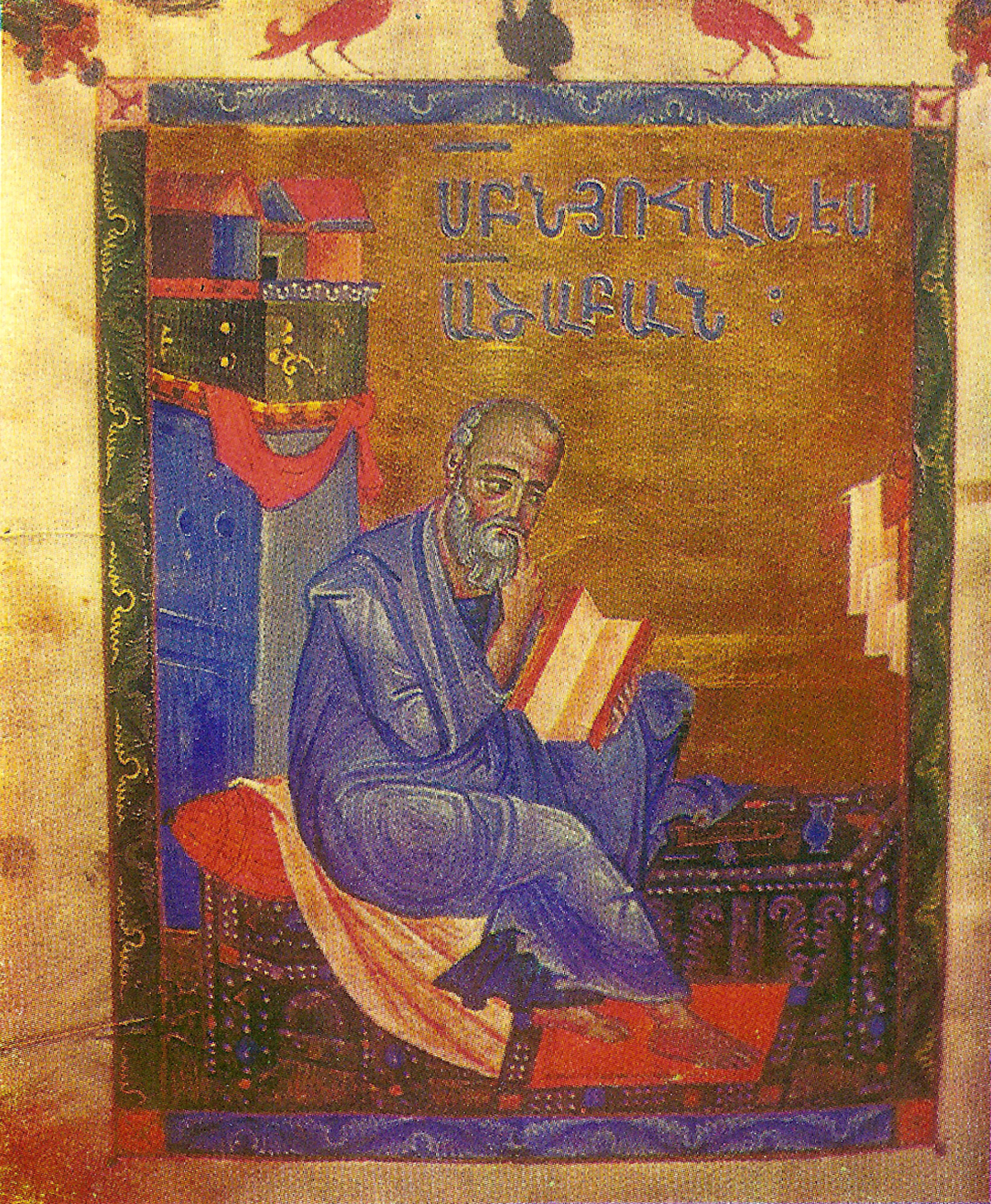
Armenian icon of the Apostle and Evangelist John the Theologian, 13th century by the Armenian manuscript illuminator Toros Roslin

John the Apostle was born into a family of Jewish fishermen on the Sea of Galilee. He was a son of Zebedee and the younger brother of James (James the Great). According to church tradition, their mother was Salome. And according to some traditions, Salome was the sister of Mary, Jesus' mother, making Salome Jesus' aunt, and her sons James and John the Apostle, cousins of Jesus.

John the Apostle is traditionally believed to be one of two disciples (the other being Andrew) recounted in John 1:35–39, who upon hearing the Baptist point out Jesus as the "Lamb of God", followed Jesus and spent the day with him, thus becoming the first two disciples called by Jesus. On this basis some traditions believe that John was first a disciple of John the Baptist, even though he is not named in this episode.

According to the Synoptic Gospels (Matt 4:18–22; Mark 1:16–20; Luke 5:1–11), Zebedee and his sons fished in the Sea of Galilee. Jesus then called Peter, Andrew, and the two sons of Zebedee to follow him; showing that James and John were counted early among the Twelve Apostles. Jesus referred to the pair as "Boanerges" (translated "sons of thunder"). A Gospel story relates how the brothers wanted to call down heavenly fire on an unhospitable Samaritan town, but Jesus rebuked them. And John was the disciple who reported to Jesus that they had 'forbidden' a non-disciple from casting out demons in Jesus' name, prompting Jesus to state that 'he who is not against us is on our side'.

In AD 44, James became the first Apostle to die a martyr's death. John the Apostle is traditionally believed to have lived on for more than fifty years after the martyrdom of his brother James.

=== Position among the apostles ===
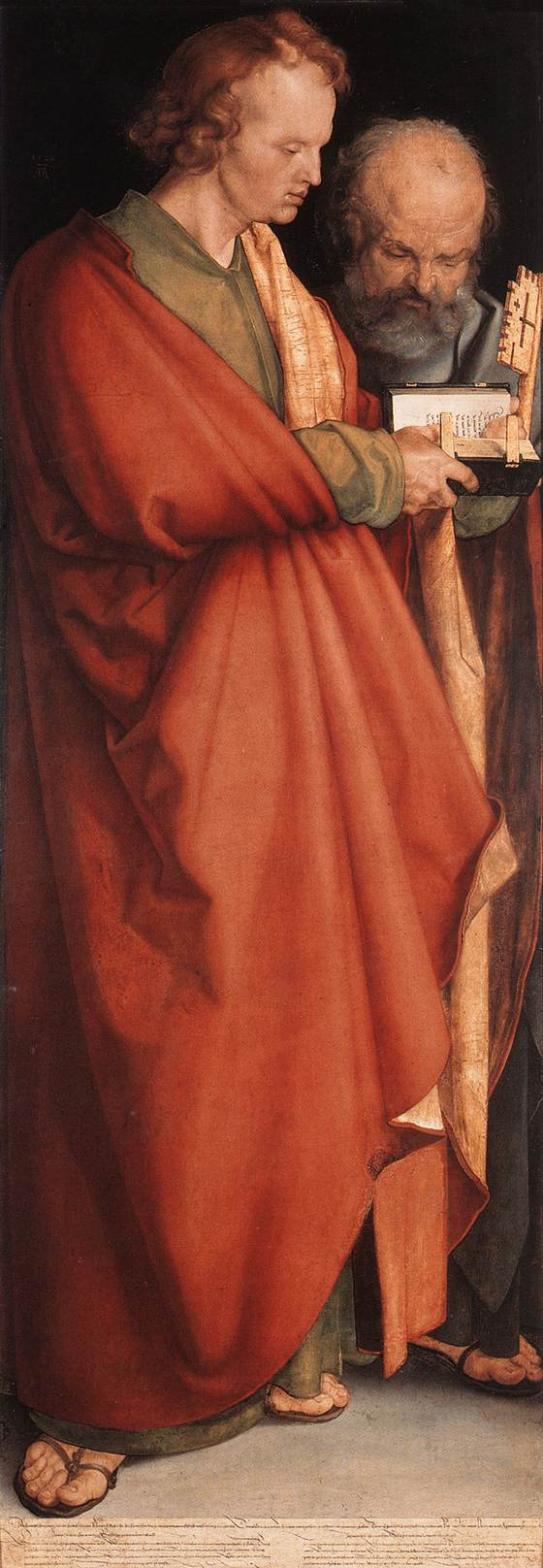
John the Evangelist and Peter by Albrecht Dürer (1526)

In the Gospels and in the Book of Acts, the Apostle John is always mentioned in the group of the first four apostles, listed either second, third or fourth.

John, his brother James, and Peter formed an informal triumvirate among the Twelve Apostles in the Gospels. Jesus appointed them to be the only apostles to accompany him at three particular occasions during his public ministry: the Raising of Jairus' daughter, the Transfiguration of Jesus, and the Agony in the Garden of Gethsemane.

Jesus sent only Peter and John into the city to make the preparation for the final Passover meal (the Last Supper).

Many traditions identify the Apostle John as the "disciple whom Jesus loved" in the Gospel of John, but this identification is debated. At the meal itself, the "disciple whom Jesus loved" sat next to Jesus. It was customary to recline on couches at meals, and this disciple leaned on Jesus. Tradition identifies this disciple as John.

After the arrest of Jesus in the Garden of Gethsemane, only Peter and the "other disciple" (according to tradition, John) followed him into the palace of the high-priest. The "beloved disciple", alone among the Apostles, remained near Jesus at the foot of the cross on Calvary alongside myrrhbearers and numerous other women. Following the instruction of Jesus from the Cross, the beloved disciple took Mary, the mother of Jesus, into his care as the last legacy of Jesus. Peter and John were also the only two apostles who ran to the empty tomb after Mary Magdalene bore witness to the resurrection of Jesus.

After Jesus' Ascension and the descent of the Holy Spirit at Pentecost, the Apostle John, together with Peter, took a prominent part in the founding and guidance of the church. He was with Peter at the healing of the lame man at Solomon's Porch in the Temple; and he was thrown into prison with Peter. Later, only Peter and John went to visit the newly converted believers in Samaria.

While John remained in Judea and the surrounding area, the other disciples returned to Jerusalem for the Apostolic Council (c. 48–50 AD). Paul the Apostle, in opposing his enemies in Galatia, explicitly recalled that John, Peter and James the Just, were collectively recognized as the three Pillars of the Church. And Paul referred to the recognition that his Apostolic preaching of a gospel free from Jewish Law was received from these three, the most prominent men of the messianic community at Jerusalem.

=== The disciple whom Jesus loved ===
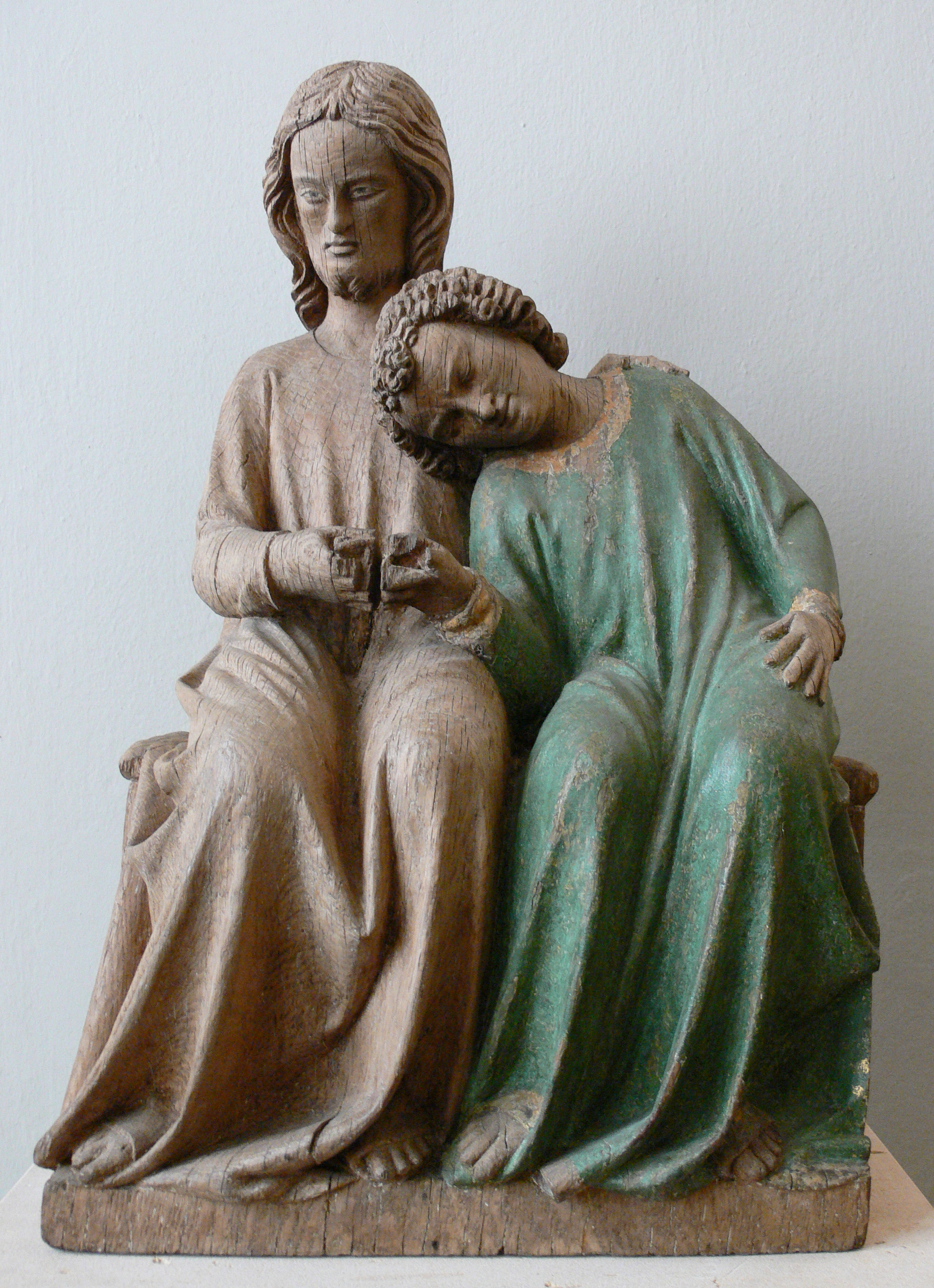
Jesus and the Beloved Disciple

The phrase "the disciple whom Jesus loved"—(ὁ μαθητὴς ὃν ἠγάπα ὁ Ἰησοῦς, ho mathētēs hon ēgapā ho Iēsous), or in John 20:2: "whom Jesus loved" (ὃν ἐφίλει ὁ Ἰησοῦς, hon ephilei ho Iēsous)—is used six times in the Gospel of John and in no other New Testament accounts of Jesus. And John 21:24 claims that the Gospel of John is based on the written testimony of this disciple.

The disciple whom Jesus loved is specifically referred to six times in the Gospel of John:

- It is this disciple who, while reclining beside Jesus at the Last Supper, asks Jesus, after being requested by Peter to do so, who it is that will betray him.
- Later at the crucifixion, Jesus tells his mother, "Woman, here is your son", and to the Beloved Disciple he says, "Here is your mother."
- When Mary Magdalene discovers the empty tomb, she runs to tell the Beloved Disciple and Peter. The two men rush to the empty tomb and the Beloved Disciple is the first to reach the empty tomb. Peter, however, is the first to enter.
- In the last chapter of the Gospel of John, (John 21), the Beloved Disciple is one of seven fishermen involved in the miraculous catch of 153 fish.
- Also in the book's final chapter, after Jesus hints to Peter how Peter will die, Peter sees the Beloved Disciple following them and asks, "What about him?" Jesus answers, "If I want him to remain until I come, what is that to you? You follow Me!"
- Again in the Gospel's last chapter, it states that the very book itself is based on the written testimony of the disciple whom Jesus loved.

None of the other gospels includes anyone in the parallel scenes that could be directly understood as the Beloved Disciple. For example, in Luke 24:12, Peter alone runs to the tomb. The gospels Mark, Matthew and Luke do not mention any one of the twelve disciples having witnessed the crucifixion.

There are also two references to an unnamed "other disciple" in John 1:35–40 and John 18:15–16, which may be to the same person based on the wording in John 20:2.

== New Testament author ==
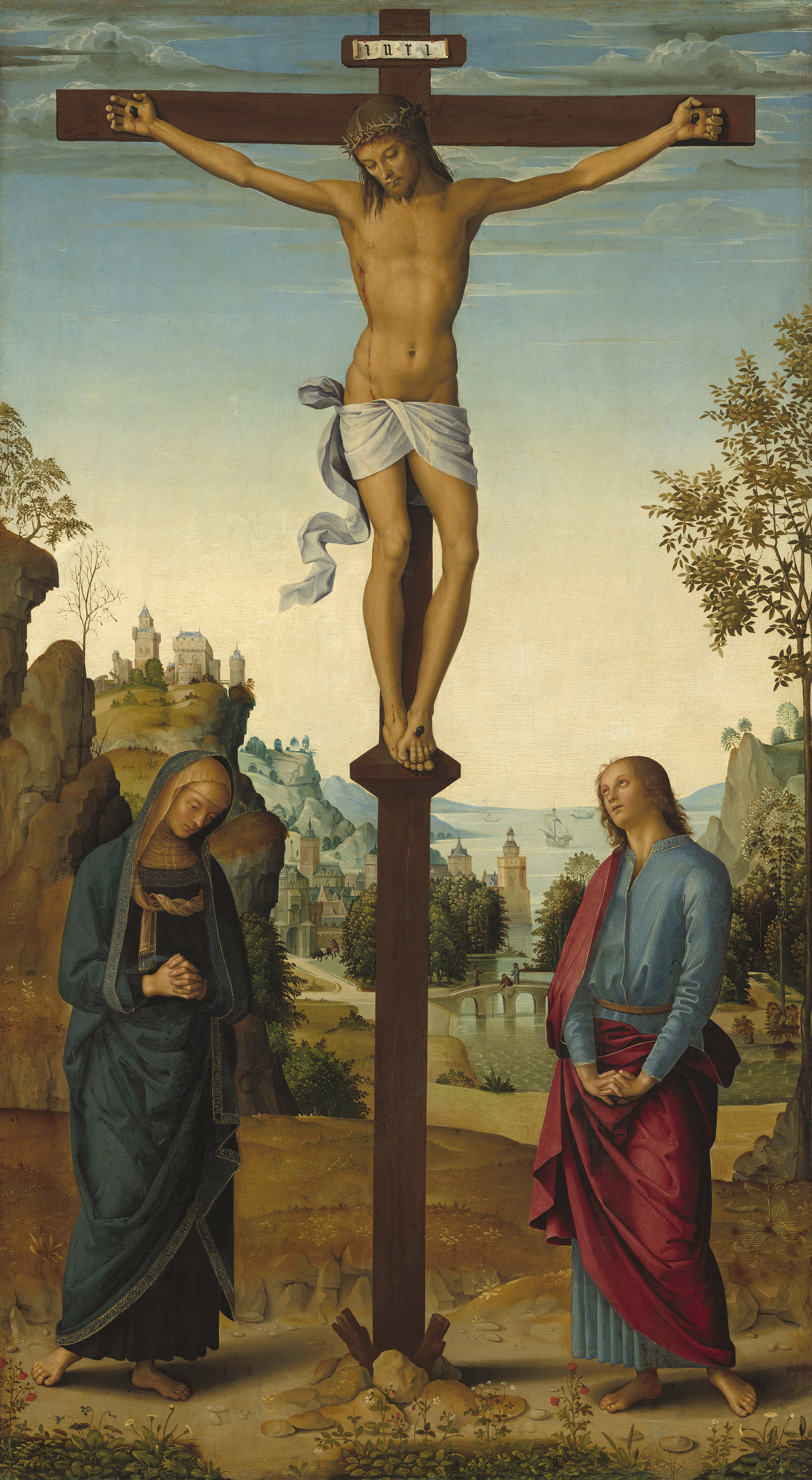
St. John at the Crucifixion of Jesus in a Stabat Mater by Pietro Perugino, c. 1482

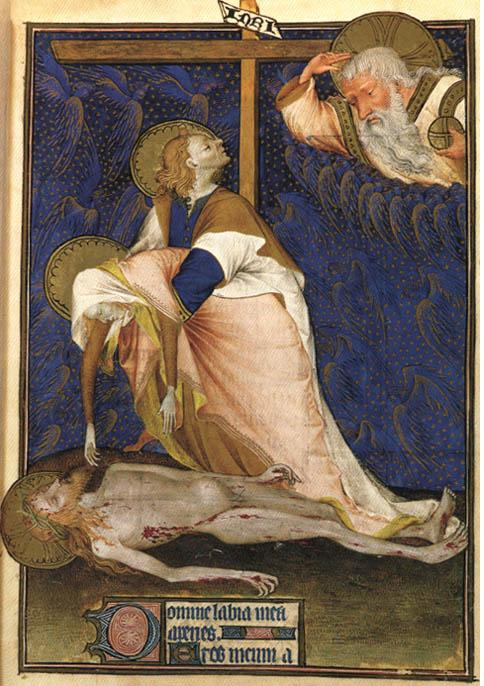
Lamentation of the Virgin. John the Apostle trying to console Mary, 1435

Church tradition has held that the Apostle John is the author of the Gospel of John and four other books of the New Testament, namely the three Epistles of John and the Book of Revelation, all which taken together are known as the Johannine literature. However, the authorship of some Johannine literature has been debated since about the year 200 AD.

In his 4th century Ecclesiastical History, Eusebius says that the First Epistle of John and the Gospel of John are widely agreed as of the Apostle John. However, Eusebius mentions that the second and third epistles of John were disputed, and that those rejecting these two epistles were not reading them in the churches. Eusebius also goes to some length to establish with the reader that there is no general consensus regarding the "revelation of John"—and that the revelation of John could only be what is now called the Book of Revelation.

The Gospel of John differs considerably from the Synoptic Gospels, which were likely written decades earlier. The bishops of Asia Minor supposedly requested him to write his gospel to deal with the heresy of the Ebionites, who asserted that Christ did not exist before Mary. John probably knew of the Gospels of Matthew, Mark, and Luke, but these gospels spoke of Jesus primarily in the year following the imprisonment and death of John the Baptist. However, around 600 AD, Sophronius of Jerusalem noted that "two epistles bearing his name ... are considered by some to be the work of a certain John the Elder";—and, while stating that Revelation was written by John of Patmos, it was "later translated by Justin Martyr and Irenaeus"—presumably in an attempt to reconcile tradition with the obvious differences in Greek style.

Until the 19th century, the authorship of the Gospel of John had been attributed to the Apostle John. Many modern scholars such as Colin G. Kruse continue to affirm traditional authorship, but a plurality attribute John the Elder as the fourth evangelist instead or view Lazarus as the disciple. Although most continue to view the "beloved disciple" as the source for much of the gospel's content, an increasing number of scholars argue the disciple was a literary creation rather than a historical figure. Tom Thatcher argues that while the beloved disciple did not write the current form of the gospel, such a thesis does not entail later reconstructions that would place the actual author at multiple stages from the beloved disciple. Instead, Thatcher argues that the author was a companion of the beloved disciple who was writing by that disciple's dictation—as either an amanuensis or as an expansion of his work. Some scholars place the Gospel of John somewhere between AD 65 and 85; Some scholars such as John Robinson proposed two or three stages of composition, though recent scholarship trends towards synchronic or unitary composition. Most contemporary scholars consider that the Gospel was not written until the latter third of the first century AD; the earliest possible date is AD 75–80, with scholarly consensus dating the writing of the gospel between AD 90–100. Although the Fourth Gospel presents its narrator as a witness in the prologue and the Beloved Disciple in 19:35 and 21:24, it does not name its author as John the Apostle, the gospel's advanced literary Greek and the gospel’s radically different portrayal of Jesus compared to other New Testament writings cast doubt on the traditional attribution. As a result, some scholars suggest alternative identities for the Beloved Disciple such as Lazarus or an unnamed disciple of Jesus, while another possibility is that the disciple was simply a literary device.

=== Book of Revelation ===
According to the Book of Revelation, its author was on the island of Patmos "for the word of God and for the testimony of Jesus", when he was honoured with the vision contained in Revelation.

The author of the Book of Revelation identifies himself as "Ἰωάννης" ("John" in standard English translation). The early 2nd-century writer Justin Martyr was the first to equate the author of Revelation with John the Apostle. However, most biblical scholars now contend that these were separate individuals since the text was written around 100 AD, after the death of John the Apostle, although many historians have defended the identification of the Author of the Gospel of John with that of the Book of Revelation based on the similarity of the two texts.

John the Presbyter, an obscure figure in the early church, has also been identified with the seer of the Book of Revelation by such authors as Eusebius in his Church History (Book III, 39) and Jerome.

John is considered to have been exiled to Patmos, during the persecutions under Emperor Domitian. Revelation 1:9 says that the author wrote the book on Patmos: "I, John, both your brother and companion in tribulation, ... was on the island that is called Patmos for the word of God and for the testimony of Jesus Christ." Adela Yarbro Collins, a biblical scholar at Yale Divinity School, writes:

Early tradition says that John was banished to Patmos by the Roman authorities. This tradition is credible because banishment was a common punishment used during the Imperial period for a number of offenses. Among such offenses were the practices of magic and astrology. Prophecy was viewed by the Romans as belonging to the same category, whether Pagan, Jewish, or Christian. Prophecy with political implications, like that expressed by John in the book of Revelation, would have been perceived as a threat to Roman political power and order. Three of the islands in the Sporades were places where political offenders were banished. (Pliny Natural History 4.69–70; Tacitus Annals 4.30)

Some modern critical scholars have raised the possibility that John the Apostle, John the Evangelist, and John of Patmos were three separate individuals. These scholars assert that John of Patmos wrote Revelation but neither the Gospel of John nor the Epistles of John. The author of Revelation identifies himself as "John" several times, but the author of the Gospel of John never identifies himself directly. Some Catholic scholars state that "vocabulary, grammar, and style make it doubtful that the book could have been put into its present form by the same person(s) responsible for the fourth gospel."

== Extrabiblical traditions ==
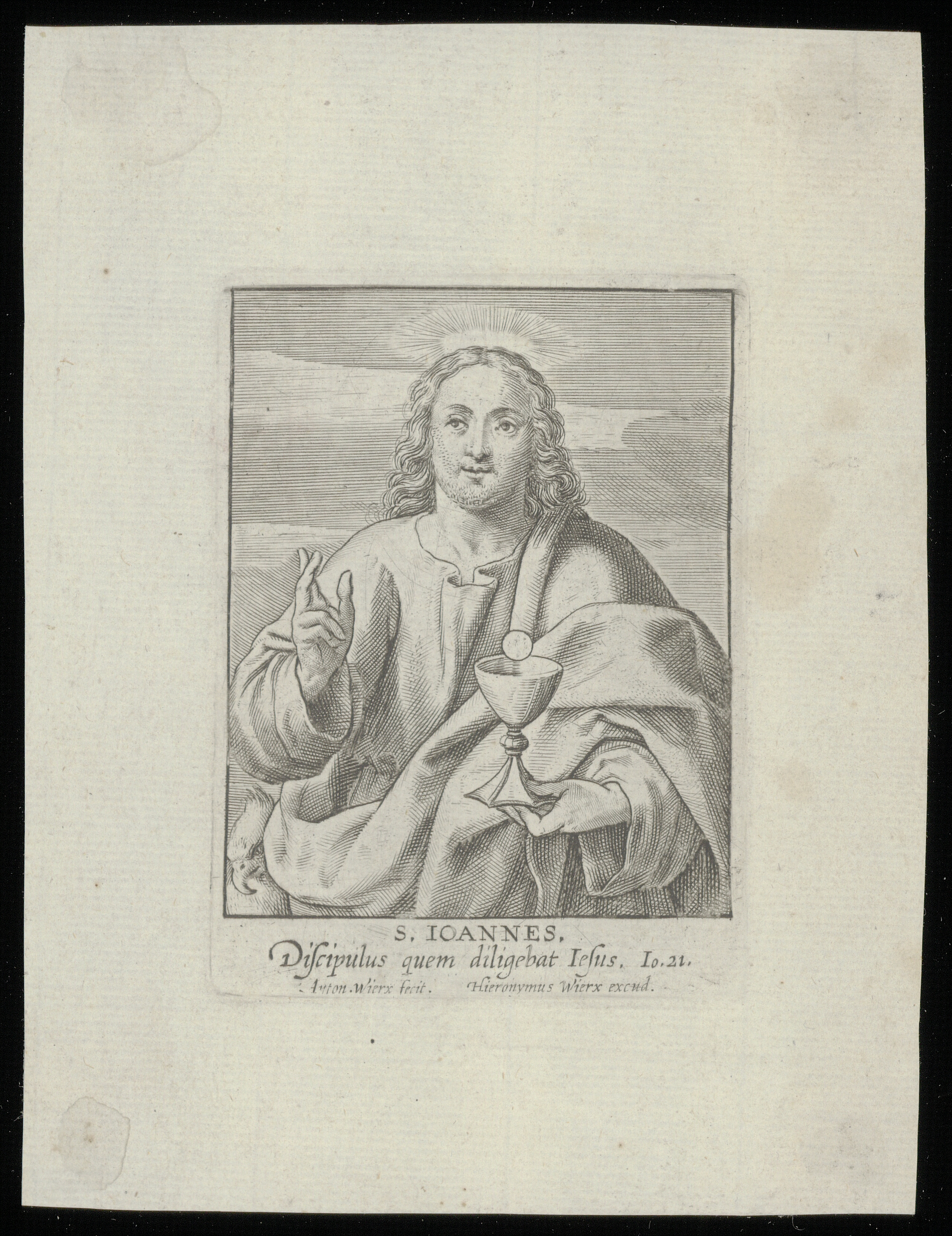
Print of John the Apostle made at ca. the end of the 16th c. – the beginning of the 17th c.

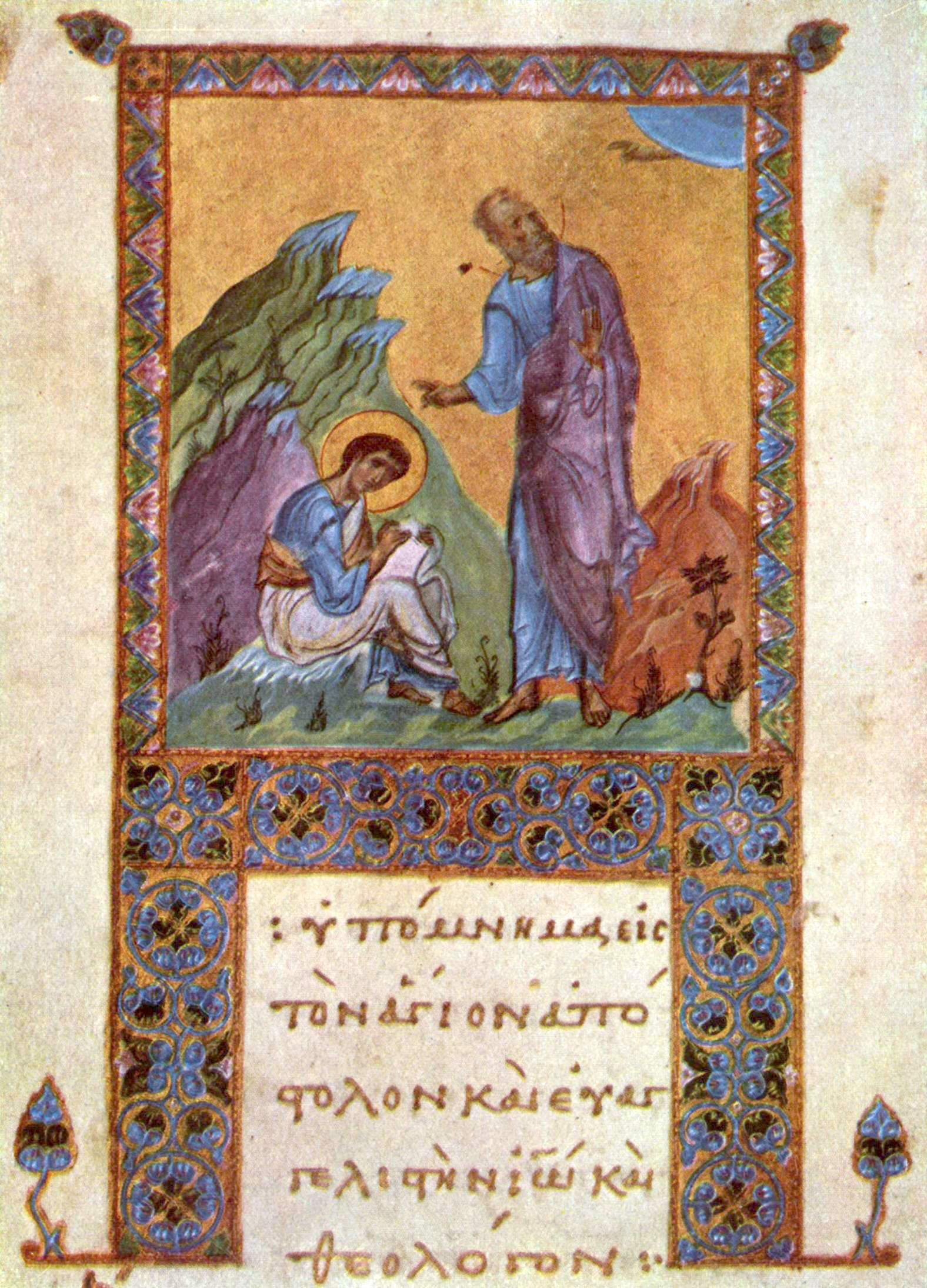
Byzantine illumination depicting John dictating to his disciple, Prochorus (c. 1100)

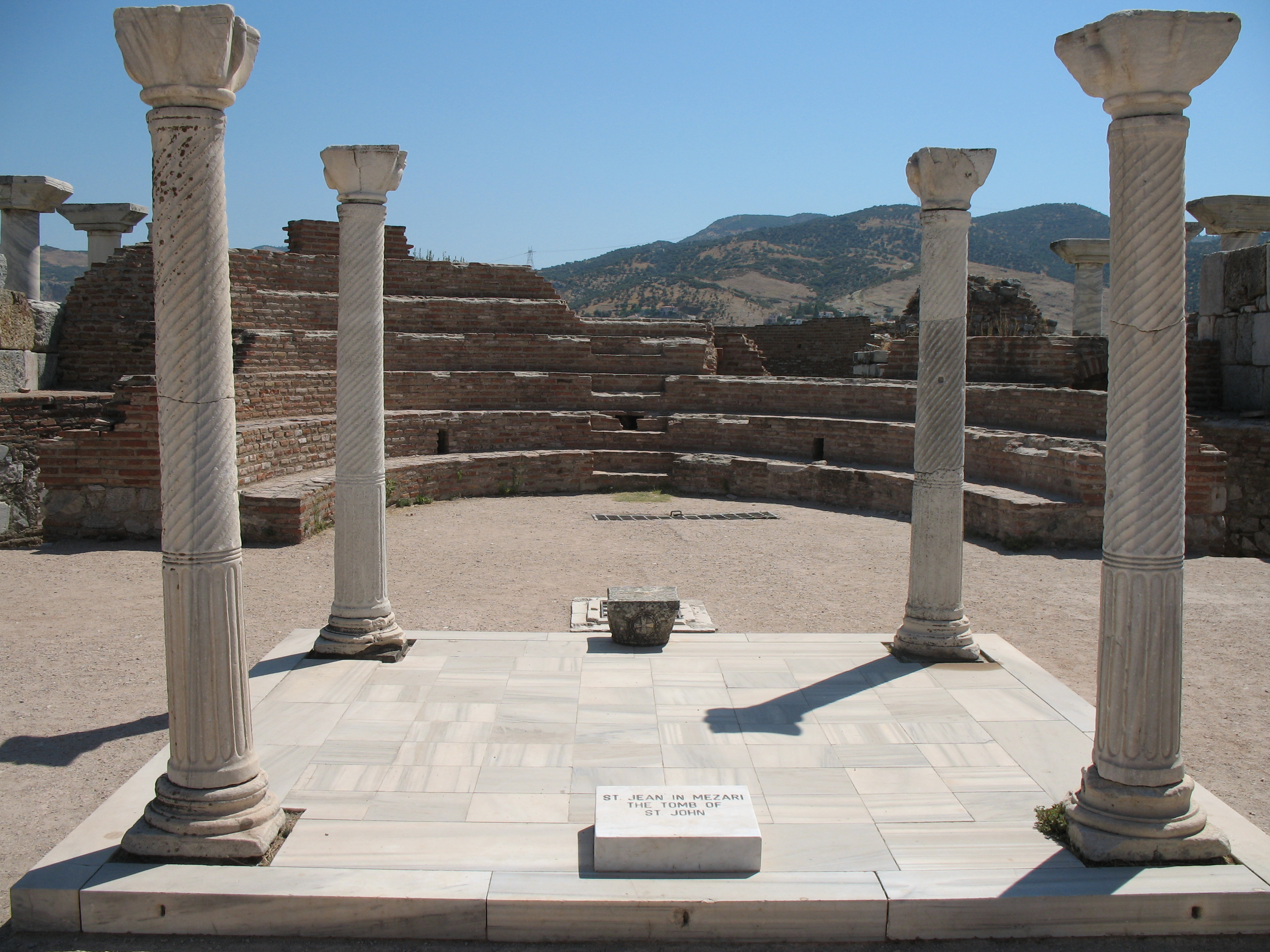
Tomb of Saint John the Apostle, Saint John's Basilica, Ephesus, Turkey

There is no information in the Bible concerning the duration of John's activity in Judea. According to tradition, John and the other Apostles remained some 12 years in this first field of labour. The persecution of Christians under Herod Agrippa I (r. 41–44 AD) led to the scattering of the Apostles through the Roman Empire's provinces.

A messianic community existed at Ephesus before Paul's first labors there (cf. "the brethren"), in addition to Priscilla and Aquila. The original community was under the leadership of Apollos (1 Corinthians 1:12). They were disciples of John the Baptist and were converted by Aquila and Priscilla. According to tradition, after the Assumption of Mary, John went to Ephesus. Irenaeus writes of "the church of Ephesus, founded by Paul, with John continuing with them until the times of Trajan." From Ephesus he wrote the three epistles attributed to him. John was banished by the Roman authorities to the Greek island of Patmos, where, according to tradition, he wrote the Book of Revelation. According to Tertullian (in The Prescription of Heretics) John was banished (presumably to Patmos) after being plunged into boiling oil in Rome and suffering nothing from it. It is said that all in the audience of Colosseum were converted to Christianity upon witnessing this miracle. This event would have occurred in the 1st century, during the reign of either Emperor Nero or Emperor Domitian, who were both known to have persecuted Christians.

When John was aged, he trained Polycarp who later became Bishop of Smyrna. This was important because Polycarp was able to carry John's message to future generations. Polycarp taught Irenaeus, passing on to him stories about John. Similarly, Ignatius of Antioch was a student of John. In Against Heresies, Irenaeus relates how Polycarp told a story of

John, the disciple of the Lord, going to bathe at Ephesus, and perceiving Cerinthus within, rushed out of the bath-house without bathing, exclaiming, "Let us fly, lest even the bath-house fall down, because Cerinthus, the enemy of the truth, is within."

It is traditionally believed that John was the youngest of the apostles and survived all of them. He is said to have lived to old age, dying of natural causes at Ephesus sometime after AD 98, during the reign of Trajan, thus becoming the only apostle who did not die as a martyr.

An alternative account of John's death, ascribed by later Christian writers to the early second-century bishop Papias of Hierapolis, claims that he was slain by the Jews. Most Johannine scholars doubt the reliability of its ascription to Papias, but a minority, including B.W. Bacon, Martin Hengel and Henry Barclay Swete, maintain that these references to Papias are credible. Theodor Zahn argues that this reference is actually to John the Baptist.

John's tomb is thought to be located in the former Basilica of St. John at Selçuk, a small town in the vicinity of Ephesus. John, along with Virgin Mary and Saint Joseph, belongs among a few saints who left no bodily relics as the opening of his tomb during Constantine the Great's reign yielded no bones. This fact gave rise to the belief that his body was assumed into heaven.

However, other beliefs emerged to the effect that John did not die at all but rather remained sleeping in his tomb, or at least that this miraculously appeared to be the case. For example, numerous medieval sources report that on May 8th every year at the site of his tomb at the Basilica of Saint John the Theologian in Ephesus, his breathing would stir and release a special dust, called manna, that, if consumed, was able to prevent and cure illness and, if thrown three times in water, could even calm storms at sea. The 14th century writer Catalan Muntaner wrote of the annual miracle that:

On Saint Stephen's day, every year, at the hour of vespers... manna like sand comes out of each hole [in the marble slab of the tomb] and rises a full palm high from the slab, as a jet of water rises up. And this manna issues out... and it lasts all night and then all Saint John's day until sunset. There is so much of this manna, by the time the sun has set and it has ceased to issue out, that, altogether, there are of it full three cuarteras of Barcelona. And this manna is marvelously good for many things; for instance he who drinks it when he feels fever coming on will never have fever again. Also, if a lady is in travail and cannot bring forth, if she drinks it with water or with wine, she will be delivered at once."

Similarly, in his Tractates on the Gospel of John, Augustine of Hippo reports that the ground above John's tomb in Ephesus was said to be in "sensible commotion" and to present "a kind of heaving appearance" due to the sleeper's breathing; later he also mentions reports of "bubbling up of the dust" also due to John's breathing. Whether with these descriptions Augustine meant to refer to the same phenomenon as the miraculous "manna" or something different is unclear. However, at least one story in the apocryphal Acts of John also supports the idea that there may have been a range of different legends about the tomb as it states that, upon uncovering John's grave, the earth was seen to be "springing up like a well" and that, notably, John's body was absent and only his sandals remained. In any case, the 19th century American author Herman Melville alludes to the image of the rising and falling earth in his novel Moby-Dick in chapter 111, comparing the "gently awful stirrings" of the ocean to "those fabled undulations of the Ephesian sod over the buried Evangelist St. John." According to Augustine and other sources, legends surrounding John's slumber likely derive from John 21 where Jesus says of the Disciple whom Jesus loved:

Jesus said to [Peter], "If it is my will that he remain until I come, what is that to you? You will follow me!" So the saying spread abroad among the brothers that this disciple was not to die; yet Jesus did not say to him that he was not to die, but, "If it is my will that he remain until I come, what is that to you?"

John is also associated with the pseudepigraphal apocryphal text of the Acts of John, which is traditionally viewed as written by John himself or his disciple, Leucius Charinus. It was widely circulated by the second century AD but deemed heretical at the Second Council of Nicaea (787 AD). Varying fragments survived in Greek and Latin within monastic libraries. It contains strong docetic themes, but is not considered in modern scholarship to be Gnostic.

== Liturgical commemoration ==
The feast day of Saint John in the Roman Catholic Church, which calls him "Saint John, Apostle and Evangelist", and in the Anglican Communion and Lutheran Calendars, which call him "Saint John the Apostle and Evangelist", is on 27 December. In the Tridentine calendar he was commemorated also on each of the following days up to and including 3 January, the Octave of the 27 December feast. This Octave was abolished by Pope Pius XII in 1955. The liturgical color is White. John, Apostle and Evangelist is remembered in the Church of England with a Festival on 27 December. In Roman Catholic tradition he is considered patron of Turkey, Asia Minor and Turkish people.

Until 1960, another feast day which appeared in the General Roman Calendar is that of "Saint John Before the Latin Gate" on 6 May, celebrating a tradition recounted by Jerome that St John was brought to Rome during the reign of the Emperor Domitian, and was thrown in a vat of boiling oil, from which he was miraculously preserved unharmed. A church (San Giovanni a Porta Latina) dedicated to him was built near the Latin gate of Rome, the traditional site of this event.

=== Eastern Orthodoxy ===
The Eastern Orthodox Church and those Eastern Catholic Churches which follow the Byzantine Rite commemorate the Apostle John on multiple days throughout the church year.

- February 15: Synaxis of Saint John the Theologian at Diaconissa.
- May 8: Apostle and Evangelist John the Theologian. On this date Christians used to draw forth from his grave fine ashes which were believed to be effective for healing the sick.
- June 30: Synaxis of the Twelve Apostles.
- July 10: Synaxis of Saint John the Theologian in the district of Beatus.
- August 2: Consecration of the Church of Saint John the Theologian near the Great Church.
- September 26: Repose of the Holy Apostle and Evangelist John the Theologian.

== Other views ==
=== Islamic view ===
The Quran also speaks of Jesus's disciples but does not mention their names, instead referring to them as "supporters for [the cause of] Allah". The Sunnah did not mention their names either. However, some Muslim scholars mentioned their names, likely relying on the resources of Christians, who are considered "People of the Book" in Islamic tradition. Muslim exegesis more or less agrees with the New Testament list and says that the disciples included Peter, Philip, Thomas, Bartholomew, Matthew, Andrew, James, Jude, John and Simon the Zealot. Notably, narrations of People of the Book (Christians and Jews) are not to be believed or disbelieved by Muslims as long as there is nothing that supports or denies them in Quran or Sunnah.

=== Druze view ===
Druze tradition honors several "mentors" and "prophets", and John the Apostle is honored as a prophet. In the Druze tradition and doctrine, Matthew the Apostle is respected for his contributions to spiritual knowledge and guidance. Druze doctrine teaches that Christianity is to be "esteemed and praised", as the Gospel writers are regarded as "carriers of wisdom".

=== Latter-day Saint (Mormon) view ===
The Church of Jesus Christ of Latter-day Saints (LDS Church) teaches that, "John is mentioned frequently in latter-day revelation (1 Ne. 14:18–27; 3 Ne. 28:6; Ether 4:16; D&C 7; 27:12; 61:14; 77; 88:141). For Latter-day Saints these passages confirm the biblical record of John and also provide insight into his greatness and the importance of the work the Lord has given him to do on the earth in New Testament times and in the last days. The latter-day scriptures clarify that John did not die but was allowed to remain on the earth as a ministering servant until the time of the Lord's Second Coming (John 21:20–23; 3 Ne. 28:6–7; D&C 7)". It also teaches that in 1829, along with the resurrected Peter and the resurrected James, John visited Joseph Smith and Oliver Cowdery and restored the priesthood authority with Apostolic succession to earth, though a few ex-Latter-Day Saints claim controversially that previous editions of Latter-day scripture contradict this claim of Priesthood authority and Apostolic succession. John, along with the Three Nephites, will live to see the Second Coming of Christ as translated beings.

The Church of Jesus Christ of Latter-Day Saints teaches that John the Apostle is the same person as John the Evangelist, John of Patmos, and the Beloved Disciple.

=== Freemasonry view ===
Although Freemasonry is not a religion, it takes as its patron saints St. John the Baptist and St. John the Evangelist. Therefore, the Feast of St. John the Evangelist is used in many jurisdictions as the start of the new masonic year.

== In art ==
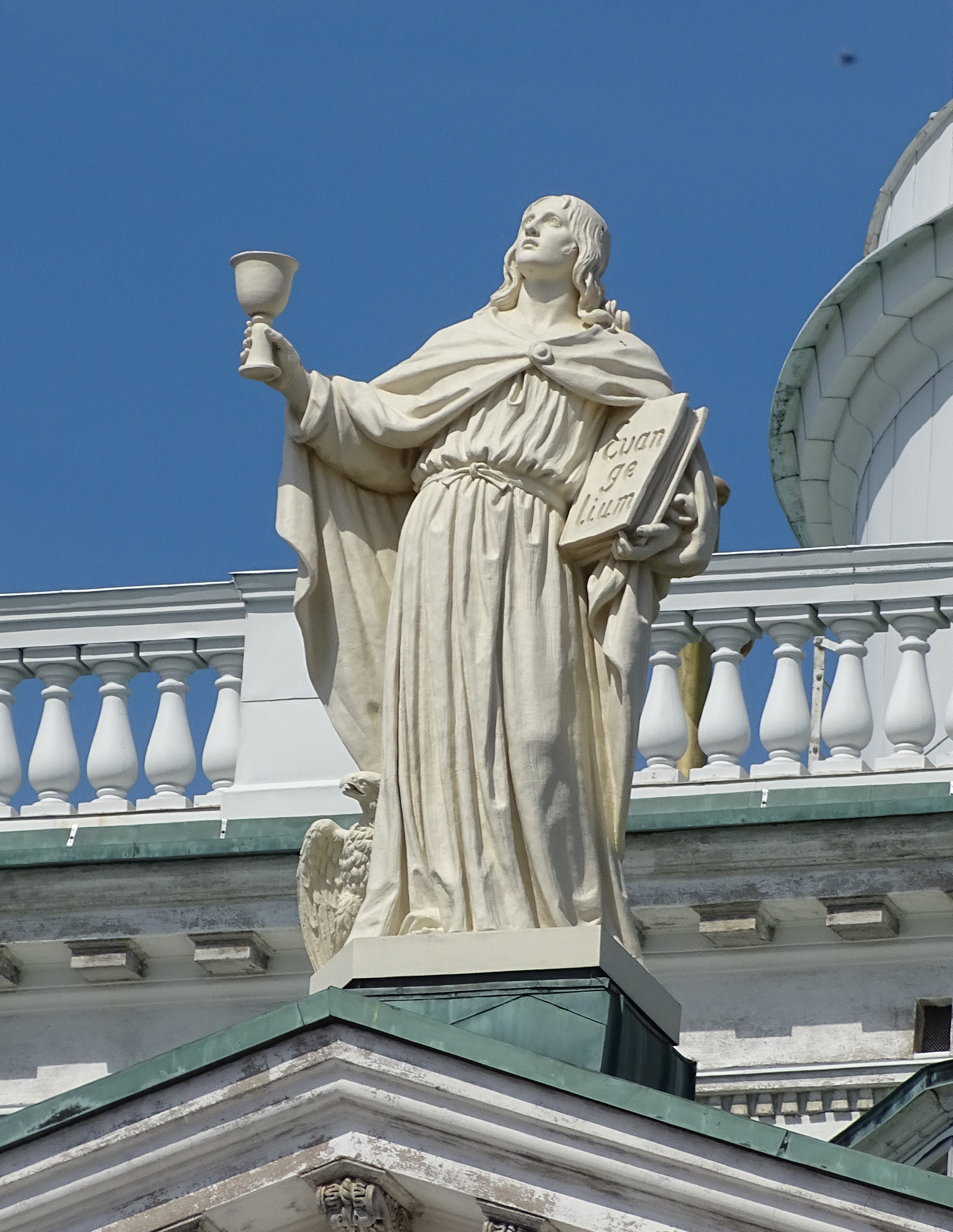
Statue of John the Evangelist by August Wredow on Helsinki Cathedral

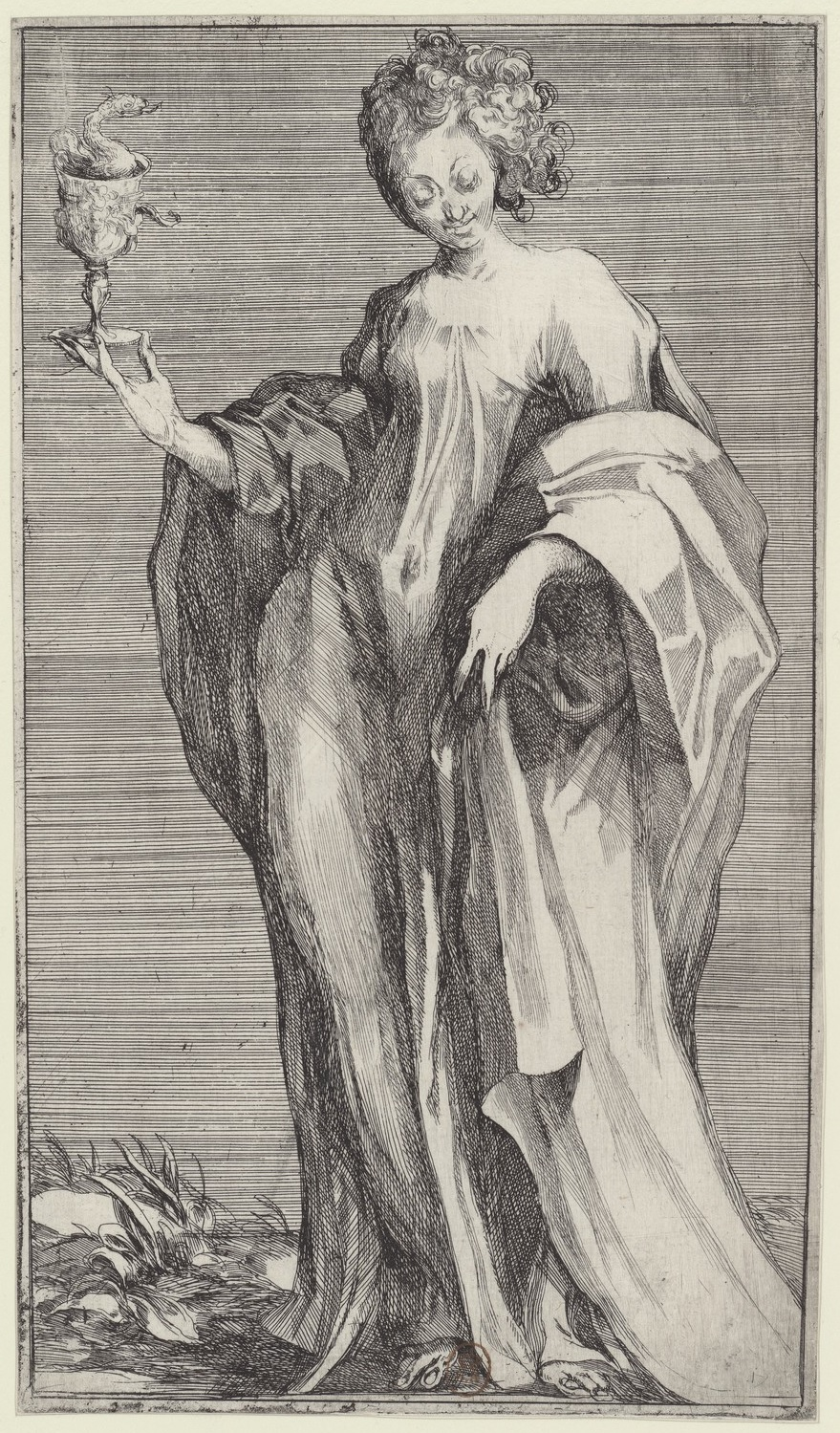
St. John the Apostle by Jacques Bellange, c. 1600

As he was traditionally identified with the beloved apostle, the evangelist, and the author of the Revelation and several Epistles, John played an extremely prominent role in art from the early Christian period onward. He is traditionally depicted in one of two distinct ways: either as an aged man with a white or gray beard, or alternatively as a beardless youth. The first way of depicting him was more common in Byzantine art, where it was possibly influenced by antique depictions of Socrates; the second was more common in the art of Medieval Western Europe, and can be dated back as far as 4th century Rome.

Legends from the Acts of John, an apocryphal text attributed to John, contributed much to Medieval iconography; it is the source of the idea that John became an apostle at a young age. One of John's familiar attributes is the chalice, often with a serpent emerging from it. This symbol is interpreted as a reference to a legend from the Acts of John, in which John was challenged to drink a cup of poison to demonstrate the power of his faith (the poison being symbolized by the serpent). Other common attributes include a book or scroll, in reference to the writings traditionally attributed to him, and an eagle, which is argued to symbolize the high-soaring, inspirational quality of these writings.

In Medieval and through to Renaissance works of painting, sculpture and literature, Saint John is often presented in an androgynous or feminized manner. Historians have related such portrayals to the circumstances of the believers for whom they were intended. For instance, John's feminine features are argued to have helped to make him more relatable to women. Likewise, Sarah McNamer argues that because of his status as an androgynous saint, John could function as an "image of a third or mixed gender" and "a crucial figure with whom to identify" for male believers who sought to cultivate an attitude of affective piety, a highly emotional style of devotion that, in late-medieval culture, was thought to be poorly compatible with masculinity. After the Middle Ages, feminizing portrayals of Saint John continued to be made; a case in point is an etching by Jacques Bellange, shown to the right, described by art critic Richard Dorment as depicting "a softly androgynous creature with a corona of frizzy hair, small breasts like a teenage girl, and the round belly of a mature woman."

In the realm of popular media, this latter phenomenon was brought to notice in Dan Brown's novel The Da Vinci Code (2003), where one of the book's characters suggests that the feminine-looking person to Jesus' right in Leonardo da Vinci's The Last Supper is actually Mary Magdalene rather than St. John.

== Gallery of art ==
John the Apostle

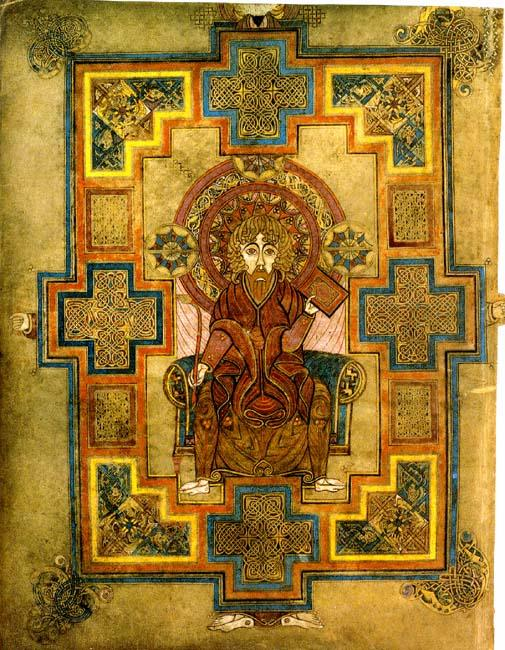
A portrait from the Book of Kells, c. 800

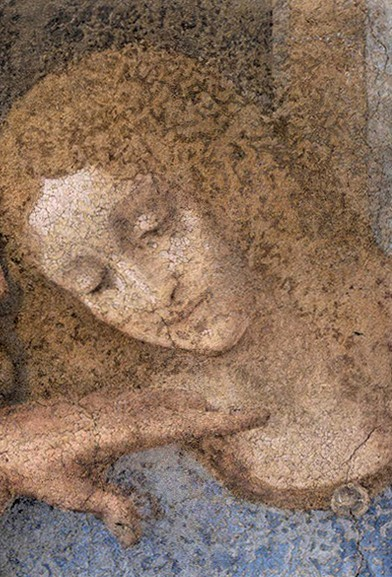
From the restored The Last Supper by Leonardo da Vinci,
c. 1400s

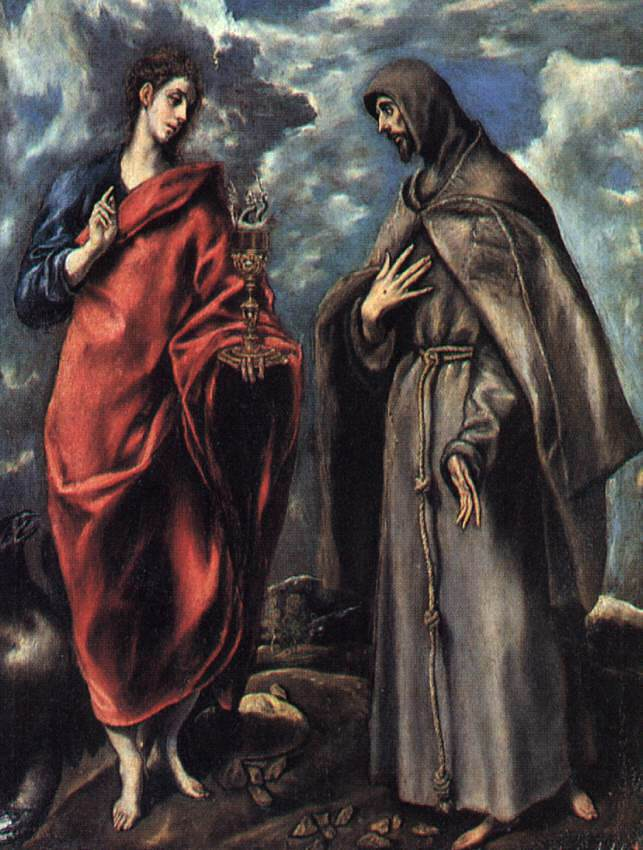
John the Apostle and St Francis by El Greco, c. 1600–1614

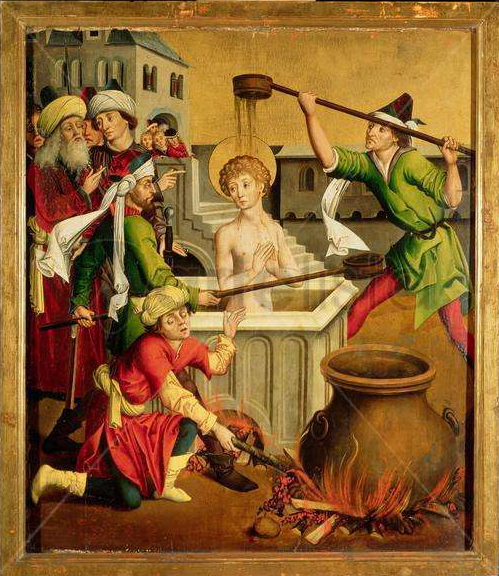
Martyrdom of Saint John the Evangelist by Master of the Winkler Epitaph
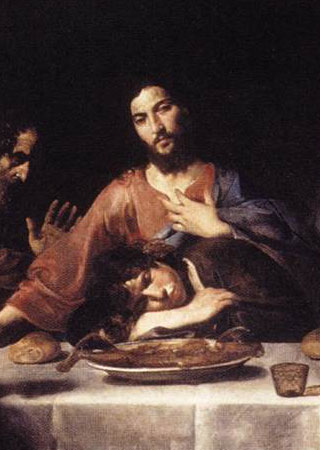
Valentin de Boulogne, John and Jesus

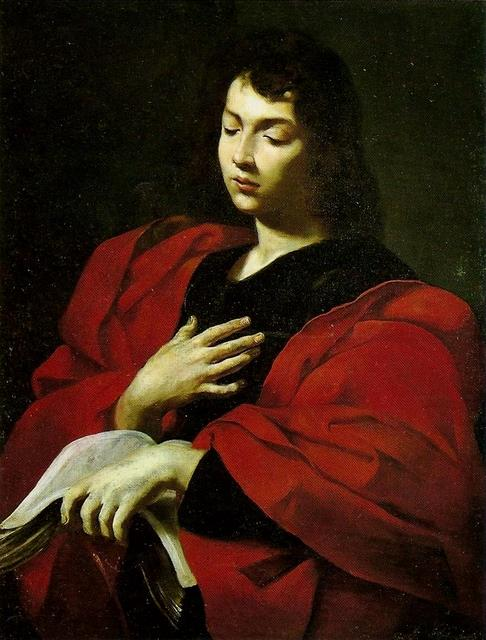
St. John the Evangelist in meditation by Simone Cantarini (1612–1648), Bologna

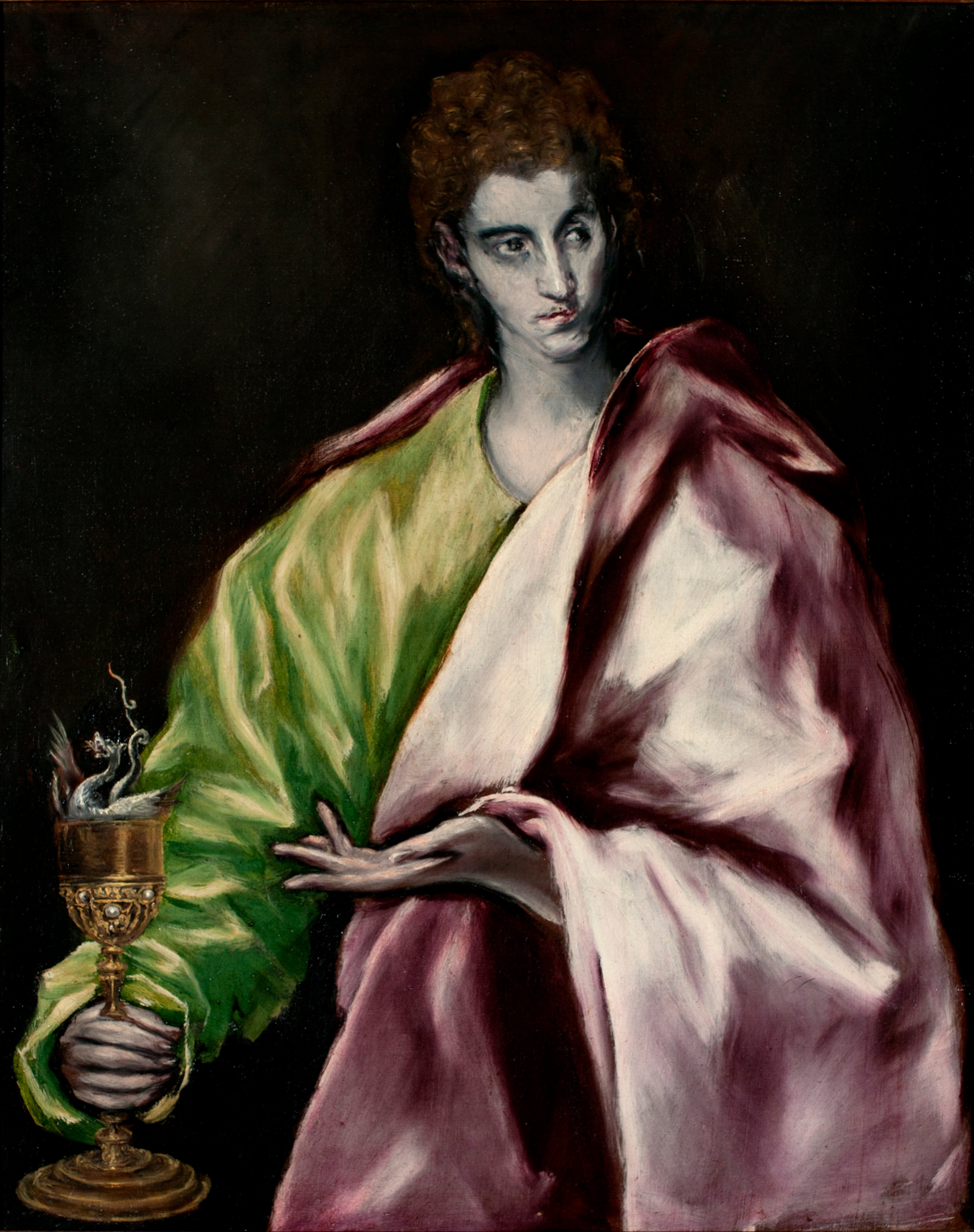
Saint John and the Poisoned Cup by El Greco, c. 1610–1614

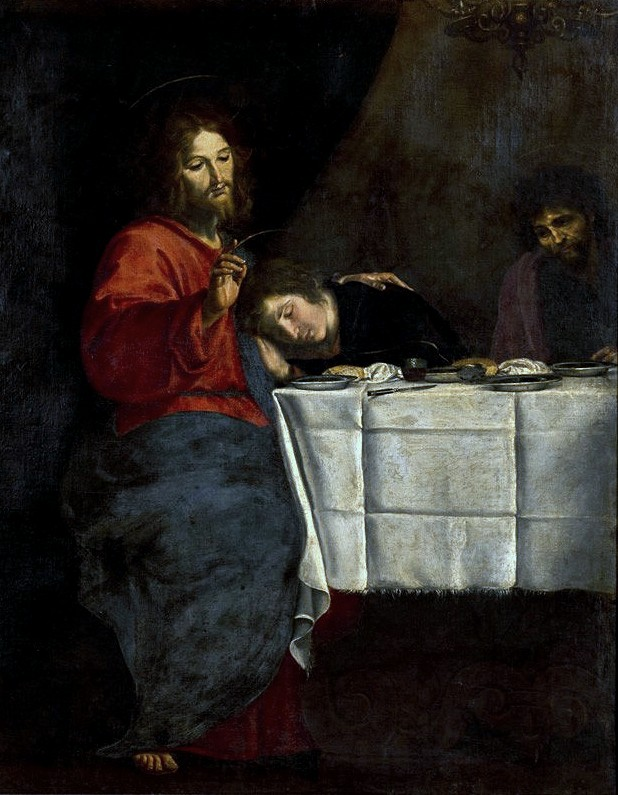
The Last Supper, anonymous painter

== See also ==
- Basilica of St. John
- Four Evangelists
- List of biblical figures identified in extra-biblical sources
- Names of John
- St. John the Evangelist on Patmos
- Vision of St. John on Patmos, 1520–1522 frescos by Antonio da Correggio
- Acts of John, a pseudepigraphal account of John's miracle work
- Saint John the Apostle, patron saint archive

== Sources ==
- Coogan, Michael; Brettler, Marc; Newsom, Carol; Perkins, Pheme (1 March 2018). The New Oxford Annotated Bible: New Revised Standard Version. Oxford University Press. p. 1380. ISBN 978-0-19-027605-8.
- Lindars, Barnabas; Edwards, Ruth; Court, John M. (2000). The Johannine Literature. A&C Black. ISBN 978-1-84127-081-4.
- Perkins, Pheme (1998). "The Synoptic Gospels and the Acts of the Apostles: Telling the Christian Story". In Barton, John (ed.). The Cambridge companion to biblical interpretation. Westminster John Knox Press. ISBN 978-0-521-48593-7.
- Perkins, Pheme; Coogan, Michael D. (2010). Brettler, Marc Z.; Newsom, Carol (eds.). The New Oxford Annotated Bible: New Revised Standard Version. Oxford University Press. p. 1380.
- Reddish, Mitchell (2011). An Introduction to The Gospels. Abingdon Press. ISBN 978-1426750083.
