= John Painter (theologian) =

Australian Christian theologian and New Testament scholar (born 1935)

John Painter, FAHA (born 22 September 1935 in Bellingen, New South Wales) is an Australian academic, New Testament scholar, and Christian theologian specializing in Johannine literature. He is currently Professor of Theology at Charles Sturt University in Canberra.

== Biography ==
Painter studied at Moore Theological College, the University of London, and the University of Durham. Before taking up his present position he had previously been Associate Professor at the University of Cape Town and La Trobe University. Painter was one of the translators of the Common English Bible.

Painter is married to Gillian and has two daughters. In 2001 he was awarded the Centenary Medal for "service to Australian society and the humanities in the study of religion."

== Works ==
=== Books ===
- — (1975). John, Witness and Theologian. London: S.P.C.K. ISBN 9780281028801. OCLC 2526112.
- — (1987). Theology as Hermeneutics: Rudolf Bultmann's Interpretation of the History of Jesus. Historic texts and interpreters in Biblical scholarship. Vol. 4. Sheffield: Almond. ISBN 9781850750505. OCLC 14258544.
- — (1991). The Quest for the Messiah: The History, Literature and Theology of the Johannine Community. Edinburgh: T & T Clark. ISBN 9780567095923. OCLC 26551401.
- — (1997). Mark's Gospel: worlds in conflict. London & New York: Routledge. ISBN 9780203978238. OCLC 252962217.
- — (1997). Just James: The Brother of Jesus in History and Tradition. Studies on personalities of the New Testament. Columbia, SC: University of South Carolina Press. ISBN 9781570031748. OCLC 37345616.
- — (2002). 1, 2, and 3 John. Sacra pagina. Vol. 18. Collegeville, MN: Liturgical Press. ISBN 9780814658123. OCLC 48429186.
- with DeSilva, David Arthur (2012). James and Jude. Paideia. Grand Rapids, MI: Baker Academic. ISBN 978-0-8010-3634-7. OCLC 775419936.

=== Articles ===
- — (1980). "Glimpses of the Johannine Community in the Farewell Discourses". Australian Biblical Review. 28: 21–38.
- — (1981). "A Note on the Hermeneutical Theology of Rudolf Bultmann". Australian Biblical Review. 29: 26–31.
- — (1981). "The Farewell Discourses and the History of Johannine Christianity". New Testament Studies. 27 (4): 525–543. doi:10.1017/S0028688500006895. S2CID 163088557.
- — (1983). "Christology and the Fourth Gospel: A Study of the Prologue". Australian Biblical Review. 31: 45–62.
- — (1985). ""The Origins of Demythologising" Revisited". Australian Biblical Review. 33: 2–14. (Discussing Johnson, Roger A. (1974). The Origins of Demythologizing: Philosophy and Historiography in the Theology of Rudolf Bultmann. Studies in the history of religions. Brill. ISBN 978-90-04-03903-2.)
- — (1986). "John 9 and the Interpretation of the Fourth Gospel". Journal for the Study of the New Testament. 9 (28): 31–61. doi:10.1177/0142064X8600902804. S2CID 170513116.
- — (1987). "Text and Context in John 5". Australian Biblical Review. 35: 28–34.
- — (1989). "Tradition and Interpretation in John 6". New Testament Studies. 35 (3): 421–450. doi:10.1017/S0028688500016866. S2CID 170892914.
- — (1993). "Theology, Eschatology and the Prologue of John". Scottish Journal of Theology. 46: 27–. doi:10.1017/S0036930600038291. S2CID 170866367.
- — (2000). "The Point of John's Christology: Christology, Conflict and Community in John". In Horrell, David G.; Tuckett, Christopher M. (eds.). Christology, controversy, and community: New Testament essays in honour of David R. Catchpole. Leiden Boston: Brill. pp. 231–252. doi:10.1163/9789047400417_013. ISBN 978-90-474-0041-7. OCLC 60257065.
- — (2001). "Who was James? : Footprints as a means of identification". In Chilton, B.; Neusner, J. (eds.). The Brother of Jesus: James the Just and His Mission. Presbyterian Publishing Corporation. p. 10-65. ISBN 978-0-664-22299-4.
- — (2002). "Earth made whole: John's reading of Genesis". In Painter, John; Culpepper, R. Alan; Segovia, Fernando F. (eds.). Word, Theology, and Community in John. St. Louis, MO: Chalice Press. pp. 65–84. ISBN 9780827242463. OCLC 50279890.
- — (2002). "Outward Decay and Inward Renewal: A Biblical Perspective on Aging and the Image of God". Journal of Religious Gerontology. 12 (3–4). Informa UK: 43–55. doi:10.1300/j078v12n03_04. ISSN 1050-2289. S2CID 159890268.
- — (2002). "Rereading Genesis in the Prologue of John?". In Aune, David Edward; Seland, Torrey; Ulrichsen, Jarl Henning (eds.). Neotestamentica et Philonica: Studies in honor of Peder Borgen. Leiden Boston: Brill. pp. 177–201. doi:10.1163/9789004268241_009. ISBN 978-90-04-26824-1. OCLC 883413103.
- — (2002). "Word, theology and community in John: Robert Kysar's contribution". In Painter, John; Culpepper, R. Alan; Segovia, Fernando F. (eds.). Word, Theology, and Community in John. St. Louis, MO: Chalice Press. pp. 1–18. ISBN 9780827242463. OCLC 50279890.
- — (2004). "James and Peter Models of Leadership and Mission". The Missions of James, Peter, and Paul. Brill. pp. 143–209. doi:10.1163/9789047414742_006. ISBN 978-90-474-1474-2.
- — (2004). Sacrifice and Atonement in the Gospel of John. Israel und seine Heilstraditionen im Johannesevangelium, 287–313.
- — (1 December 2004). "The Power of Words: Rhetoric in James and Paul". The Missions of James, Peter, and Paul. Brill. pp. 233–273. doi:10.1163/9789047414742_008. ISBN 978-90-474-1474-2.
- — (2006). "James as the First Catholic Epistle". Interpretation: A Journal of Bible and Theology. 60 (3). SAGE Publications: 245–259. doi:10.1177/002096430606000302. ISSN 0020-9643. S2CID 170262850.
- — (2007). The incarnation as a New Testament key to an Anglican public and contextual theology [Paper in: Public But Not Official: Anglican Contributions to Australian Life.]. St Mark's Review, (203), 61.
- — (2007). The signs of the messiah and the quest for eternal life. In What we have heard from the beginning: The past, present, and future of Johannine studies. (pp. 233–256). Baylor University Press.
- — (2008). 'The Light Shines in the Darkness' : Creation, Incarnation, and Resurrection in John. In Resurrection of Jesus in the Gospel of John (pp. 21–46). Mohr Siebeck.
- — (2009). A New Climate: The Theologian as Biblical Interpreter. In Embracing Grace: the theologian's task: essays in honour of Graeme Garrett (pp. 51–65). Barton Books.
- — (2009). The Johannine Epistles as Catholic Epistles. In Catholic Epistles and Apostolic Tradition (pp. 239–305). Baylor University Press.
- — (2010). An Anglican approach to public affairs in a global context. St Mark's Review, (213), 9-31.
- — (2010). "Johannine Literature: The Gospel and Letters of John". The Blackwell Companion to the New Testament. Oxford, UK: Wiley-Blackwell. pp. 344–372. doi:10.1002/9781444318937.ch20. ISBN 978-1-4443-1893-7.
- — (2012). The generosity of God in the world: Preaching from John, 1 John and James. St Mark's Review, (219), 35.
- — (2013). "Beloved Disciple". Dictionary of Jesus and the Gospels. IVP Academic. pp. 69–72.
- — (2013). "The Fourth Gospel and the Founder of Christianity: the place of Historical Tradition in the work of CH Dodd". Engaging with CH Dodd on the Gospel of John: Sixty Years of Tradition and Interpretation. Cambridge University Press. pp. 257–284.
- — (2013). "James of Jerusalem". Encyclopedia of Ancient History. Wiley-Blackwell. pp. 3566–3567.
- — (2014). "Identity in the Fourth Gospel". In Eklund, R.; Phelan, J.E. (eds.). Doing Theology for the Church: Essays in Honor of Klyne Snodgrass. Wipf & Stock. pp. 247–263. ISBN 978-1-4982-0535-1.
- — (2014). Mark and the Pauline mission. Two authors at the beginnings of Christianity, 527–553.
- — (2015). "What James Was, His More Famous Brother Was Also". Earliest Christianity within the Boundaries of Judaism. Brill. pp. 218–237. doi:10.1163/9789004310339_012. ISBN 978-90-04-31032-2.
- — (2018). The place of the Johannine canon within the New Testament canon. In The usefulness of scripture: Essays in honour of Robert W. Wall (pp. 178–202). Penn State University Press.
- — (2020). "The Quest for the Messiah: an Inquiry Concerning the Formation of the Johannine Christology". Johannine Christology. Brill. pp. 31–54. doi:10.1163/9789004435612_004. ISBN 978-90-04-42736-5. S2CID 234709811.
