= Mike Rakes =

Former President of Evangel University

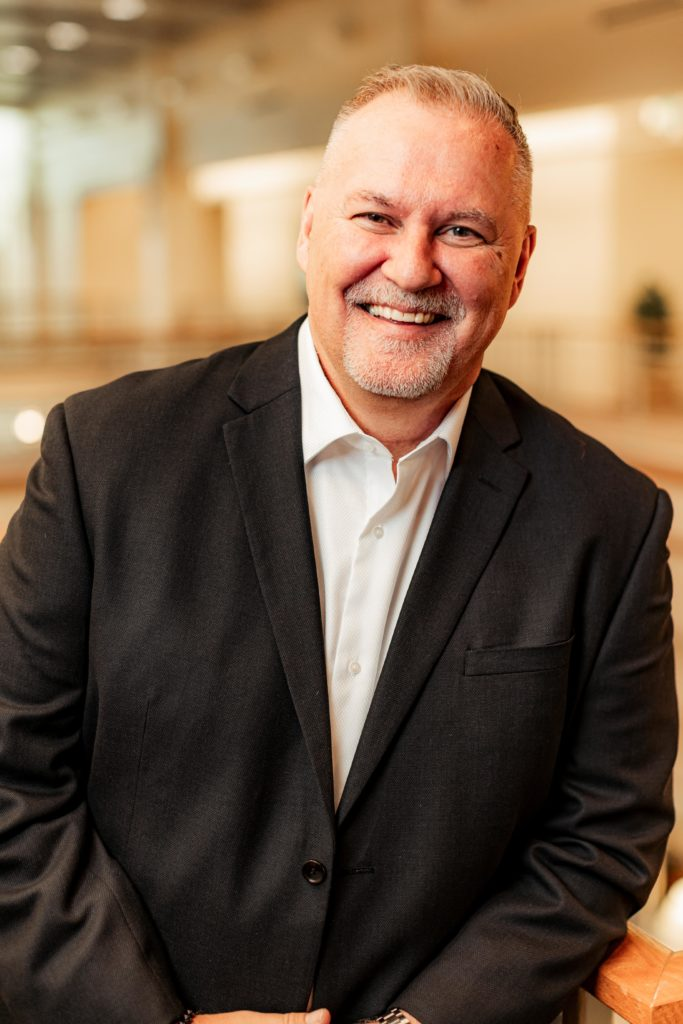

5th President of Evangel University
- In office July 2021 – July 2026
- Preceded by: George O. Wood (interim)
- Succeeded by: Michael Kolstad (Interim)

Personal details
- Education: Central Bible College (BA); Assemblies of God Theological Seminary (MA); Biola University (MDiv, DMin)

Mike Rakes is an American pastor, educator and academic administrator. He has held leadership roles in higher education institutions in the United States, including serving as president of Evangel University.

== Early life and education ==
Rakes graduated with a bachelor's degree in Pastoral Ministries from Central Bible College and a master's degree in Biblical Literature from the Assemblies of God Theological Seminary. He received a Master of Divinity in 1997 and a Doctor of Ministry degree in 2000 from Biola University.

== Career ==
Rakes started his career in higher education in 1993 as a faculty member at Southeastern University. He later served as the institution’s vice president for student development.

In addition to his academic roles, Rakes served as pastor at Winston-Salem First Assembly of God. During this period, he was involved in the establishment of Bridges Christian College in 2011 and served as its president until 2015.

Rakes also served on the board of trustees of Oral Roberts University beginning in 2013. He stepped down from the board after being named a finalist in the presidential search at Evangel University. In July 2021, he was appointed president of Evangel University, succeeding the interim leadership George O. Wood, following the retirement of the previous president. On July 30th, 2026, it was announced that Rakes tendered his resignation as president of Evangel University. Though no official reason was given in the announcement, the university had been experiencing significant financial issues.

== Publications ==
- 2015 Slings and Stones: How God Works in the Mind to Inspire Courage in the Heart ISBN 1-62998-032-3
- 2021 Surrendered & Unafraid: The Flourishing of Faith During Seasons of Suffering ISBN 1-949784-75-4
- 2025 The Black Start Leader: Reigniting Power and Purpose When Everything Goes Dark ISBN 979-8-31780-946-1
