= Thomas E. Trask =

- Education: North Central University
- Occupation: Pastor (Assemblies of God)
- Spouse: Shirley Trask
- Children: 4
- Religion: Pentecostal
- Ordained: 1958
- Writings: Back to the Altar; Back to the Word; The Battle,
- Congregations served: First Assembly of God (Saginaw, Michigan) and Brightmoor Tabernacle
- Offices held: General Superintendent, Assemblies of God, General Treasurer, Michigan District Superintendent
- Title: Brother, Reverend

Thomas E. Trask was the 11th General Superintendent of the Assemblies of God from 1993 to 2007.

== Early life and ministry ==
His parents, Waldo and Beatrice Trask, were Assemblies of God ministers. Waldo and Beatrice dedicated their lives to their religion becoming pioneer pastors and evangelists, holding services in 118 of Minnesota's 138 Assemblies of God churches. He began ministry in 1957 and was ordained in 1958. A graduate of North Central University in Minneapolis, Minnesota, He served as senior pastor at First Assembly of God (Saginaw, Michigan) and Brightmoor Tabernacle (Southfield, Michigan). He served the Michigan District of the Assemblies of God as District Youth and Sunday School Director, Assistant Superintendent and Superintendent. He and his congregations helped to create seven new churches. Trask was elected to serve as general treasurer of the Assemblies of God in 1989.

== General Superintendent ==
Trask was elected to serve as General Superintendent on November 15, 1993. He was elected to three four-year terms. As the chief executive officer of the Assemblies of God, the largest Pentecostal denomination in the world, he is a member of the denomination's Board of Administration and serves as chairman of the Executive Presbytery. During his tenure, the Assemblies of God grew significantly. The number of U.S. adherents increased by 25 percent from 2,271,718 in 1993 to 2,836,174 adherents in 2006, and the worldwide constituency of the Assemblies of God increased by 124 percent from 25,448,373 in 1993 to 57,023,562 in 2006.

Trask is the third longest-serving general superintendent. Trask is also the first general superintendent to resign before finishing out his term. Trask served on the boards of the Assemblies of God Theological Seminary, Central Bible College and Evangel University. He also served on several boards and committees for the denomination, including the General Presbytery. He was the chairman of the World Assemblies of God Fellowship, the Assemblies of God Financial Services Group and Global University. He was a member of the board of administration of the National Association of Evangelicals and the board of directors of the National Religious Broadcasters.
