= Craig S. Keener =

American Protestant theologian, Biblical scholar and professor (born 1960)

- Born: July 4, 1960 (age 66)
- Title: F. M. and Ada Thompson Professor of New Testament at Asbury Theological Seminary
- Spouse: Médine Moussounga Keener

Academic background
- Education: Central Bible College (BA); Assemblies of God Theological Seminary (MA, MDiv); Duke University (PhD)
- Thesis: (1991)
- Doctoral advisor: D. Moody Smith

Academic work
- Institutions: Palmer Theological Seminary; Asbury Theological Seminary
- Notable works: Acts: An Exegetical Commentary (in four volumes) (2012-2015) Mark: A Critical and Exegetical Commentary (International Critical Commentary) (in seven volumes) (2026-2027)
- Website: https://www.craigkeener.com/

Craig S. Keener (born July 4, 1960) is an American Bapticostal theologian, Biblical scholar and professor of the New Testament at Asbury Theological Seminary.

== Biography ==
=== Early life and education ===
Keener was born on 4 July 1960. He studied at Central Bible College (now part of Evangel University) and graduated with a Bachelor of Arts in 1982. He then studied theology at Assemblies of God Theological Seminary (now also part of Evangel University), earning a Master's degree in 1982 and a Master of Divinity in 1987. He earned his Ph.D. in 1991 from Duke University in New Testament and Christian origins.

=== Career ===
In 1991, he was ordained as a minister by the National Baptist Convention, USA. In 2001 he became an associate pastor at Enon Tabernacle Baptist Church in Philadelphia until 2011.

Keener became a professor at Hood Theological Seminary, then professor of New Testament at Palmer Theological Seminary at Eastern University for nearly 15 years. Since 2011, Keener has been (F. M. and Ada Thompson) professor of the New Testament at Asbury Theological Seminary in Wilmore, Kentucky. Keener has taught in various countries, especially countries in Africa.

From 2014 to 2019, Keener was the editor of the Bulletin for Biblical Research. He has authored a number of commentaries on New Testament books as well as books and articles. His popular IVP Bible Background Commentary: New Testament (1993) has sold over half a million copies.

In 2020, he served as the president of the Evangelical Theological Society.

=== Scholarly expertise and views ===
Keener's expertise lies in New Testament background, the book of Acts, Jesus, miracles, the Gospels and ethnic/racial reconciliation.

Bruce Chilton lauded Keener's 2009 book The Historical Jesus of the Gospels, writing that it "marks a notable moment in the critical study of Jesus." He based this claim on the fact that Keener uses the study of Jesus' Jewish environment to argue for the authenticity of the Gospels. Keener has an Arminian theological standpoint on soteriology, supporting conditional preservation of the believer. Keener holds egalitarian and continuationist views.

Keener's book Christobiography: Memory, History, and the Reliability of the Gospels argues that the Gospels should be considered ancient biography and analyzes their historical value in that light. Keener also interacts with the oral traditions behind the Gospels and memory theory. His work has been endorsed by Richard Bauckham, Markus Bockmuehl, James Charlesworth, and David Aune, among others. Richard Burridge, who was one of the key scholars who initially demonstrated that the Gospels were ancient biography, praised Keener's volume as well.

=== Awards ===
The NIV Cultural Backgrounds Study Bible, for which Keener authored most of the New Testament notes, won Bible of the Year in the 2017 Christian Book Awards, and also won Book of the Year in the Religion: Christianity category of the International Book Awards.

== Personal life ==
He is married to Médine Moussounga Keener, who holds a Ph.D. from University of Paris 7. He and his wife have two children, David and Keren.

== Works ==
=== Books ===
- Keener, Craig S. (1991). And Marries Another: divorce and remarriage in the teaching of the New Testament. Peabody, MA: Hendrickson. ISBN 978-0-943-57546-9. OCLC 24787129.
- ——— (1992). Paul, Women & Wives. Peabody, MA: Hendrickson. ISBN 978-0-943-57596-4. OCLC 26363900.
- ——— (1994). The IVP Bible Background Commentary: New Testament. Downers Grove, IL: InterVarsity Press. ISBN 978-0-830-81405-3. OCLC 29313370.
- ——— (1997). The Spirit in the Gospels and Acts: divine purity and power. Peabody, MA: Hendrickson. ISBN 9781565631694. OCLC 1124144441. - based on the author's Ph.D. thesis
- ——— (1997). Matthew. IVP New Testament commentary series. Vol. 1. Downers Grove, IL: InterVarsity Press. ISBN 978-0-830-81801-3. OCLC 35723512.
- ——— (1999). A Commentary on the Gospel of Matthew. Grand Rapids, MI: Eerdmans. ISBN 978-0-802-83821-6. OCLC 40473792.
- ——— (2000). Revelation. NIV Application Commentary. Grand Rapids, MI: Zondervan. ISBN 978-0-3102-3192-9. OCLC 41924712.
- ——— (2001). Gift & Giver: The Holy Spirit for Today. Grand Rapids, MI: Baker Academic. ISBN 978-0-8010-2266-1. OCLC 45162181.
- ——— (2003). The Gospel of John: A Commentary (2 vols.). Peabody, MA: Hendrickson. ISBN 978-1-5656-3378-0. OCLC 52750146.
- ——— (2006). 1-2 Corinthians. New Cambridge Bible Commentary. Cambridge: Cambridge University Press. ISBN 978-0-521-83462-9. OCLC 56840215.
- ——— (2009). The Historical Jesus of the Gospels. Grand Rapids, MI: Eerdmans. ISBN 978-0-802-86292-1. OCLC 368046328.
- ——— (2009). Romans. New Covenant Commentary Series. Cascade Books. ISBN 978-1-6060-8156-3. OCLC 437054246.
- ——— (2011). Miracles: The Credibility of the New Testament Accounts. Grand Rapids, MI: Baker Academic. ISBN 978-0--801-03952-2. OCLC 699760418.
- ——— (2012). Acts: An Exegetical Commentary, vol. 1: Introduction and 1:1-2:47. Grand Rapids, MI: Baker Academic. ISBN 978-0-8010-4836-4. OCLC 844024128.
- ——— (2013). Acts: An Exegetical Commentary, vol. 2: 3:1-14:28. Grand Rapids, MI: Baker Academic. ISBN 978-0-8010-4837-1. OCLC 864430825.
- ——— (2013). The Bible in Its Context. Mountlake Terrace, WA: Action International Ministries (ACTION). ISBN 978-1-942114-00-0.
- ——— (2014). Acts: An Exegetical Commentary, vol. 3: 15:1-23:35. Grand Rapids, MI: Baker Academic. ISBN 978-0-8010-4838-8. OCLC 861208882.
- ——— (2015). Acts: An Exegetical Commentary, vol. 4: 24:1-28:31. Grand Rapids, MI: Baker Academic. ISBN 978-0-8010-4839-5. OCLC 903675668.
- ——— (2016). The Mind of the Spirit: Paul's Approach to Transformed Thinking. Grand Rapids, MI: Baker Academic. ISBN 978-0801-09776-8.
- ——— (2016). Spirit Hermeneutics: Reading Scripture in Light of Pentecost. Grand Rapids, MI: Eerdmans. ISBN 978-0802-87439-9.
- ——— (2018). Galatians. New Cambridge Bible Commentary. Cambridge: Cambridge University Press. ISBN 978-1108-44557-3.
- ——— (2018). Galatians: A Commentary. Grand Rapids, MI: Baker Academic. ISBN 978-154-096007-8.
- ——— (2019). Christobiography: Memories, History, and the Reliability of the Gospels. Grand Rapids, MI: Eerdmans. ISBN 9780802876751.
- ———; Brown, Michael L. (2019). Not Afraid of the Antichrist. Grand Rapids, MI: Chosen Books. ISBN 978-0800-79916-8.
- ——— (2019). John: Volume 2A (Zondervan Illustrated Bible Backgrounds Commentary). Zondervan Academic. ISBN 978-0310528852.
- ——— (2020). Acts (New Cambridge Bible Commentary). Cambridge University Press. ISBN 978-1108468688.
- ——— (2021). 1 Peter: A Commentary (A Comprehensive Cultural & Contextual Bible Commentary on 1 Peter). Baker Academic. ISBN 978-1540962867.
- ——— (2026). Mark's Gospel: Critical Excursuses. T&T Clark. ISBN 9780567728838.
- ——— (2026). Mark 1-4: A Critical and Exegetical Commentary (International Critical Commentary, 1). T&T Clark. ISBN 978-0567668356.
- ——— (2026). Mark 5-9: A Critical and Exegetical Commentary (International Critical Commentary). T&T Clark. ISBN 978-0567668400.
- ——— (2026). The Gospels Are Reliable History: Eyewitnesses to the Ministry of Jesus. Eerdmans. ISBN 978-0802886132.
- ——— (2026). Mark 10-13: A Critical and Exegetical Commentary. T&T Clark. ISBN 9780567712875.
- ——— (2027). Mark 14-16: A Critical and Exegetical Commentary. T&T Clark. ISBN 9780567712912.
- ——— (2027). Mark, a Critical Introduction. T&T Clark. ISBN 9780567727916.
- ——— (2027). A Bibliography of Works Cited on Mark's Gospel. T&T Clark. ISBN 9780567726094.

=== Articles and chapters ===
(n.b. partial list)

- ——— (1987). "Matthew 5:22 and the Heavenly Court". Expository Times. 99 (2): 46.
- ——— (2000). "Marriage". In Evans, Craig A.; Porter, Stanley E. (eds.). Dictionary of New Testament Background. Downers Grove, IL: Intervarsity Press. pp. 680-93. ISBN 9780830817801.
- ——— (2003). "Some New Testament Invitations to Ethnic Reconciliation". Evangelical Quarterly. 75 (3): 195–213. doi:10.1163/27725472-07503001.
- ——— (2003). "Spirit, Holy Spirit, Advocate, Breath, Wind". In Evans, Craig A.; Gowan, Donald E. (eds.). Westminster Theological Wordbook of the Bible. Louisville, KY: Westminster/John Knox Press. pp. 484–96.
- ——— (2005). "'Brood of Vipers' (Mt. 3.7; 12.34; 23.33)". Journal for the Study of the New Testament. 28 (1): 3–11. doi:10.1177/0142064X05057771. S2CID 163128593.
- ——— (2006). "Paul's 'Friends' the Asiarchs (Acts 19.31)". Journal of Greco-Roman Christianity and Judaism. 3: 134–41.
- ——— (2008). "Novel's 'Exotic' Places and Luke's African Official (Acts 8:27)". Andrews University Seminary Studies. 46 (1): 5–20.
- ——— (2008). "Between Asia and Europe: Postcolonial Mission in Acts 16:8-10". Asian Journal of Pentecostal Studies. 11 (1–2): 3–14.
- ——— (2008). "Some Rhetorical Techniques in Acts 24:2-21". In Porter, Stanley E. (ed.). Paul's World. Leiden: E. J. Brill. pp. 221-51. ISBN 9789004162723.
- ——— (2009). "Fever and Dysentery in Acts 28:8 and Ancient Medicine". Bulletin for Biblical Research. 19 (3): 393–402. doi:10.2307/26424217. JSTOR 26424217. S2CID 248445562.
- ——— (2009). "We Beheld his Glory (Jn 1:14)". In Anderson, Paul N.; Just, Felix; Thatcher, Tom (eds.). Aspects of Historicity in the Fourth Gospel Vol. 2 of John, Jesus and History. SBL Early Christianity and Its Literature 2. Atlanta, GA: Society of Biblical Literature. pp. 15–25.
- ——— (2010). "The Nativity Cave and Gentile Myths". Journal of Greco-Roman Christianity and Judaism. 7: 59–67.
- ——— (2010). "The Pillars and the Right Hand of Fellowship in Galatians 2:9". Journal of Greco-Roman Christianity and Judaism. 7: 51–58.
- ——— (2010). "Spirit Possession as a Cross-Cultural Experience". Bulletin for Biblical Research. 20 (2): 215–36. doi:10.2307/26424297. JSTOR 26424297. S2CID 40571982.
- ——— (2011). "Paul and the Corinthian Believers". In Westerholm, Stephen (ed.). The Blackwell Companion to Paul. Malden, MA: Blackwell. pp. 46–62.
- ——— (2012). "Paul and Sedition: Pauline Apologetic in Acts". Bulletin for Biblical Research. 22 (2): 201–24. doi:10.2307/26424753. JSTOR 26424753. S2CID 248459393.
- ——— (2013). "John, Gospel of". In Green, Joel B.; Brown, Jeannine K.; Perrin, Nicholas (eds.). Dictionary of Jesus and the Gospels (2nd ed.). Downers Grove, IL: Intervarsity Press. pp. 419–36.
- ——— (2013). "Youthful Vigor and the Maturity of Age: Peter and the Beloved Disciple in John 20—21". In Chrupcala, L. Daniel (ed.). John: Essays on the Fourth Gospel in Honour of Frédéric Manns. Milan: Rdizioni Terra Santa. pp. 559–75.
- ——— (2014). "Luke-Acts and the Historical Jesus". In Charlesworth, James; Rhea, Brian; Pokorny, Petr (eds.). Jesus Research: New Methodologies and Perceptions. The Second Princeton-Prague Symposium on Jesus Research. Grand Rapids, MI: Eerdmans. pp. 600–623.
- ——— (2014). "Miracle Reports: Perspectives, Analogies, Explanations". In Charlesworth, James; Rhea, Brian (eds.). Hermeneutik der frühchristlichen Wundererzählungen: Historiche, literarische und rezeptionsästhetische Aspekte. WUNT. Vol. 339. Tübingen: Mohr Siebeck. pp. 53–65.
- ——— (2015). "Miracles". In Balentine, Samuel E. (ed.). The Oxford Encyclopedia of Bible and Theology. Vol. 2. New York: Oxford University Press. pp. 101–7.
- ——— (2016). "Paul's Positive Madness in Acts 26:24-25". In Lang, Manfred; Verheyden, Joseph (eds.). Goldene Anfänge und Aufbrüche: Johann Jakob Wettstein und die Apostelgeschichte. Arbeiten zur Bibel und Ihrer Geschichte. Leipzig: Evangelische Verlagsanstalt. pp. 311–20.
- ——— (2016). "Transformed Thinking in Paul's Letters". Doon Theological Journal. 13: 5–24.
- ——— (2016). "'What Is Truth?': Pilate's Perspective on Jesus in John 18:33-38". In Anderson, Paul N.; Just, Felix; Thatcher, Tom (eds.). Glimpses of Jesus through the Johannine Lens, Vol. 3 of John, Jesus and History. SBL Early Christianity and Its Literature 18. Atlanta, GA: Scholars Press. pp. 77–94.
- ——— (2017). "Rhetoric". In Thatcher, Tom; Keith, Chris; Person, Raymond F. Jr.; Stern, Elsie R.; Odor, Judith (eds.). The Dictionary of the Bible and Ancient Media. New York: T&T Clark. pp. 337–41.
- ——— (2019). "Historical Tradition in the Fourth Gospel's Depiction of the Baptist". In Charlesworth, James; Pruszinski, Jolyon G. R. (eds.). Jesus Research: The Gospel of John in Historical Inquiry (Jewish and Christian Texts). T&T Clark. pp. 155–167. ISBN 978-0567681386.
- ——— (2025). "First-Person Claims in Some Ancient Historians and Acts". In Tabb, Brian; Gurtner, Daniel (eds.). Engaging the First Christian Historian: Essays on Luke-Acts. T&T Clark. pp. 71–82. ISBN 9780567713421.
- ——— (2026). "Spiritual Proselytes or "Righteous Gentiles" in Acts 15?". In Oliver, Isaac; McWhirter, Jocelyn; Scott, Joshua (eds.). Luke and Acts with(in) Second Temple Judaism. De Gruyter. pp. 77–94. ISBN 9783110784909.

== Notes and references ==
=== Sources ===
- AS (2020). "Craig S. Keener's Asbury faculty page". Asbury Theological Seminary.
- Chilton, Bruce (2011). "The Historical Jesus of the Gospels". Catholic Biblical Quarterly. 73: 393–394.
- Doriani, Daniel M. (2009). "A Redemptive-Historical Model". Four Views on Moving beyond the Bible to Theology. Zondervan Academic.
- ETS (2021). "Craig S. Keener, Past President 2020". The Evangelical Theological Society.
- Hauerwas, Stanley; Wells, Samuel (2011). The Blackwell Companion to Christian Ethics. John Wiley & Sons.
- Hardman, Randall (2012). "Craig Keener. Miracles: The Credibility of the New Testament Accounts". American Theological Inquiry. 5 (2).
- Keener, Craig S. (2024). "About Craig Keener". Bible Background.
- LC (2019). "Keener, Craig S., 1960-". Library of Congress.
- Marberry, Thomas (1998). ""Matthew" in the IVP New Testament Commentary Series By Craig S. Keener". Contact: Official Publication of the National Association of Free Will Baptists. Vol. 45. The Association.
- Oliverio, L. William (2022). Pentecostal Hermeneutics in the Late Modern World: Essays on the Condition of Our Interpretation. Eugene, OR: Wipf and Stock Publishers.
- Stovell, Beth M. (2020). "A Short History of IBR". Institute for Biblical Research.
- TBT (1991). "White scholar to join black church". Tampa Bay Times. Times Publishing Company.
- Wilkin, Bob (2019). "Leading Evangelical Craig Keener Says Arminians and Calvinists Question Once-Saved-Always-Saved As It Is Commonly Taught". Grace Evangelical Society.
