= George O. Wood =

American Pentecostal minister (1941–2022)

- General Superintendent
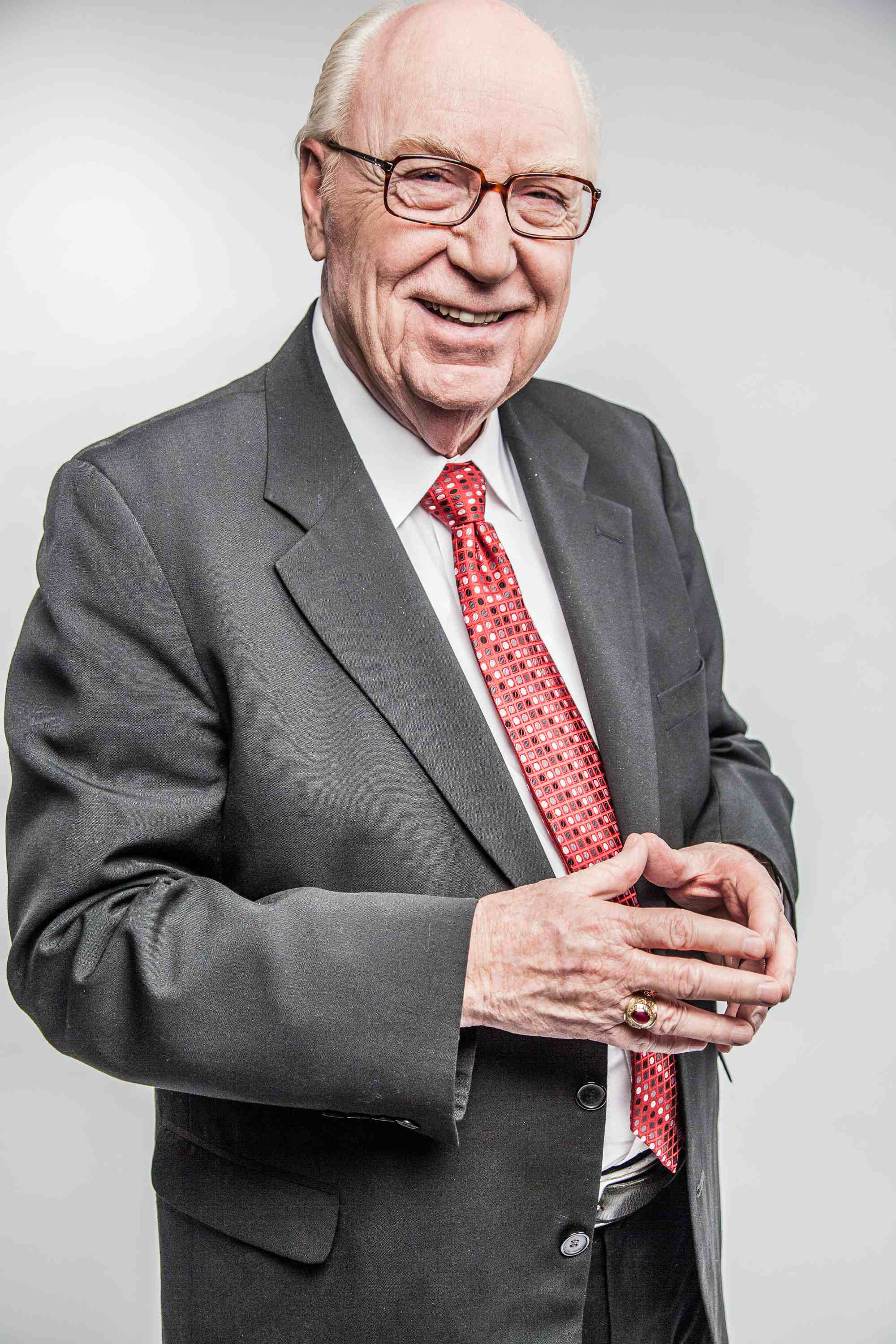
- Wood in 2013
- Church: Newport-Mesa Christian Center
- Elected: 2007
- In office: 2007–2017
- Predecessor: Thomas E. Trask
- Successor: Doug E. Clay

Orders
- Ordination: 1967 by General Council of the Assemblies of God in the United States of America, Southern Missouri District

Personal details
- Born: September 1, 1941 China
- Died: January 12, 2022 (aged 80) Springfield, Missouri, US
- Spouse: Jewel Wood
- Children: 2
- Education: Evangel University (B.A.), Fuller Seminary (P.Th.D.), Western State University (J.D.)

George O. Wood (September 1, 1941 – January 12, 2022) was an American Pentecostal minister. He served in executive leadership of the U.S. Assemblies of God for 24 years in the roles of general secretary and general superintendent. From 2007 until 2017, he served as General Superintendent of the General Council of the Assemblies of God in the United States of America (AG) and had been the Chairman of the World Assemblies of God Fellowship, the largest Pentecostal denomination in the world, since 2008. He previously served as General Secretary of the AG from 1993 to 2007.

Wood served as Director of Spiritual Life and Student Life at Evangel University from 1965 to 1971, Pastor of Newport Mesa Christian Center, now Mesa Church in Costa Mesa, California, for 17 years; and Assistant Superintendent of the Southern California Ministry Network from 1988 to 1993. He held doctorates in both theology and law.

== Personal life and death ==
Wood was born to missionaries in China on September 1, 1941. He received a B.A. from Evangel University, a J.D. from Western State University College of Law in Fullerton, California, and a Doctor of Pastoral Theology degree (P.Th.D.) from Fuller Theological Seminary in Pasadena, California. He died from cancer on January 12, 2022, at the age of 80.

== Ministry ==
For 17 years, he pastored Newport Mesa Christian Center in Costa Mesa, California. From 1965 until 1971, he was director of Spiritual Life and Student Life at Evangel University in Springfield, Missouri.

In 1988 until 1993, he was the Assistant Superintendent of the Southern California District of the Assemblies of God (1988–93). From 1993 until 2007, he served as General Secretary of the General Council of the Assemblies of God in the United States of America (AG). From 2007 until 2017, he served as General Superintendent of the AG. In 2008, he became the Chairman of the World Assemblies of God Fellowship.

== Publications ==
- 1984 The Successful Life ISBN 0-930756-82-7
- 1986 Living Fully ISBN 0-932305-23-7
- 1998 A Psalm in Your Heart: Psalms 1-75 ISBN 0-88243-685-6
- 1999 A Psalm In Your Heart, Volume 2: Psalms 76-150 ISBN 0-88243-785-2
- 2008 Trusting God ISBN 188068909X
- 2009 Living in the Spirit
- 2009 Jesus and You ISBN 1880689154
- 2012 Acts of the Holy Spirit ISBN 1603820248
