= Book of Signs =

Gospel of John presents 7 miracles of Jesus

In Christian scholarship, the Book of Signs is a name commonly given to the first main section of the Gospel of John, from 1:19 to the end of Chapter 12. It follows the Hymn to the Word and precedes the Book of Glory. It is named for seven notable events, often called "signs" or "miracles", that it records. The division of the gospel in this way was popularized by the American Catholic scholar Raymond E. Brown.

== Location in text ==
There is a widespread scholarly view that the Gospel of John can be broken into four parts: a prologue (John 1:1–18), the Book of Signs (1:19 to 12:50), the Book of Glory (or Exaltation; 13:1 to 20:31) and an epilogue (chapter 21). The division of the gospel in this way was popularized by the American Catholic scholar Raymond E. Brown.

³⁰Therefore many other signs Jesus also performed in the presence of the disciples, which are not written in this book; ³¹but these have been written so that you may believe that Jesus is the Christ, the Son of God; and that believing you may have life in His name.

— John xx

It is this indication by the author of the gospel that the signs are selected, which leads to the examination of them as a sequence of seven.

== Seven Signs ==
The seven signs are:

1. Changing water into wine at Cana in John 2:1–11 – described as "the first of the signs" in John 2:11.
2. Healing the royal official's son in Capernaum in John 4:46–54
3. Healing the paralytic at Bethesda in John 5:1–15
4. Feeding the 5000 in John 6:5–14
5. Jesus walking on water in John 6:16–24
6. Healing the man blind from birth in John 9:1–7
7. The raising of Lazarus in John 11:1–45.

The seven signs are seen by some scholars and theologians as evidence of new creation theology in the Gospel of John, the resurrection of Jesus being the implied eighth sign, indicating a week of creation and then a new creation beginning with the resurrection.

=== Other lists of seven signs ===
Some writers disagree with this list of seven signs. John Marsh and Stephen Smalley, amongst others, have suggested six initial signs (seeing the walking on the water as part of feeding the 5000, rather than a separate sign in itself), and that the seventh sign is the crucifixion of Jesus and the post-resurrection appearance to Thomas (John 20:26–29).

Anthony T. Selvaggio replaces the walking on water with the cleansing of the Temple, because John 2:18 also includes the word "sign".

=== Eighth sign ===
Others, such as John Hutchinson and E. W. Bullinger, have emphasized a sequence of eight signs, concluding with the miraculous catch of fish in John 21:1–14.
