= Mark Batterson =

American pastor and author

Mark Batterson

Mark Batterson (born November 5, 1969, in Minneapolis, Minnesota) is an American pastor and author. Batterson serves as lead pastor of National Community Church in Washington, D.C. NCC was recognized as one of the Most Innovative and Most Influential Churches in America by Outreach Magazine in 2008. Batterson is also the author of the books Win the Day, In a Pit with a Lion on a Snowy Day, and Wild Goose Chase. Batterson's New York Times bestseller The Circle Maker: Praying Circles Around Your Biggest Dreams and Greatest Fears was released in December 2011.

== Background ==
He was raised in Naperville, Illinois having been born in Minneapolis, Minnesota. Batterson first went to the University of Chicago via a scholarship to major in pre-law and play basketball. He was called to full-time ministry, which led to a move to Central Bible College in Springfield, Missouri.

== Personal ==
Batterson has a Doctor of Ministry (D.Min.) degree from Regent University. Batterson also has two master's degrees from Trinity Evangelical Divinity School in Chicago, Illinois, and a bachelor's degree from Central Bible College in Springfield, Missouri. He is a graduate of Naperville (Illinois) Central High School.

== National Community Church ==
Batterson serves as lead pastor of National Community Church in Washington, D.C. NCC has campuses in Washington, DC; Northern Virginia; and online.

Ebenezers is owned and operated by NCC. In 2008, Ebenezers was recognized as the No. 1 coffeehouse in the metro DC area by AOL CityGuide and has been profiled by The Washington Post and The Washington Times.

== New media ==
Batterson and the NCC staff became known for their use of new media. Since 2005, Batterson's sermons have been available via podcast. Batterson's use of Twitter for ministry purposes was covered by The NewsHour with Jim Lehrer in 2009.

== Books ==
Batterson is the author of 25 books, including Gradually Then Suddenly, How to Dream Bigger, Decide Better, and Leave a Lasting Legacy (Multnomah; 11/4/25), A Million Little Miracles: Rediscover the God Who Is Bigger Than Big, Closer Than Close, and Gooder Than Good (Multnomah; 11/19/24), Please, Sorry, Thanks: The Three Words That Change Everything (Multnomah; 4/3/23), Win the Day: 7 Daily Habits to Help You Stress Less & Accomplish More, Whisper: How to Hear the Voice of God, Play the Man: Becoming the Man God Created You to Be and Chase the Lion: If Your Dream Doesn't Scare You, It's Too Small. Most focus on issues of Christian living.

== Social and political views ==
=== On sex ===
Batterson is quoted by Washingtonian magazine as saying "We ought to be more concerned about being biblically correct than politically correct"..."So here is the biblical bottom line: Sex outside of marriage is wrong. Sex is a sacred covenant between a husband and a wife. Period."

=== On LGBTQ+ sexual orientation ===
During an interview with Washingtonian magazine, Batterson "[pointed] to a sermon in which he included homosexuality in a list of sexual sins."

On April 17, 2014, Batterson was a guest on "The Kojo Nnamdi Show". During the interview, Nnamdi asked Batterson: "So do you believe or consider that homosexuality is a sin?" Batterson replied:

Yeah, you know, I believe that marriage is something between a husband and a wife. I think that sex is a gift from God. It was his idea. And so our church celebrates that. But it's a gift that was meant for the covenant relationship of marriage. And so that's something that we teach and encourage.

In his sermon "The Elephant in the Church: The Gray Elephant", Batterson explains:

So when a church hangs a plaque endorsing homosexuality it's a gray elephant. It is approving of something God disapproves of. And while it may seem loving and accepting to some, it is approving of something God disapproves of. And that is neither loving nor honest.

== Books ==
- Batterson, Mark (2004). Id: the true you. Longwood, FL: Xulon Press. ISBN 9781594679094. OCLC 270993555.
- ——— (2006). In a Pit with a Lion on a Snowy Day. Sisters, OR: Multnomah Publishers. ISBN 9781590527153. OCLC 70775594.
- ——— (2008). Wild Goose Chase: Reclaim the Adventure of Pursuing God. Colorado Springs, CO: Multnomah. ISBN 9781590527191. OCLC 224442418.
- ——— (2009). Primal: A Quest for the Lost Soul of Christianity. Colorado Springs, CO: Multnomah. ISBN 9781601421319. OCLC 401141340.
- ——— (2011). Soulprint: Discovering Your Divine Destiny. Colorado Springs, CO: Multnomah. ISBN 9781601420398. OCLC 752207554. - probably a new edition of Id: the true you
- ——— (2011). The Circle Maker: Praying Circles Around Your Biggest Dreams and Greatest Fears. Grand Rapids, MI: Zondervan. ISBN 9780310333029. OCLC 733755580.
- ——— (2013). All In: You Are One Decision Away From a Totally Different Life. Grand Rapids, MI: Zondervan. ISBN 9780310333050. OCLC 833300915.
- ——— (2014). The Grave Robber: how Jesus can make your impossible possible. Grand Rapids, MI: Baker Books. ISBN 9780801015946. OCLC 871319236.
- ———; Clark, Joel N. (2014). Jack Staples and the Ring of Time. Jack Staples trilogy. Vol. 1. Colorado Springs, CO: David C Cook. ISBN 9780781411073. OCLC 863196144.
- ———; Clark, Joel N. (2015). Jack Staples and the City of Shadows. Jack Staples trilogy. Vol. 2. Colorado Springs, CO: David C Cook. ISBN 9780781411080. OCLC 879246231.
- ———; Clark, Joel N. (2015). Jack Staples and the Poet's Storm. Jack Staples trilogy. Vol. 3. Colorado Springs, CO: David C Cook. ISBN 9781434707321. OCLC 911946608.
- ——— (2015). A Trip Around the Sun: turning your everyday life into the adventure of a lifetime. Grand Rapids, MI: Baker Books. ISBN 9780801016837. OCLC 894139927.
- ——— (2015). If: Trading Your If Only Regrets for God's What If Possibilities. Grand Rapids, MI: Baker Books. ISBN 9780801016004. OCLC 903675423.
- ——— (2016). Chase the Lion: If Your Dream Doesn't Scare You, It's Too Small. Colorado Springs, CO: Multnomah. ISBN 9781601428851. OCLC 942838402.
- ——— (2017). Play the Man. Grand Rapids, MI: Baker Books. ISBN 9780801018985. OCLC 1023201872.
- ——— (2017). Whisper: How to Hear God's Voice. Colorado Springs, CO: Multnomah. ISBN 9780735291089. OCLC 975132772.
- ——— (2019). Double Blessing: Don't Settle for Less Than You're Called to Bless. Colorado Springs, CO: Multnomah. ISBN 9780735291119.
- ——— (2020). God Speaks in Whispers. Colorado Springs, CO: Multnomah. ISBN 9780735291119.
- ——— (2021). Win the Day. Colorado Springs, CO: Multnomah. ISBN 9780593192764.
- (2023) The Best Worst Day Ever: Colorado Springs, CO: Multnomah. ISBN 9780525653899
- (2023) Please, Sorry, Thanks: The Three Words That Change Everything. Colorado Springs, CO: Multnomah. ISBN 9780593192795
- (2024) A Million Little Miracles: Rediscover the God Who Is Bigger Than Big, Closer Than Close, and Gooder Than Good. Colorado Springs, CO: Multnomah. ISBN
- (2025) Gradually, then Suddenly. Colorado Spring, CO: Multnomah. ISBN 979-8-21715-207-0

== See also ==
- Religion and spirituality podcast
