= Washington and Georgetown Railroad Car House =

- U.S. National Register of Historic Places
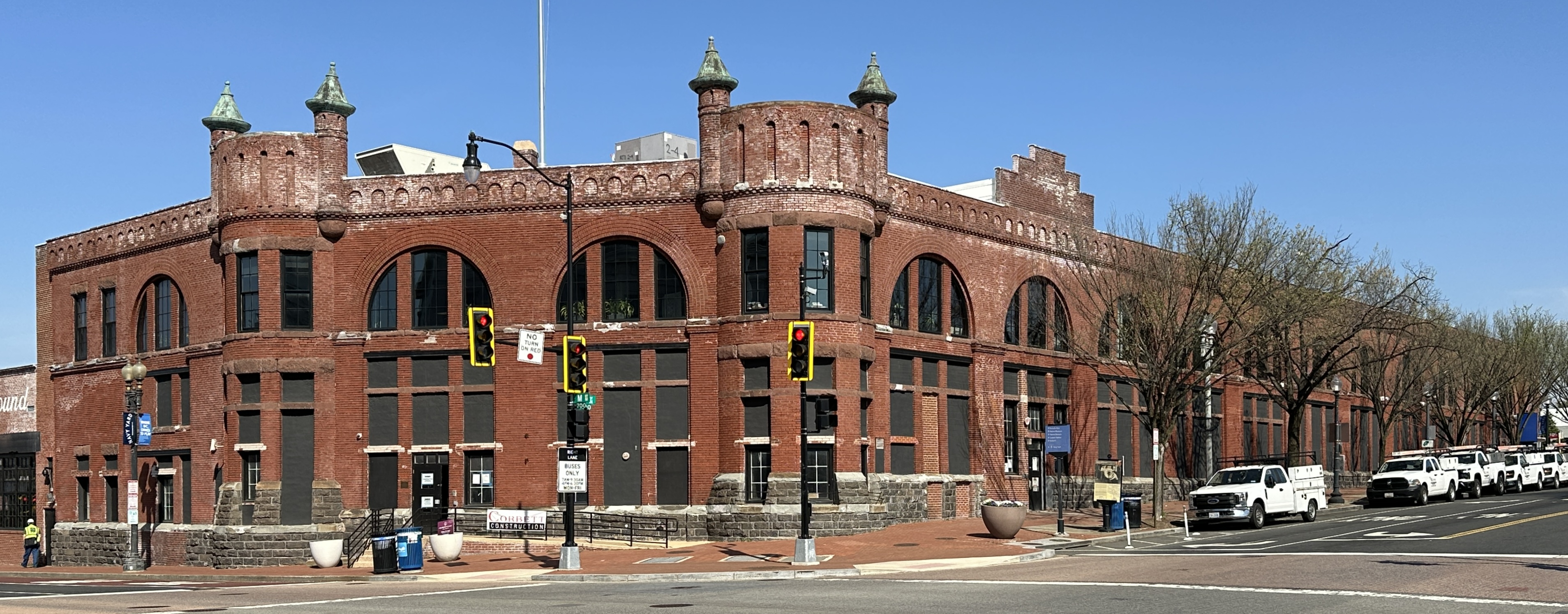
- Washington and Georgetown Railroad Car House, now known as The Capital Turnaround, in 2026

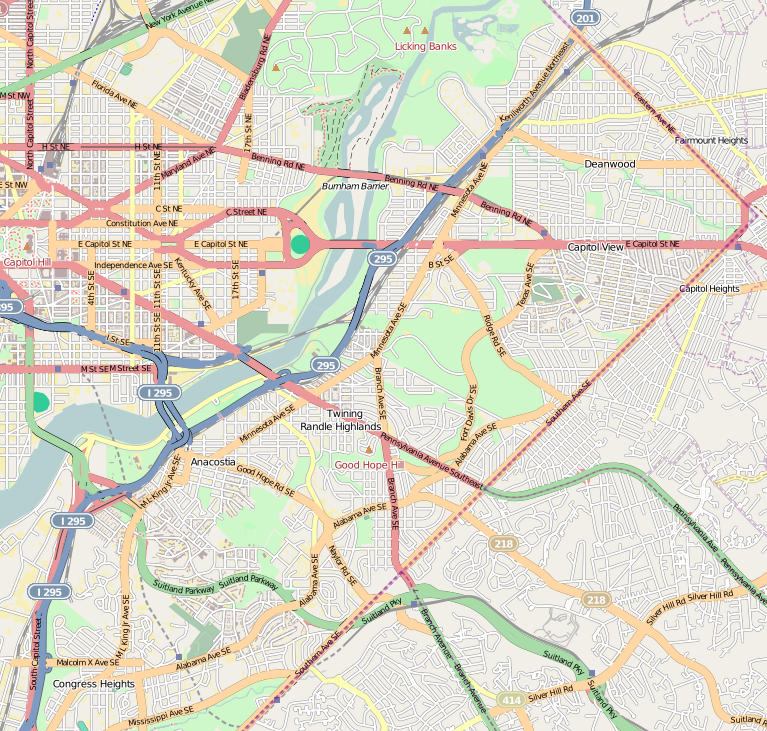
- Location within Washington, D.C. Location within the District of Columbia Location within the United States
- Location: 770 M Street, S.E., Washington, D.C.
- Coordinates: 38°52′37″N 76°59′44″W
- Built: 1893
- Architectural style: Romanesque Revival
- NRHP reference No.: 06000516
- Added to NRHP: November 14, 2006

The Washington and Georgetown Railroad Car House, also known as the Navy Yard Car Barn, or Blue Castle, is a historic building, located at 770 M Street, Southeast, Washington, D.C.

== Architecture ==
The Romanesque Revival building was designed by Walter C. Root in 1891. The most distinctive features are on the southeast facade, including towers that mimic a medieval castle. The building was enlarged in 1909 to fill the western half of the block with a one-story addition that is not as stylistically ornate, but mimics the original design.

== History ==
The car barn was one of four facilities designed by Root for the Washington and Georgetown Railroad when it was planning an expansion of its cable car service in the 1890s. The Navy Yard was the terminus of a cable car route that ran up 8th Street to Pennsylvania Avenue, continuing to Georgetown. The car barn was used to turn around the cars and ready them for their next trip across the city.

The railway was acquired by the Capital Traction Company in 1895, and after a fire destroyed the main powerhouse in 1897, the cable cars were replaced with electric. in the electric car era, the barn was primarily used for storage, and it was expanded for this purpose in 1909.

Streetcar service in DC ended in 1962, and several of the retired streetcars were stored in the Navy Yard Car Barn. The tracks leading into the car barn were paved over in 1963, whereupon the building was used as a bus garage. The building was later sold, was leased by the United States Department of Labor and was used to store records until the mid-1970s. The building was then abandoned.

The National Park Service added the building to the National Register of Historic Places (NRHP) on November 14, 2006. It is only Washington and Georgetown Railroad Company building to survive the cable car era, which was one of the reasons that the NPS decided to add it to the NHRP.

== Redevelopment ==
The 770 Limited Partnership of Bethesda, Maryland purchased the building during the 1990s, whereupon the structure was used for office space and a small restaurant. During that time, the building was painted bright blue.

In 2005, Preferred Real Estate Investments, Inc., bought the building and made plans to use it for retail space. At the time, the building held three charter schools. In January 2008, Madison Marquette Real Estate Services purchased the building, held it as an investment and used its space for offices.

In 2014, Madison Marquette sold the building to the National Community Church. The new owner then began to renovate the building, which it renamed "The Capital Turnaround". The church also made plans to repurpose the building for use as an indoor marketplace, a child development center and an event space in which the church would conduct services.

In 2019, a church spokesperson stated that the organization would restore the building's historic coloration, rather than retain its blue tint.

An 850-seat event space opened in the building in the summer of 2021, with bookings run by Union Stage. Comedian Hannibal Buress was the inaugural show at the venue in August 2021.

In October 2021, a child development center opened in the building.
