= The Miracle Theatre =

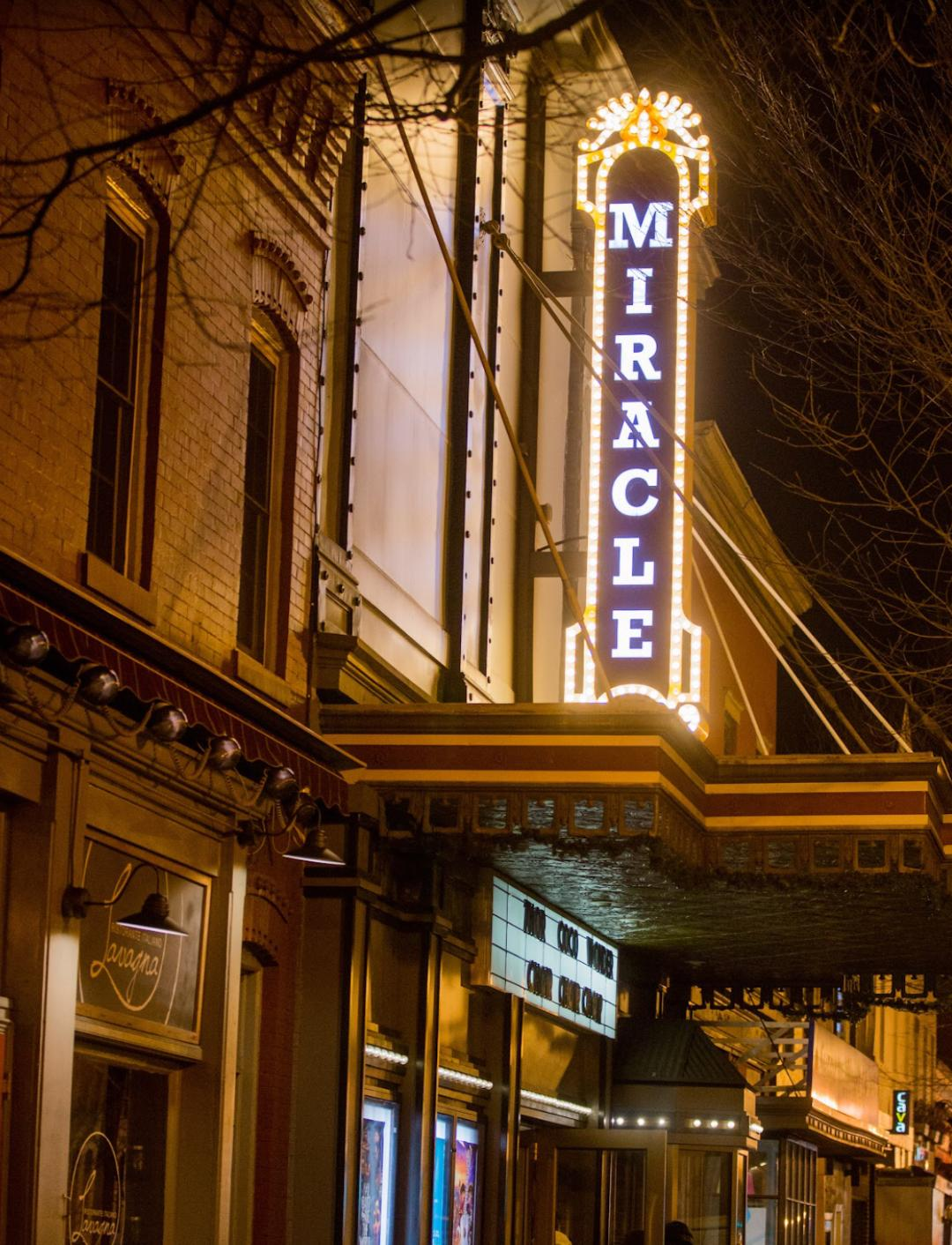
- The facade of The Miracle Theatre
- Interactive map of the The Miracle Theatre area

General information
- Location: 535 8th Street SE, Washington D.C., United States
- Coordinates: 38.8817°N 76.9953°W
- Opened: December 27th, 1909
- Owner: National Community Church

The Miracle Theatre is a single-screen movie theater and live events venue located in the Barracks Row neighborhood of Washington, D.C. Opening in 1909, it is the city's oldest operating movie theater. It is now owned and operated by National Community Church.

== History ==
The Miracle Theatre opened on December 27, 1909 as The Meader Theater. Seating 480, it had a single screen, as well as a stage. Specializing as a vaudeville theater, it showed motion pictures and hosted live entertainment. The theater changed names and ownership multiple times leading up to the 1960's including: The New Meader Theater in 1924, The Family Theater in 1930, and The Academy Theater in 1933.

During its time as The Academy Theater, the space transitioned into specializing in screenings of Westerns and foreign films, lasting until the 1960's. In 1962, The Peoples Church (now known as the People's Congregational United Church of Christ) bought the building. They renovated the space and held services until 2011. On March 23, 2011, National Community Church purchased the building and began efforts to restore the building back into a historic theater. In May 2016, the space reopened under its current name: The Miracle Theatre, an homage to its life as a church. It ran as a second run theater and a community space until 2026.

== Today ==
The Miracle Theatre now specializes in limited screenings and live events. It hosts film series events periodically throughout the year, as well as local premiers, film festivals, and private screenings. It can be rented out for special events. The theater is also partnered with the live events group Union Stage and hosts concerts, comedy shows, podcasts, and spoken word performances including The Moth's StorySLAM.
