= New creation (theology) =

Concept found in the New Testament

The new creation (Greek: καινὴ κτίσις) is a concept found in the Old Testament and New Testament, related to the new life (ἐν καινότητι ζωῆς) and new man (referring to the spiritual rebirth through Christ Jesus) (καινός ἄνθρωπος) but with reference also to the Genesis creation narrative.

== In the Old Testament ==
The theology of new creation arises from the Old Testament. In light of the coming destruction as covenant curses, the prophets also speak of a subsequent restoration afterwards. Among the ways that this restoration is described is through new creation. For example, Isaiah 65:17 (NIV) reads, “See, I will create new heavens and a new earth. The former things will not be remembered, nor will they come to mind." The remainder of the Isaiah 65-66 explore the nature of new creation.

== In the letters of Paul ==
The language of a new creation is not limited to the two verses in the Authorized King James Version that include that actual phrase (Gal. 6:15, 2 Cor 5:17). Other passages, such as Galatians 6:12-16, 2 Corinthians 5:14-19, Ephesians 2:11-22, Ephesians 4:17-24, and Colossians 3:1-11 present new creation teaching also, without that exact phrase.

Other references to the concept include Ephesians 2:10, "For we are his workmanship, created in Christ Jesus for good works, which God prepared beforehand, that we should walk in them." The old, Adamic creation could not be said to be in any sense "in Christ," so this must therefore be speaking of new creation.

Often the themes of the Genesis creation and new creation are contrasted, according to N. T. Wright, in Colossians chapter 1, where the old creation and new creation in Christ (1:15-20) are compared with the new creation (vv. 21–23).

== Other New Testament references ==
The first words of Matthew may also be an allusion to the idea of a new creation, with a double entendre in Matthew's word genesis (γένεσις) between the meanings of "origin", "Genesis" (the first book of Moses) and "genealogy":

- Genesis 1:0 Septuagint: The Book of Creation [of Moses] (Βίβλος γενέσεως [Μωσέως])
- Matthew 1:1 Koine Greek: The Book of Creation of Jesus Christ (Βίβλος γενέσεως Ἰησοῦ Χριστοῦ)

There are also allusions of new creation in the Gospel of John including:

- John starts with the words "In the beginning was the word," mirroring the beginning of Genesis.
- Jesus' final words in John are "it is finished" John 19:30, mirroring the words of "completed" in Genesis 2:1.
- Emphasising twice that the resurrection events occurred on "the first day of the week" John 20:1,19.
- The resurrection of Jesus being the implied eighth sign after seven signs in the Gospel of John, indicating a week of creation and then a new creation beginning with the resurrection.
- The resurrection of Jesus takes place from within a garden tomb (19:41) and, upon encountering the risen Jesus, Mary Magdalene initially thinks him to be "the gardener" (20:15). This emphasis on the garden and Jesus being the gardener, may be an allusion to Eden, the garden God planted (Gen. 2:8) to which the first humans were sent to be gardeners.
- Jesus breathes on the disciples, saying "receive the Holy Spirit" John 20:22, mirroring God breathing into Adam in Genesis 2:7.

References in the other Gospels include:

- The story of the two disciples and Luke stating that "their eyes were opened," 24:31, mirroring Genesis 3:7.

== See also ==
- World to Come
- Supersessionism
