= National Community Church =

Assemblies of God church

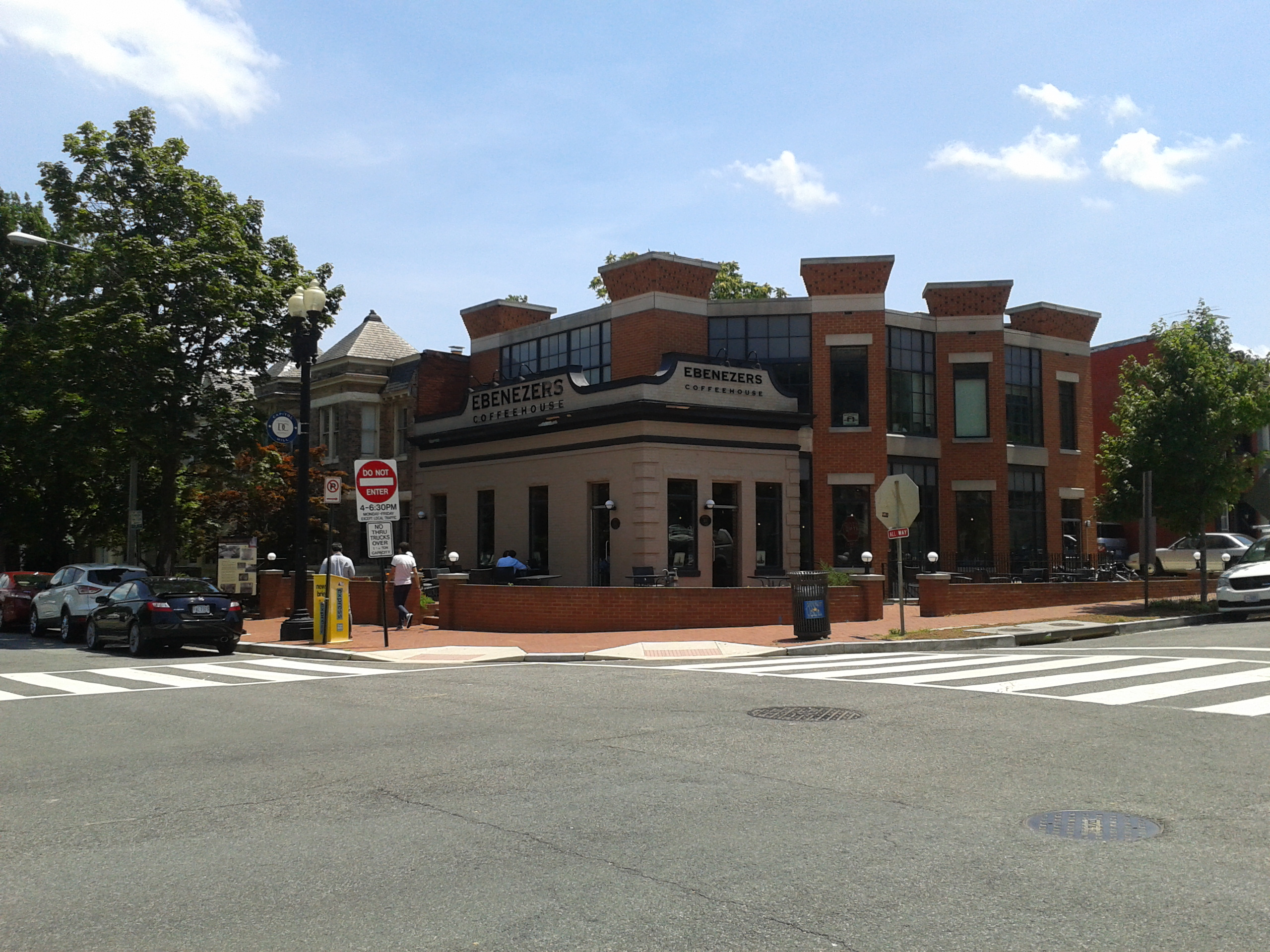
- Ebenezers Coffeehouse and headquarters of the National Community Church in Washington, D.C.
- Address: Washington, D.C. Springfield, Virginia
- Denomination: Pentecostal
- Website: national.cc

History
- Founded: 1996

National Community Church (NCC) is a Pentecostal multi-site megachurch based in Washington, D.C., pastored by Mark Batterson. It is affiliated with the Assemblies of God USA.

== History ==
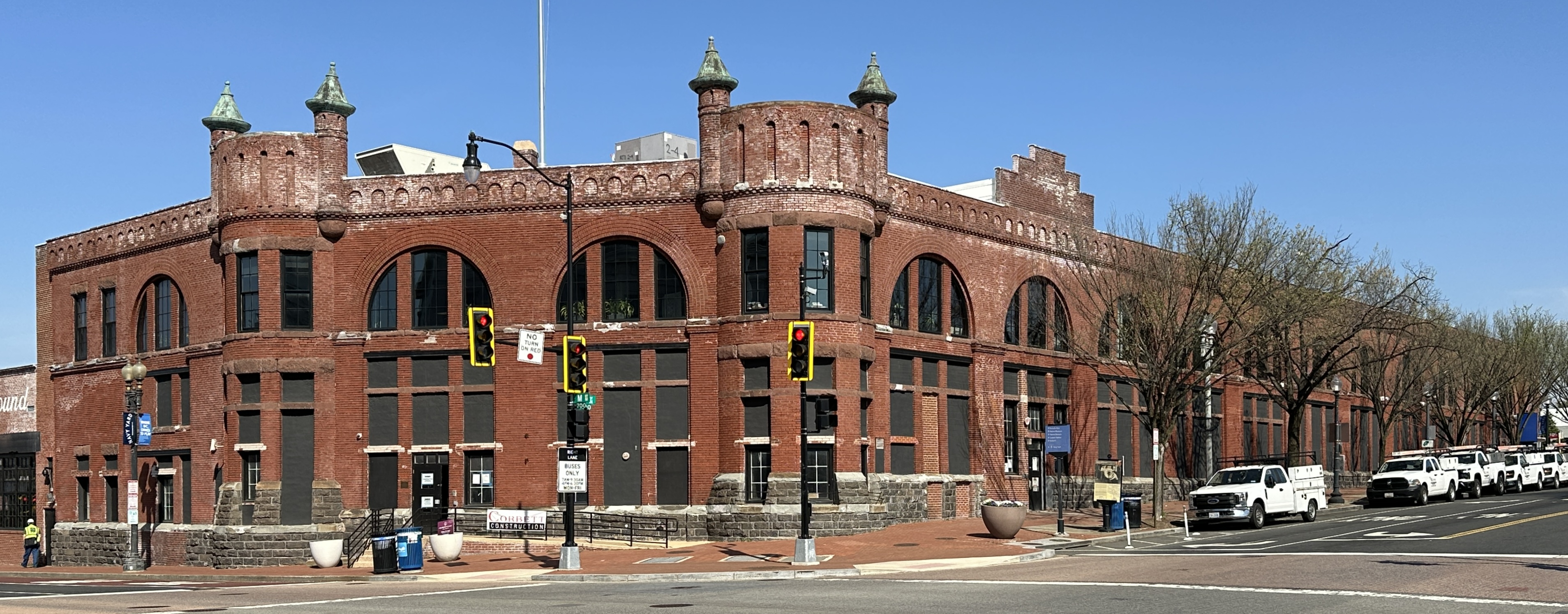
NCC's primary campus in the Navy Yard area of Washington, D.C., is the former Washington and Georgetown Railroad Car House.

National Community Church held its first Sunday service on January 7, 1996. During the first nine months of 1996, average attendance at Sunday services was between 20 and 25 people. At the time, all meetings were at the Joshua R. Giddings school in southeast Washington, DC, but the school was closed due to fire code violations.

NCC found a new home in the AMC Theatres at Union Station, holding its first services there on November 17, 1996. A second Sunday service was added in February 2001 when the church grew to 275 weekly attendees. In an August 2001 article in the Washington Post, the congregation was described as "young" and "casually dressed", and Batterson remarked that the church was "right in the middle of the marketplace." In five years, the congregation at Union Station grew to over 500. NCC launched its second location in the Regal Entertainment Group theaters at Ballston Common Mall in Arlington, Virginia in 2003, using a pre-recorded video to present sermons in both locations on Sundays.

In 2005, NCC began making its sermons available online via podcast.

In March 2006, after investing a few million dollars to renovate an abandoned building a few blocks from Union Station, NCC opened Ebenezer's, a coffeehouse serving fair trade and organic coffee, with church offices located on the top floor and an event space in the basement. Ebenezer's has been recognized as one of the best coffeehouses in DC. The basement of Ebenezer's became the regular venue for a Saturday worship service and the live taping of weekly sermons.

The church expanded to movie theaters in Georgetown and Kingstowne, Virginia, and Sunday services were held at Ebenezer's when the movie theater at Union Station abruptly closed in October 2009. In 2010, NCC began a Sunday evening service at the GALA Hispanic Theatre in Columbia Heights, Washington, D.C. and a regular Sunday service in Potomac Yard in Virginia.

In 2011, NCC purchased a century-old theater on Barracks Row in Capitol Hill, which was originally known as Meader's Theater and had been home to the People's Church since 1962. In March 2011, NCC's congregation totaled around 2,000, and the theater became the NCC's central site, hosting multiple Sunday services and the Saturday afternoon taping of the sermon distributed to the other six locations and online. Over the next several years, the theater was renovated and in May 2016 it opened to the public as a movie theater and performance venue, named the "Miracle Theatre."

In 2012, NCC entered into a partnership with a community organization, the Southeast White House, to buy an abandoned apartment building in the Hillcrest neighborhood of Washington, D.C. The building was renovated into a community center with a dance studio, basketball court, art center, computer lab, and recording studio, opening in 2017 as the "DC Dream Center."

NCC celebrated Easter 2014 with 800 congregants at the historic Lincoln Theatre on U Street in Washington, D.C., where the church established a new weekly Sunday service. In April 2014, NCC had over 3,000 congregants attending services in seven locations.

In late 2014, NCC purchased the Navy Yard Car Barn, several blocks south of the Miracle Theatre on Barracks Row. The building was renovated and renamed Capital Turnaround, re-opening in 2021 with an 850-seat auditorium used for Sunday worship services.

In 2023, NCC led an Easter sunrise service at the Lincoln Memorial, taking over a tradition that was started by Capital Church in 1979.

== Affiliations ==
National Community Church is affiliated with the Assemblies of God USA and the Willow Creek Association.
