= Central Bible College =

Assemblies of God college in Springfield, Missouri, U.S.

Coordinates: 37°15′09″N 93°17′44″W

- Motto: "To train ministers and missionaries for the 21st century"
- Type: Private Bible College
- Active: 1922–2013
- Affiliations: Assemblies of God
- Location: Springfield, Missouri, U.S.
- Campus: 108 acres (43.7 ha)
- Nickname: Spartans
- Website: www.cbcag.edu

Central Bible College (CBC) was a private coeducational Bible college affiliated with the Assemblies of God. It was founded in 1922 with the main campus located in Springfield, Missouri, United States. The campus closed in May 2013 when the school consolidated with Evangel University and Assemblies of God Theological Seminary. All three institutions were located in Springfield and owned and operated by the Assemblies of God. The consolidated university officially began operating with the Fall 2013 semester and is known as Evangel University.

== Accreditation ==
Central Bible College was first accredited with the Association for Biblical Higher Education in 1948 and was last reaccredited in 2006. In addition, Central Bible College was fully accredited by the Higher Learning Commission of the North Central Association of Colleges and Schools and was last reaccredited in 2010.

== History ==
CBC was founded by the General Council of the Assemblies of God in 1922 to meet a need for ministerial training in the young denomination, which had formed in 1914. The first class met in the basement of an old church building but quickly outgrew that space. With a $5,000 donation from local businessmen, CBC purchased a 15-acre tract on North Grant Avenue in Springfield. They moved into the first permanent building on the campus, Bowie Hall, in 1924. The first class graduated in 1925. Additional land was acquired over the years and the campus increased to 32 acres. CBC grew rapidly, fueled by mergers with three other schools in the early years: Bethel Bible Training Institute of Newark, New Jersey in 1929, South Central Bible College of Hot Springs, Arkansas in 1953, and Great Lakes Bible Institute of Zion, Illinois in 1954. CBC operated on the North Grant campus until May 2013 when the campus was closed due to CBC's consolidation with Evangel University and Assemblies of God Theological Seminary. The campus was sold by the General Council of the Assemblies in May 2019 to South Korean-based Good News Mission, an independent Baptist organization.

== Academics ==
At the time of consolidation and closure, Central Bible College offered 21 undergraduate Bachelor of Arts majors in four divisional categories focused on preparing students for full-time, vocational ministry. Most of these programs were incorporated into the consolidated university through the creation of Evangel's School of Theology and Church Ministries in 2013. The STCM is organized into three departments: Bible & Theology, Church Ministries, and Intercultural Studies. Graduate degrees are offered through the university's embedded seminary.

== Athletics ==
Central Bible College offered men's soccer, women's volleyball, cheerleading, and men and women's basketball. The Spartans were part of Division II of the National Christian College Athletic Association. CBC was known for its successful men's basketball program, which was under the direction of Coach Kirk Hanson for 34 years. Despite not offering athletic scholarships, the team won 23 regional championships, appeared in the NCCAA National Tournament 30 times, and won the national championship in 1994, 2001 and 2002. On January 25, 2011, Hanson had his 700th career win as head coach of the Spartans. Coach Hanson was named National Coach of the Year four times and is a member of the Missouri Sports Hall of Fame. After the consolidation, Hanson was named basketball coach at Branson High School in nearby Branson, Missouri.

== Notable alumni ==
- Mark Batterson, author and pastor of National Community Church in Washington D.C
- Paul Crouch, American religious broadcaster
- Loren Cunningham, founder of YWAM
- Larry W. Hurtado, author and New Testament scholar
- Craig Keener, author and professor at Asbury Theological Seminary
- Dan McConchie, Illinois State Senator
- David Wilkerson, founder of Teen Challenge
