= Gospel of John =

Book of the New Testament

- ← Gospel of Luke
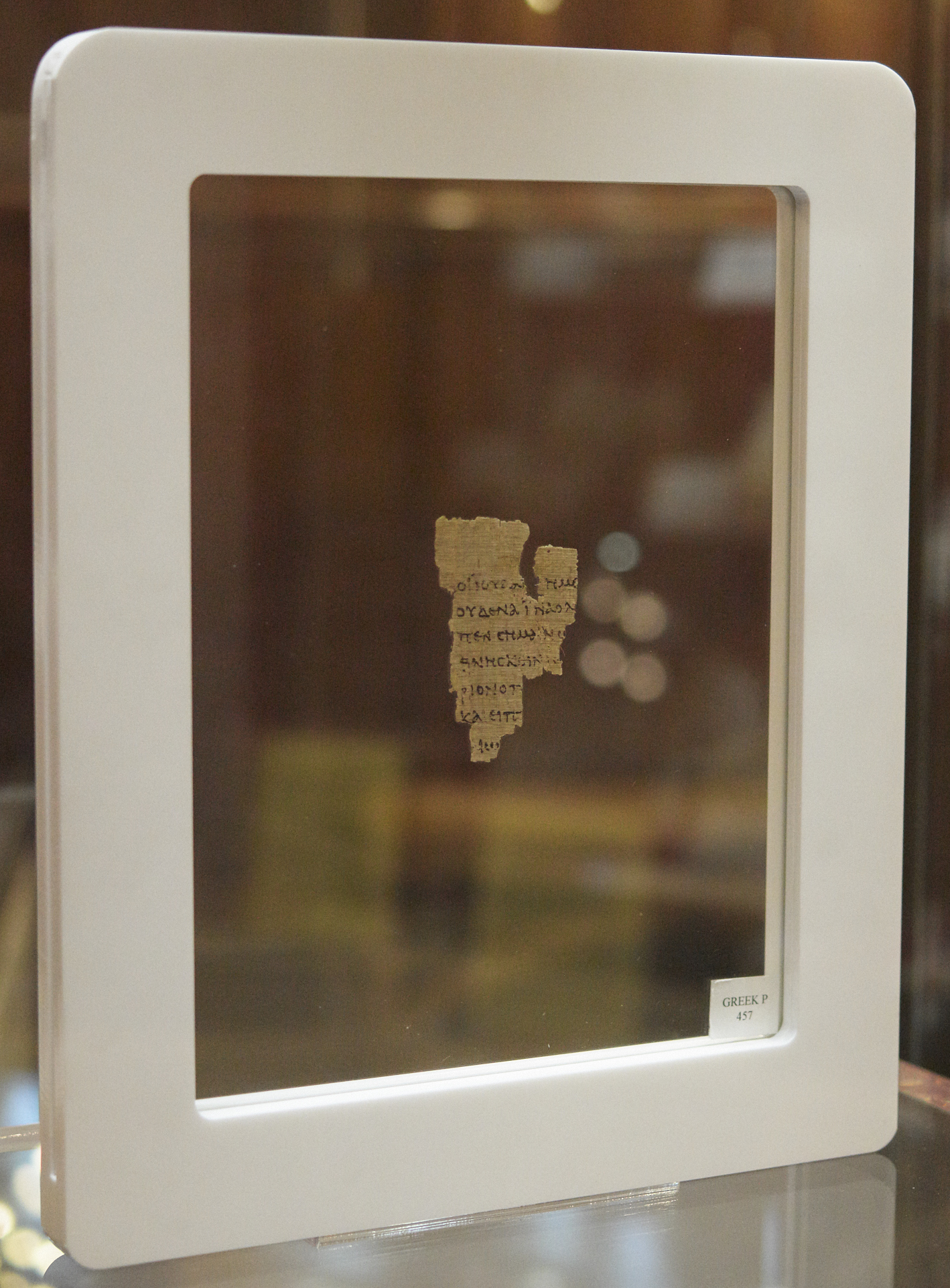
- John 18:31–33 on Papyrus 52 (recto; c. AD 150)

Information
- Religion: Christianity
- Author: Traditionally John the Apostle
- Language: Koinē Greek
- Period: 90–100 AD
- Chapters: 21
- Verses: 879

Full text
- Gospel of John at Greek Wikisource
- Gospel of John at English Wikisource

The Gospel of John is the fourth gospel of the canonical Gospels in the New Testament. The first section of the gospel presents a short introduction followed by a schematic account of the ministry of Jesus, with seven signs that culminate in the raising of Lazarus and validate the truth of his words. The second part of the text portrays the final week of Jesus’s life, recounting the Farewell Discourse and the passion and resurrection narratives.

Most scholars agree that the Gospel of John was completed between 90–100 AD. It identifies an unnamed "disciple whom Jesus loved" as its source and, perhaps, author. Recent scholarship has moved away from the paradigm of a "Johannine community." Most scholars treat the gospel and the Johannine epistles, along with the Book of Revelation, as a single corpus of Johannine literature, albeit not by the same author.

This gospel displays a literary unity throughout its text, and the current scholarly tendency is to approach the work as a coherent whole by a single author. It contains the clearest identifications of Jesus with the God of Israel in the Christian texts, with Jesus in the form of the Logos being paralleled in Greek philosophy and Targumic concepts of the divine.

Although the Gospel of John is distinct from the Synoptic Gospels, scholars today increasingly trend towards John's knowledge and usage of the Synoptics, though scholars show that the relationship between Mark and John is best understood through as parallel autonomous traditions rather than source dependence to present a bioptic view of Jesus' ministry that supports the historicity of the Gospels. John's relatively free usage of Mark aligns with the compositional practices of antiquity while contrasting with the unusually conservative adaptations found by the Synoptic authors.

== Authorship ==
=== Composition ===
The Gospel of John is traditionally attributed to John the Apostle. While many modern scholars continue to affirm the traditional attribution, first found in Irenaeus (c. 130 – c. 202 AD), most have moved away from this hypothesis for alternatives such as John the Elder or Lazarus, though they view "the beloved disciple" as the source of much of John's content. The gospel is internally anonymous. The second half of the gospel features a disciple whom Jesus loved at key episodes such as the Last Supper and the Empty Tomb, with John 21:24–25 saying: "This is the disciple who is testifying to these things and has written them, and we know that his testimony is true". Most scholars believe the verses claim the beloved disciple was the author of the gospel, but others argue the author is claiming to be someone else recording the disciple's testimony. (Note: Attridge: The final reference (John 21:24) makes the claim that this figure is "the one who wrote these things." Most scholars construe the verse to claim that the Beloved Disciple authored the text, or at least chapters 1-20. Some, however, have argued that the passage merely claims that the Beloved Disciple is the authoritative witness who caused the work to be written, or who perhaps wrote an early account of Jesus on which the final gospel was based.) The beloved disciple is generally considered a historical person, though a growing number of scholars have argued the disciple was a literary creation with the advent of literary criticism. There is no consensus on who the beloved disciple was. John 1:14 also switches to a first-person narration, saying "And the Word became flesh and tabernacled among us, and we have seen his glory, the glory as of a father's only son, full of grace and truth," revealing himself as a participant in the events narrated. The gospel gradually identifies its narrator as the beloved disciple by chapter 19. The scholarly consensus dates the writing of the gospel between AD 90–100. Most critical commentaries agree the gospel was likely composed in Ephesus.

Recent scholarship has tended to turn against positing hypothetical sources for John. While a few scholars support old ideas about debated sources like the "signs source" and the "sayings source", or develop new theories, it is widely considered that John incorporated synoptic traditions into his own composition instead. For much of the twentieth century, the consensus was that John was fully independent from the Synoptics, but scholars increasingly accept John knew or interacted with the Synoptic gospels. Though many scholars also note that the relationship between synoptics and John is best understood through as parallel autonomous traditions rather than source dependence to present a bioptic view of Jesus' ministry that supports the historicity of the Gospels. The Hebrew scriptures were an important source, with 14 direct quotations (versus 27 in Mark, 54 in Matthew, 24 in Luke), and their influence is vastly increased when allusions and echoes are included, but the majority of John's direct quotations do not agree exactly with any known version of the Jewish scriptures. Reminiscent of the author of Luke-Acts as well as later apocryphal gospels such as Thomas and Peter, the author of John uses first-person and may claim to be a witness in John 21, 1:14, and 19:35. (Note: Most scholars agree the Gospels do not contain direct eyewitness accounts, though this may partly be the result of dubious assumptions based on form criticism.) Tom Thatcher, writing for the Oxford Handbook of Johannine Studies, argues that while the beloved disciple did not write the current form of the gospel, this does not entail reconstructions that put the author multiple stages or generations away from the disciple. Instead, he argues that the Fourth Evangelist was a companion of the beloved disciple who either wrote by the disciple's dictation or expanded his work. René Kieffer notes the possibility that there may have been a first and then a second edition.

=== The Johannine community ===
There is considerable debate over the gospel of John’s social, religious, and historical context. The paradigm of a hypothetical "Johannine community”, dominant in the 20th century, has lost its preeminence in contemporary scholarship. The hypothesis claimed that the Johannine literature sprang from a late 1st-century Christian community that was excommunicated from the Jewish community, with the gospel reflecting a break between Johannine Christians and Jews as the community disintegrated. This interpretation, which saw the community as sectarian and outside the mainstream of early Christianity, has been increasingly challenged in the 21st century; according to Richard Bauckham, the gospels as Greco-Roman biographies assumed a wide audience rather than individual communities and early churches maintained close contact with one another, and Edward Klink has further questioned a two-level reading of the gospel and the Johannine community paradigm. Hugo Mendez contends that the pseudepigraphal nature of the Gospel and epistles’ claim to eyewitness authorship renders them unreliable sources for historical reconstruction or the Johannine community. Christopher Skinner noted that Raymond E. Brown's multiple-stage communal theories were arguably tendentious, and usage of the Birkat Haminim as a first century text has been questioned.

== Structure and content ==
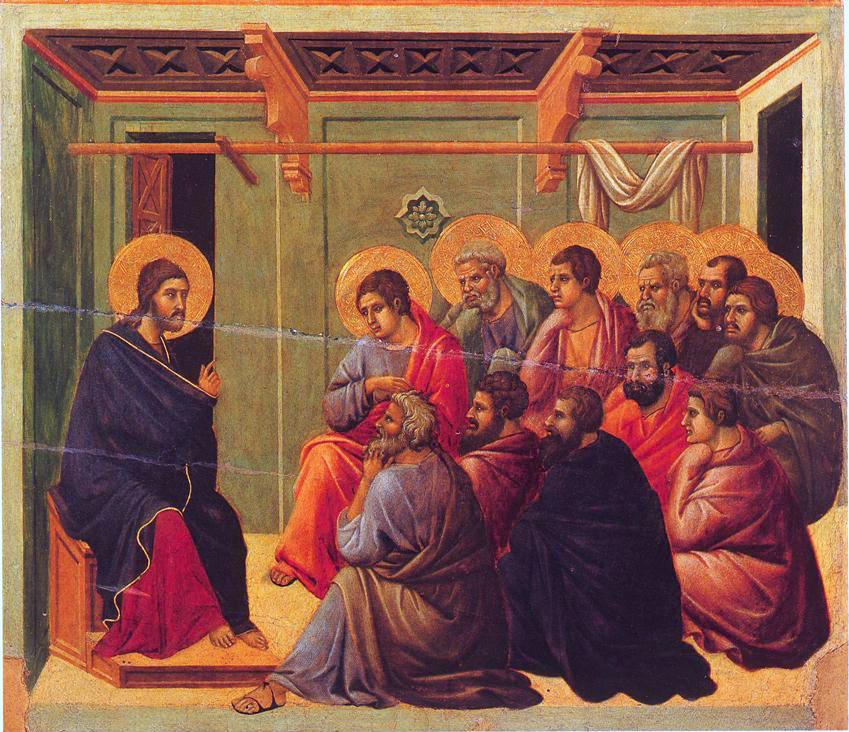
Jesus giving the Farewell Discourse to his 11 remaining disciples, from the Maestà of Duccio, 1308–1311

The first section of the Gospel of John presents a short prolegomenon followed by a schematic account of the ministry of Jesus, with seven signs that culminate in the raising of Lazarus and validate the truth of his words. The second part of the text portrays the final week of Jesus’s life, recounting the Farewell Discourse and the passion and resurrection narratives. The gospel is usually divided into a prologue (1:1–18), an account of the ministry often called the "Book of Signs" (1:19–12:50), the account of Jesus's final night with his disciples and the passion and resurrection, called the Book of Glory or Book of Exaltation (13:1–20:31), and an epilogue (Chapter 21). The division of the gospel in this way was popularized by the American Catholic scholar Raymond E. Brown.

A growing number of scholars, such as Bauckham, and Mark Goodacre, argue that John 21 was part of the original work given the lack of manuscript evidence otherwise. Chapters 15-17 and 21 are commonly believed to be added by either the author of the rest of the gospel or by somebody else; Adele Reinhartz describes it as an epilogue not necessarily written by a different author, and Attridge notes that proposing stages in the gospel's composition does not imply a change in authorship. John displays a profound coherence and unity throughout, and the view of the gospel as a communal product of multiple editions is today in retreat, as literary critics approach the work as a unitary text.

- The prologue informs readers of the true identity of Jesus, the Word of God through whom the world was created and who took on human form; he came to the Jews and the Jews rejected him, but "to all who received him (the circle of Christian believers), who believed in his name, he gave power to become children of God."
- Book of Signs (ministry of Jesus): Jesus calls his disciples and begins his earthly ministry. He travels from place to place informing his hearers about God the Father in long discourses, offering eternal life to all who will believe, and performing seven miraculous ‘signs’ that prove the authenticity of his teachings, which creates tensions with the religious authorities (manifested as early as 5:17–18), who decide he must be eliminated.
- The Book of Glory tells of Jesus' return to his heavenly father: it tells how he prepares his disciples for their lives without his physical presence and his prayer for himself and for them, followed by his betrayal, arrest, trial, crucifixion and post-resurrection appearances.
- The concluding verse of the gospel's penultimate chapter seems to declare the gospel's overall purpose: "that you may continue (disputed) to believe that Jesus is the Messiah, the Son of God, and that through believing you may have life in his name." (Note: Whether the purpose set out in John 20:31 is purely evangelical or strictly to strengthen the faith already held by an audience of believers is unclear. The translators behind the NET translation note here that the Gospel may be dual-purposed: firstly, to be a witness to unbelievers; secondly, to strengthen the faith of those, perhaps of an existing Johannine community, who already believe.)
- Chapter 21 tells of Jesus' post-resurrection appearances in Galilee, the miraculous catch of fish, the prophecy of the crucifixion of Peter, and the fate of the Beloved Disciple.

The structure is highly schematic: there are seven "signs" culminating in the raising of Lazarus (foreshadowing the resurrection of Jesus) and seven "I am" sayings and discourses, culminating in Thomas's proclamation of the risen Jesus as "my Lord and my God" (the same title, dominus et deus, claimed by the Emperor Domitian, is an indication of the date of composition).

== Theology ==
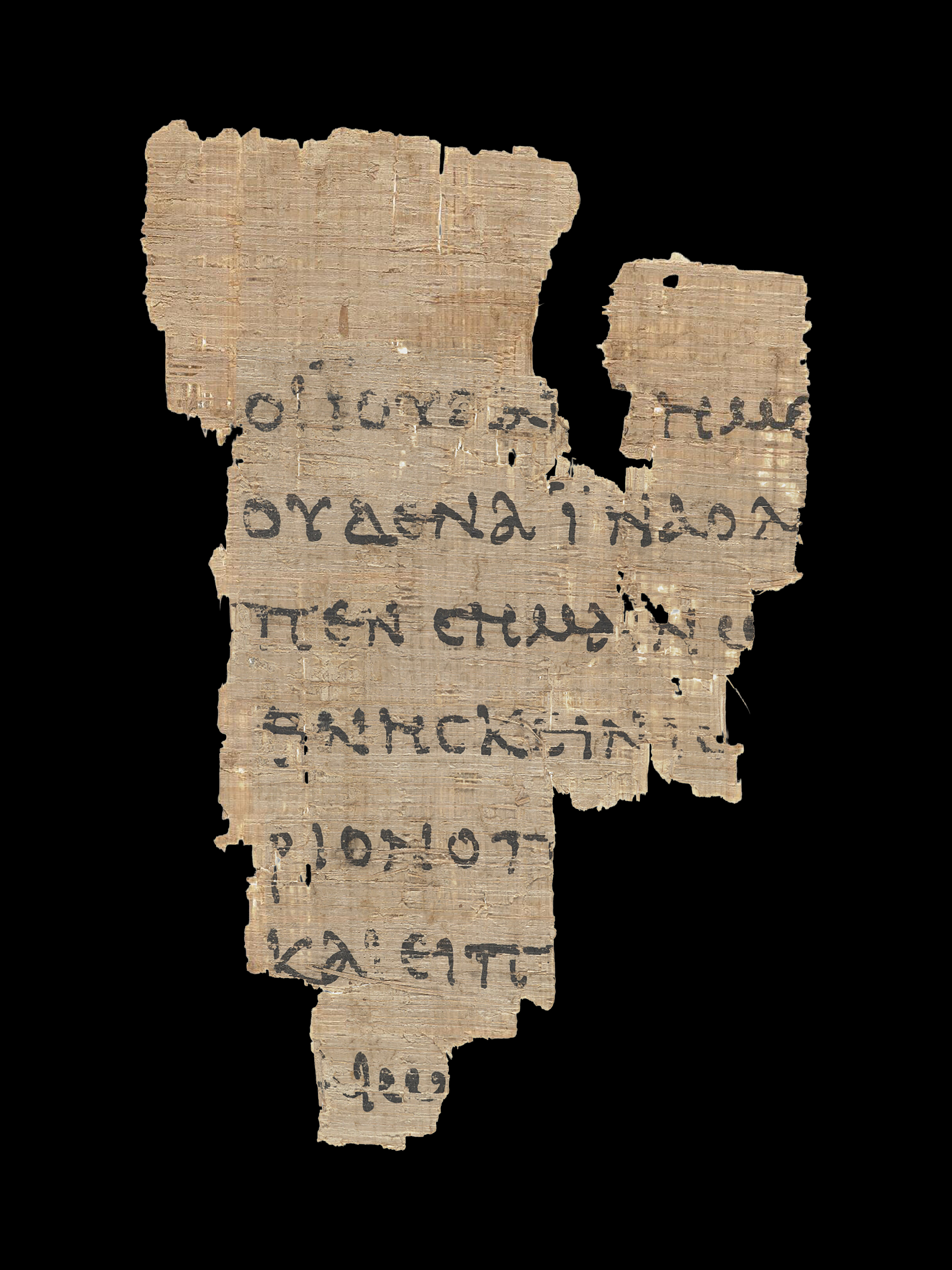
The Rylands Papyrus is the oldest known New Testament fragment, dated to about 125–175 AD.

=== Christology ===
The Gospel of John contains some of the clearest identifications of Jesus with God in the New Testament; while Jesus is subordinate to God at times, the author also indicates that Jesus and God are somehow one. The prologue identifies Jesus as the Logos (Word) and identifies the Word as "God", and in the gospel while not being God the Father, Jesus is like the Father and claims the same powers and abilities as God. In Ancient Greek philosophy, the term logos referred to the principle of cosmic reason. In this sense, it was similar to the Hebrew concept of Wisdom, God's companion and intimate helper in creation. Pope Benedict XVI highlights a connection that this Gospel has with the Old Testament. According to James Dunn, this Christology does not describe a subordinationist relation but rather the authority and validity of the Son's "revelation" of the Father, the continuity between the Father and the Son; to Dunn, this is intended to serve the Logos Christology. Others (e.g., Andrew Loke) view it as connected to the theme of incarnation found within the Gospel. James Barker maintains that important aspects of Trinitarianism are present within the New Testament and that an economic Trinity "stood ready-made in the Gospel of John," and Larry Hurtado likewise argues that the books of the New Testament possess a triadic understanding of God and contain a number of Trinitarian formulas, despite not including any explicit references to the developed doctrine.

Mark Goodacre describes Johannine Christology as both derived from and largely continuous with Synoptic Christology while also developing the relationship between the Father and Son. The high Christology of this Gospel depicts Jesus as divine and pre-existent, speaking openly regarding his role, and echoing the "I Am that I Am" of Yahweh with seven "I Am" declarations of his own, which were adapted from I Am sayings in Mark and Matthew in line with John’s habit of reproducing familiar Synoptic material before adding new content. (Note: The declarations are: "I am the bread of life"; "I am the light of the world"; "I am the gate for the sheep"; "I am the good shepherd"; "I am the resurrection and the life"; "I am the way and the truth and the life"; "I am the true vine".)

Paul N. Anderson has argued that the Johannine "I Am" sayings, while theologically distinctive, share elements with Synoptic traditions and Hebrew scripture, suggesting they may reflect early traditional material that could support the historical reliability of the Gospel accounts.

Philo, a Hellenistic Jewish philosopher, merged these themes when he described the Logos as God's creator of and mediator with the material world; Philo also calls the Logos "the second god." According to Stephen Harris, the author adapted and applied Philo's description of the Logos to Jesus as the incarnation of the Logos. Another possibility is found in the Targums, which postdate the 1st-century but still give evidence of early tradition. The concept of the Word is similar to Philo's description, such as in God's interaction with the world and with his people.

=== Cross ===
The portrayal of Jesus's death in John is unique among the gospels. It does not appear to rely on the kinds of atonement theology indicative of vicarious sacrifice but rather presents Jesus's death as his glorification and return to the Father. Likewise, the Synoptic Gospels' three "passion predictions" are replaced by three instances of Jesus explaining how he will be exalted or "lifted up". The verb for "lifted up" (Ancient Greek: ὑψωθῆναι, hypsōthēnai) reflects the double entendre at work in John's theology of the cross, for Jesus is both physically elevated from the earth at the crucifixion but also, at the same time, exalted and glorified.

John's Gospel intimately links the crucifixion with themes of new birth and eternal life. Jesus' statement in John 3:14-15 likens his being "lifted up" to the bronze serpent in the wilderness, indicating that belief in the crucified Christ confers eternal life. Hence, the cross inaugurates a new covenantal reality and the possibility of spiritual rebirth. This emphasizes the life-giving rather than punitive aspects of Jesus' death. Like in the Gospel of Luke, emphasis is placed on the physical continuity of Jesus's resurrected body; Jesus says to Thomas: "Put your finger here and see my hands. Reach out your hand and put it in my side. Do not doubt but believe."

=== Sacraments ===
Scholars disagree on whether and how frequently John refers to sacraments, but current scholarly opinion is that there are very few such possible references, and that if they exist they are limited to baptism and the Eucharist. Despite the lack of institution of the Eucharist in John's account of the Last Supper (it is replaced by Jesus washing the feet of his disciples), James Barker argues for John’s presupposition of Eucharist in the Bread of Life Discourse. No New Testament text unambiguously links baptism with rebirth.

=== Individualism ===
Compared to the synoptic gospels, John is markedly individualistic, in the sense that it places emphasis more on the individual's relation to Jesus than on the corporate nature of the Church. This is largely accomplished through the consistently singular grammatical structure of various aphoristic sayings of Jesus. (Note: Bauckham 2015a contrasts John's consistent use of the third person singular ("The one who..."; "If anyone..."; "Everyone who..."; "Whoever..."; "No one...") with the alternative third person plural constructions the author could have used instead ("Those who..."; "All those who..."; etc.). He also notes that the sole exception occurs in the prologue, serving a narrative purpose, whereas the later aphorisms serve a "paraenetic function".) Emphasis on believers coming into a new group upon their conversion is conspicuously absent from John, and there is a theme of "personal coinherence", that is, the intimate personal relationship between the believer and Jesus in which the believer "abides" in Jesus and Jesus in the believer. (Note: See John 6:56, 10:14–15, 10:38, and 14:10, 17, 20, and 23.) John's individualistic tendencies could give rise to a realized eschatology achieved on the level of the individual believer, but this realized eschatology is not to replace "orthodox", futurist eschatological expectations, but to be "only [their] correlative".

=== John the Baptist ===
John's account of John the Baptist is different from that of the synoptic gospels. In this gospel, John is not called "the Baptist." John the Baptist's ministry overlaps with that of Jesus; his baptism of Jesus is not explicitly mentioned, but his witness to Jesus is unambiguous. The evangelist almost certainly knew the story of John's baptism of Jesus, and makes a vital theological use of it. He subordinates John to Jesus, perhaps in response to members of John's sect who regarded the Jesus movement as an offshoot of theirs.

In the Gospel of John, Jesus and his disciples go to Judea early in Jesus's ministry before John the Baptist was imprisoned and executed by Herod Antipas. He leads a ministry of baptism larger than John's own. The Jesus Seminar rated this account as black, containing no historically accurate information. According to the biblical historians at the Jesus Seminar, John likely had a larger presence in the public mind than Jesus.

=== Gnosticism ===
In the first half of the 20th century, many scholars, especially Rudolph Bultmann, argued that the Gospel of John has elements in common with Gnosticism. Some scholars still claim such tendencies in the gospel, but given that the oldest text certainly known to be Gnostic, the Apocrypha of John, is from the mid-second century, such a paradigm is likely flawed, and most scholars consider the Gnosticism question closed. Christian Gnosticism did not fully develop until the mid-2nd century, and so 2nd-century Proto-Orthodox Christians concentrated much effort in examining and refuting it. To say the Gospel of John contained elements of Gnosticism is to assume that Gnosticism had developed to a level that required the author to respond to it. Bultmann, for example, argued that the opening theme of the Gospel of John, the preexisting Logos, along with John's duality of light versus darkness, were originally Gnostic themes that John adopted. Other scholars (e.g., Raymond E. Brown) have argued that the preexisting Logos theme arises from the more ancient Jewish writings in the eighth chapter of the Book of Proverbs, and was fully developed as a theme in Hellenistic Judaism by Philo Judaeus. The discovery of the Dead Sea Scrolls at Qumran verified the Jewish nature of these concepts. April DeConick, as well as some 19th-century theologians, suggested reading John 8:44 in support of a Gnostic theology and that the natural reading would be "ye are of the father of the Devil", but this has been disputed.

Gnostics read John but interpreted it differently from non-Gnostics. Gnosticism taught that salvation came from gnosis, secret knowledge, and Gnostics saw Jesus as not a savior but a revealer of knowledge. The gospel teaches that salvation can be achieved only through revealed wisdom, specifically belief in (literally belief into) Jesus. John's picture of a supernatural savior who promised to return to take those who believed in him to a heavenly dwelling could be fitted into Gnostic views. It has been suggested that similarities between the Gospel of John and Gnosticism may spring from common roots in Jewish Apocalyptic literature.

== Comparison with other writings ==
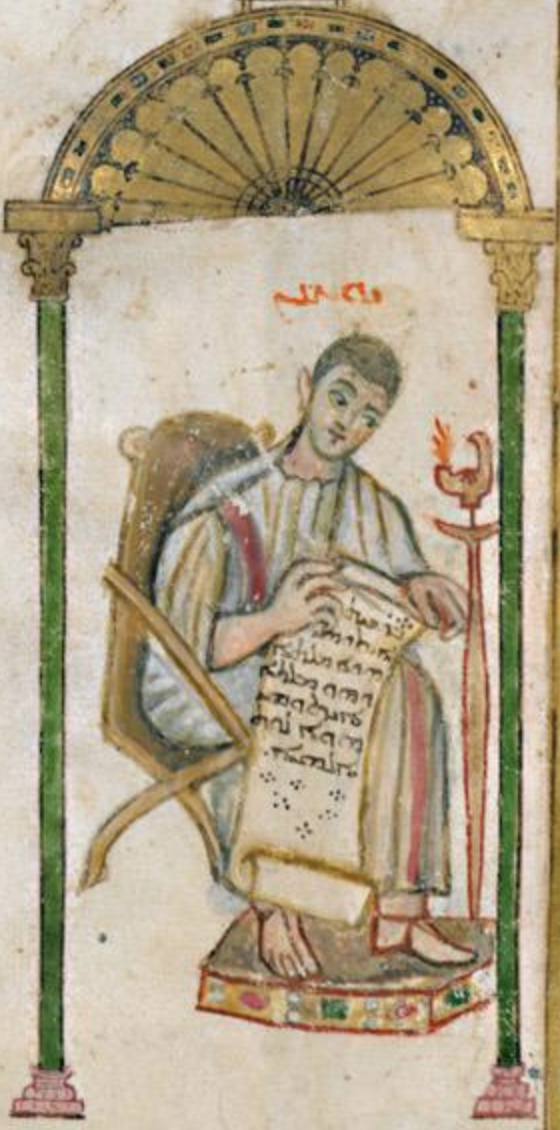
A Syriac Christian rendition of St. John the Evangelist, from the Rabbula Gospels.

=== Synoptic gospels and Pauline literature ===
The Gospel of John is significantly different from the Synoptics, with its relatively free usage of Mark lining up well with the practices of other Jewish historians and biographical authors during antiquity but contrasting with the unusually conservative adaptations found by the Synoptic authors. Paul N. Anderson has argued that the relationship between Mark and John is best understood through interfluentiality and dialectics rather than source dependence, with their parallel autonomous traditions engaging and augmenting each other to present a bi-optic view of Jesus' ministry that supports the historical reliability of the Gospels. The patterns of variation found in the gospels are typical of ancient biographies about actual people and history. The following are some examples of their differences in just one area, that of the material they include in their narratives:

Material unique to the synoptic gospels	Material unique to the fourth gospel
Narrative parables	Symbolic discourses
Logia and Chreia	Dialogues and monologues
Messianic Secret	Overt messianism
Sadducees, elders, lawyers	The "Ioudaios"
Lord's Supper	Washing of the Feet
Gospel of the Kingdom	Spiritual rebirth
Olivet Discourse	Realized eschatology of Farewell Discourse
John baptizing Jesus	John witnessing Jesus
Exorcism of demons	Raising of Lazarus
Hades and Gehenna	No mention of hell
Nativity of Jesus	"Hymn to the Word" prologue
Genealogy of Jesus	"The only-begotten god"
Temptation of Jesus	Lamb of God
Sermon on the Mount/Sermon on the Plain	Seven "I Am" declarations
Transfiguration of Jesus	Promise of the Paraclete
Ascension of Jesus	Doubting Thomas

In John the ministry of Jesus takes three years, as evidenced by references to three Passovers. Verses in the Synoptics such as Mark 14:49 and Matthew 23:37 are often viewed as hinting at a longer ministry as well, though some argue for a single year. The date of the crucifixion is different, as is the time of Jesus' anointing in Bethany and the cleansing of the Temple, which occurs in the beginning of Jesus' ministry rather than near its end. Ancient compositional practices involved chronological displacement and compression, with even reliable biographers like Plutarch displaying them.

Many incidents from John, such as the wedding in Cana, the encounter of Jesus with the Samaritan woman at the well, and the raising of Lazarus, are not paralleled in the synoptics. Scholarship has turned against positing hypothetical sources for John, with opposition to the existence of a "signs gospel" being clearly dominant in the 21st century. The gospel makes extensive use of the Jewish scriptures: John quotes from them directly, references important figures from them, and uses narratives from them as the basis for several of the discourses. The author was also familiar with non-Jewish sources: the Logos of the prologue (the Word that is with God from the beginning of creation), for example, was derived from both the Jewish concept of Lady Wisdom and from the Greek philosophers, John 6 alludes not only to the exodus but also to Greco-Roman mystery cults, and John 4 alludes to Samaritan messianic beliefs.

John lacks scenes from the Synoptics such as Jesus' baptism, Jesus' birth, the calling of the Twelve, exorcisms, parables, and the Transfiguration, as John presupposes the Synoptics and did not need to narrate every scene. John weaves elements of the Synoptic infancy narratives and appears to have been written in light of Matthew and Luke. Conversely, it includes scenes not found in the Synoptics, including Jesus turning water into wine at the wedding at Cana, the resurrection of Lazarus, Jesus washing the feet of his disciples, and multiple visits to Jerusalem.

In John, the hometown of Jesus is Nazareth; his father is Joseph, and his mother is mentioned in three passages but not named. The main concern in John is contrasting Jesus' humble beginnings with his significant status as the Son of God who comes from God the Father.

While John makes no direct mention of Jesus' baptism, he does quote John the Baptist's description of the descent of the Holy Spirit as a dove, as happens at Jesus' baptism in the Synoptics. Major synoptic speeches of Jesus are absent, including the Sermon on the Mount and the Olivet Discourse, and the exorcisms of demons are not mentioned. John does not list the Twelve Disciples and names at least one disciple, Nathanael, whose name is not found in the Synoptics. Thomas is given a personality beyond a mere name, described as "Doubting Thomas".

Jesus is identified with the Word ("Logos"), and the Word is identified with theos ("god" in Greek). According to D. A. Carson, the Synoptics make no such identification, though many scholars today concede the synoptic gospels and other New Testament texts portray Jesus as divine. In Mark, Jesus urges his disciples to keep his divinity secret, but in John he is very open in discussing it, even calling himself "I AM", the title God gives himself in Exodus at his self-revelation to Moses. In the Synoptics, the chief theme is the Kingdom of God and the Kingdom of Heaven (the latter specifically in Matthew), while John's theme is Jesus as the source of eternal life, and the Kingdom is only mentioned twice. Lindars argues that the "I am" sayings were concerned with issues of the church–synagogue debate at the time of composition. In contrast to the synoptic expectation of the Kingdom (using the term parousia, meaning "coming"), John presents a more individualistic, realized eschatology. (Note: Realized eschatology is a Christian eschatological theory popularized by C. H. Dodd (1884–1973). It holds that the eschatological passages in the New Testament do not refer to future events, but instead to the ministry of Jesus and his lasting legacy. In other words, it holds that Christian eschatological expectations have already been realized or fulfilled.)

In the Synoptics, quotations of Jesus are usually in the form of short, pithy sayings; in John, longer quotations are often given. The vocabulary is also different, and filled with theological import: in John, Jesus does not work "miracles", but "signs" that unveil his divine identity. Most scholars consider John not to contain any parables. Rather, it contains metaphorical stories or allegories, such as those of the Good Shepherd and the True Vine, in which each element corresponds to a specific person, group, or thing. Other scholars consider stories like the childbearing woman or the dying grain to be parables. (Note: See Zimmermann 2015, pp. 333–60.)

According to the Synoptics, Jesus' arrest was a reaction to the cleansing of the temple; according to John, it was triggered by the raising of Lazarus. The Pharisees, portrayed as more uniformly legalistic and opposed to Jesus in the synoptic gospels, are often portrayed as opposed to Christ in John as well, but are sometimes neutral or sympathetic to Jesus. The Pharisees are sharply divided; they frequently debate. Some, such as Nicodemus, even go so far as to be at least partially sympathetic to Jesus. This is believed to be a more accurate historical depiction of the Pharisees, who made debate one of the tenets of their belief system.

In place of the communal emphasis of the Pauline literature, John stresses the personal relationship of the individual to God.

=== Johannine literature ===
The Gospel of John and the three Johannine epistles exhibit strong resemblances in theology and style; the Book of Revelation has also been traditionally linked with these, but differs from the gospel and letters in style and even theology. The secession was over Christology, the "knowledge of Christ", or more accurately the understanding of Christ's nature, for the ones who "went out" hesitated to identify Jesus with Christ, minimising the significance of the earthly ministry and denying the salvific importance of Jesus's death on the cross. The epistles argue against this view, stressing the eternal existence of the Son of God, the salvific nature of his life and death, and the other elements of the gospel's "high" Christology. Most scholars agree that the Johannine epistles were modeled after the Gospel of John. Most scholars identify a direct literary borrowing between the prologue of the Gospel and 1 John.

=== Historical reliability ===
Jesus' teachings in the Synoptics greatly differ from those in John. Since the 19th century, scholars have agreed that the Johannine discourses are less likely to be historical than the synoptic parables, and were likely written for theological purposes; speeches in ancient historiography were composed by the historian and were thus fictitious in wording, though they aimed to capture the general sense of what was said. Nevertheless, they generally agree that John is not without historical value. Some potential points of value include early provenance for some Johannine material, topographical references for Jerusalem and Judea, Jesus' crucifixion occurring prior to the Feast of Unleavened Bread, and his arrest in the garden occurring after the accompanying deliberation of Jewish authorities.

Recent scholarship has argued for a more favourable reappraisal of the historical value of the Gospel of John and its importance for the reconstruction of the historical Jesus, based on recent archaeological and literary studies. The works of the John, Jesus, and History Seminar have contributed to the overthrow of the previous consensus that the gospel of John was of no historical value, and many scholars now see John as a source for the Historical Jesus. About 85 percent of John's content is unique to John, with 92 percent of its material having no parallels in Mark, rendering the Gospel as an independent document about the life of Jesus and surrounding events.

John's gospel is recognized among archeologists for its deep familiarity with mundane details such as the regions, distances between locations, the people, customs, Jewish practices, regional tensions, regional languages, details of crucifixion and archeological corroboration of the mundane details. Among some of the archeological discoveries that corroborate John are the Pool of Bethesda, Pool of Siloam, baptismal sites related to John the Baptist near the Jordan river, Temple Mount platform extension by King Herod, crucifixion victim, Capernaum Synagogue, the traditional house of Peter, tombs with stones on entrances, etc. Discoveries in Nazareth also corroborate details in John. The general alignment with archeological data has prompted archaeologists to consider that there is eyewitness testimony in John's gospel.

Paul N. Anderson has argued that the Gospel of John contains independent historical traditions rooted in first-hand eyewitness memories and shows realistic details that make it a valuable source for understanding Jesus rather than something to exclude from historical study. He proposed the Gospel of John represents an independent "bi-optic" tradition that developed alongside the Synoptic tradition through oral stages, offering realistic itineraries and details that complement rather than contradict the other Gospels and deserve consideration in historical research.

== Reception history ==
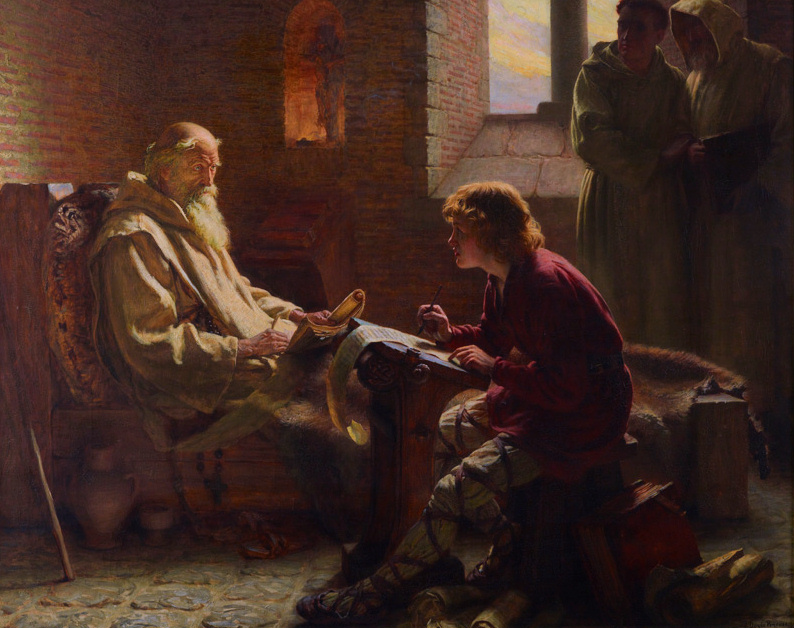
Bede translating the Gospel of John on his deathbed, by James Doyle Penrose, 1902

There is evidence John was in circulation by the early second century; the First Epistle of John, which was dependent on the gospel, was cited by Papias of Hierapolis (c. 110 AD). Papias may have known the Gospel of John itself as well and compared it to Mark, which features a significantly different chronology. Ignatius of Antioch, from the first decade of the second century, may also have known the Gospel of John. The attribution to John son of Zebedee was widespread by the mid-second century. According to Charles Hill, Justin Martyr was aware of the Gospel of John.

Augustine of Hippo and Thomas Aquinas (in addition to his Catena aurea) wrote commentaries on the Gospel of John.

The gospel has been depicted in live narrations and dramatized in productions, skits, plays, and Passion Plays, as well as in film. A 2014 film adaptation, The Gospel of John, directed by David Batty, features narration by David Harewood and Brian Cox, with Selva Rasalingam as Jesus. An earlier adaptation, the 2003 film The Gospel of John, was directed by Philip Saville and narrated by Christopher Plummer, with Henry Ian Cusick as Jesus.

Parts of the gospel have been set to music. One such setting is Steve Warner's power anthem "Come and See", written for the 20th anniversary of the Alliance for Catholic Education and including lyrical fragments taken from the Book of Signs. Additionally, some composers have made settings of the Passion as portrayed in the gospel, most notably Johann Sebastian Bach's St John Passion, although some of its verses are from Matthew.

== See also ==
- Authorship of the Johannine works
- Chronology of Jesus
- Egerton Gospel
- Farewell Discourse
- Free Grace theology
- Gospel harmony
- Last Gospel
- List of Bible verses not included in modern translations
- List of Gospels
- Reformed Christianity
- Textual variants in the Gospel of John

== Notes ==
Gospel of John Gospel
Preceded by Gospel of Luke	New Testament; Books of the Bible	Succeeded by Acts of the Apostles
