= Doctor of Sacred Theology =

Highest academic rank in Catholic Church's pontifical university system

The Doctor of Sacred Theology (Latin: Sacrae Theologiae Doctor, abbreviated STD), also sometimes known as Professor of Sacred Theology (Sacrae Theologiae Professor, abbreviated STP), is the final theological degree in the pontifical university system of the Catholic Church, being the ecclesiastical equivalent of the academic Doctor of Theology (ThD) degree.

The two terms were once used in the ancient and formerly Catholic universities of Oxford, Cambridge, and Dublin, as an alternative name for the degree of Doctor of Divinity (DD), a practice which has now been discontinued.

== Overview ==
The degree builds upon the work of the Bachelor of Sacred Theology (STB) and the Licentiate (STL). Normally, the STB is earned in three years, provided the candidate has at least two years of undergraduate study of philosophy before entering an STB program (if not, the STB will take five years; Sapientia Christiana assumes this to be the normal situation). The STL is normally earned in an additional two years, and the STD is earned after the writing, defense and publication of the doctoral dissertation (an additional 2–3 years). At institutions that offer both civil and church doctorates, the requirements of the STD will usually – although not always – be shaped so that those reading for the award can receive a Th.D. or Ph.D. in the process of meeting the requirements of the STD.

This compares with, for example in North American institutions, the four-year program for a BA at many universities, a two-year program for an MA, and the writing and successful defense of the doctoral dissertation for the Ph.D. or Th.D. (an additional 2–3 years).

A sketch of the degree cycle and requirements for ecclesiastical degrees can be found in John Paul II's apostolic constitution Sapientia Christiana.

The STD, or the Doctor of Canon Law (DCL or JCD), is the preferred qualification for teaching theology or canon law on a Catholic university faculty or for holding certain other posts of administration. In addition, the STD is usually required for a permanent post on the theology faculty of an ecclesiastical or pontifical university. However, this requirement can be waived if a teacher holds an STL. John Paul II's Sapientia Christiania notes that in the event where a doctorate is non-canonical, "the teacher will usually be required to have at least a canonical licentiate." (SC, Article 17).

In the US, although it may have more stringent entry requirements than a Ph.D. in theology, it is a research degree that is considered by the US National Science Foundation to be the equivalent of a Doctor of Philosophy. There are seven institutions in the US which offer the course.

== Professor of Sacred Theology ==
This degree has sometimes been referred to as Sacrae Theologiae Professor (STP), "Professor of Sacred Theology", even when the individuals holding it were not professors in the present-day sense of the word; this stems from the mediaeval usage of 'professor', 'doctor' and 'master' as synonymous terms for the highest degree.

== See also ==
- Academic degree
- Licentiate in Sacred Theology
- Doctor of Pastoral Theology
