= Barracks Row =

Commercial district in Washington, D.C., USA

Coordinates: 38.880436°N 76.994973°W

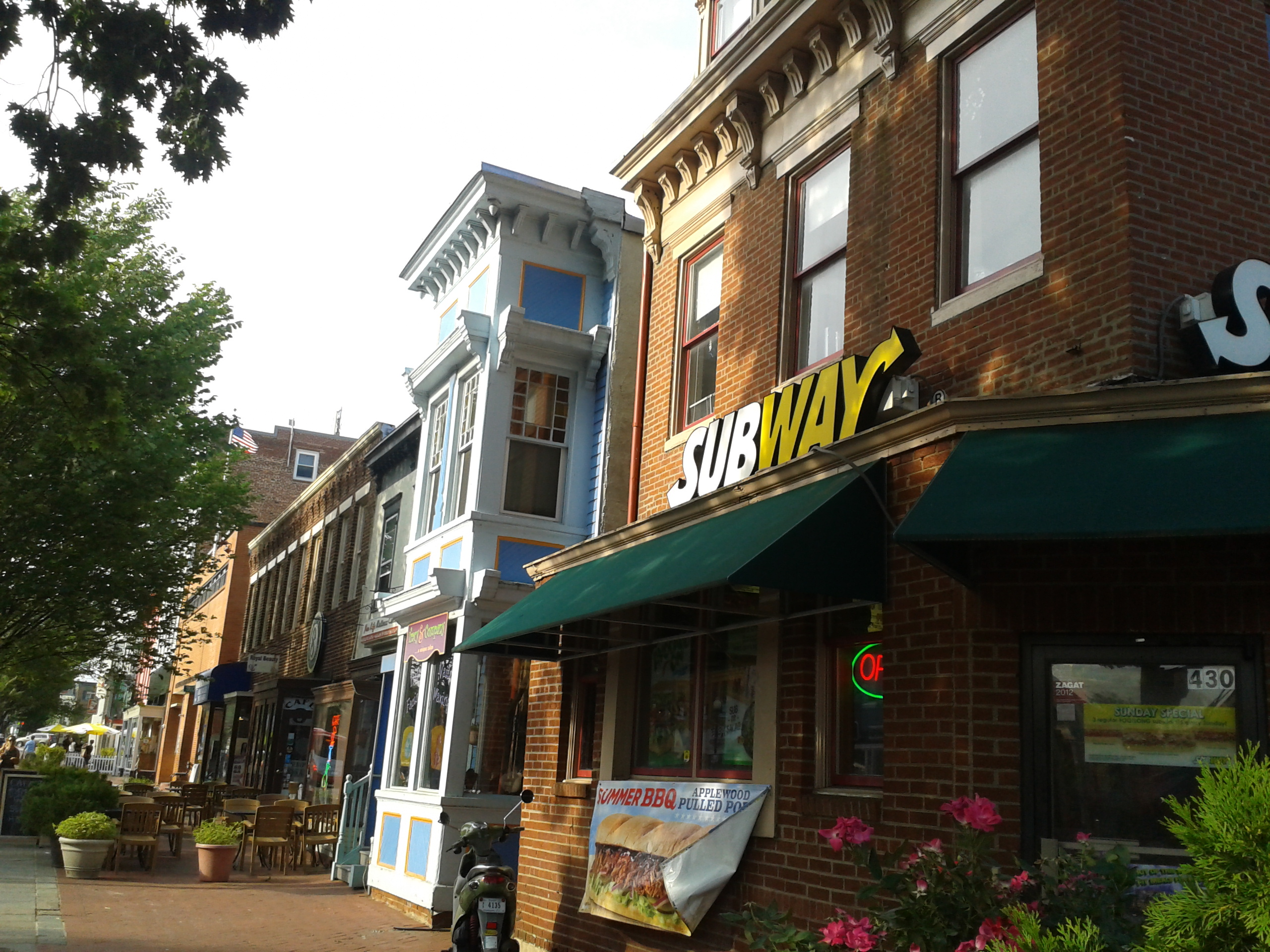
Restaurants and stores line the street along Barracks Row

Barracks Row is a commercial strip along 8th Street SE that connects the Navy Yard and Capitol Hill neighborhoods in the Southeast of Washington, D.C., south of Eastern Market, between M Street SE and Pennsylvania Avenue SE. The area takes its name from the Marine Barracks, also known as 8th & I, which it faces along 8th Street SE.

== History ==
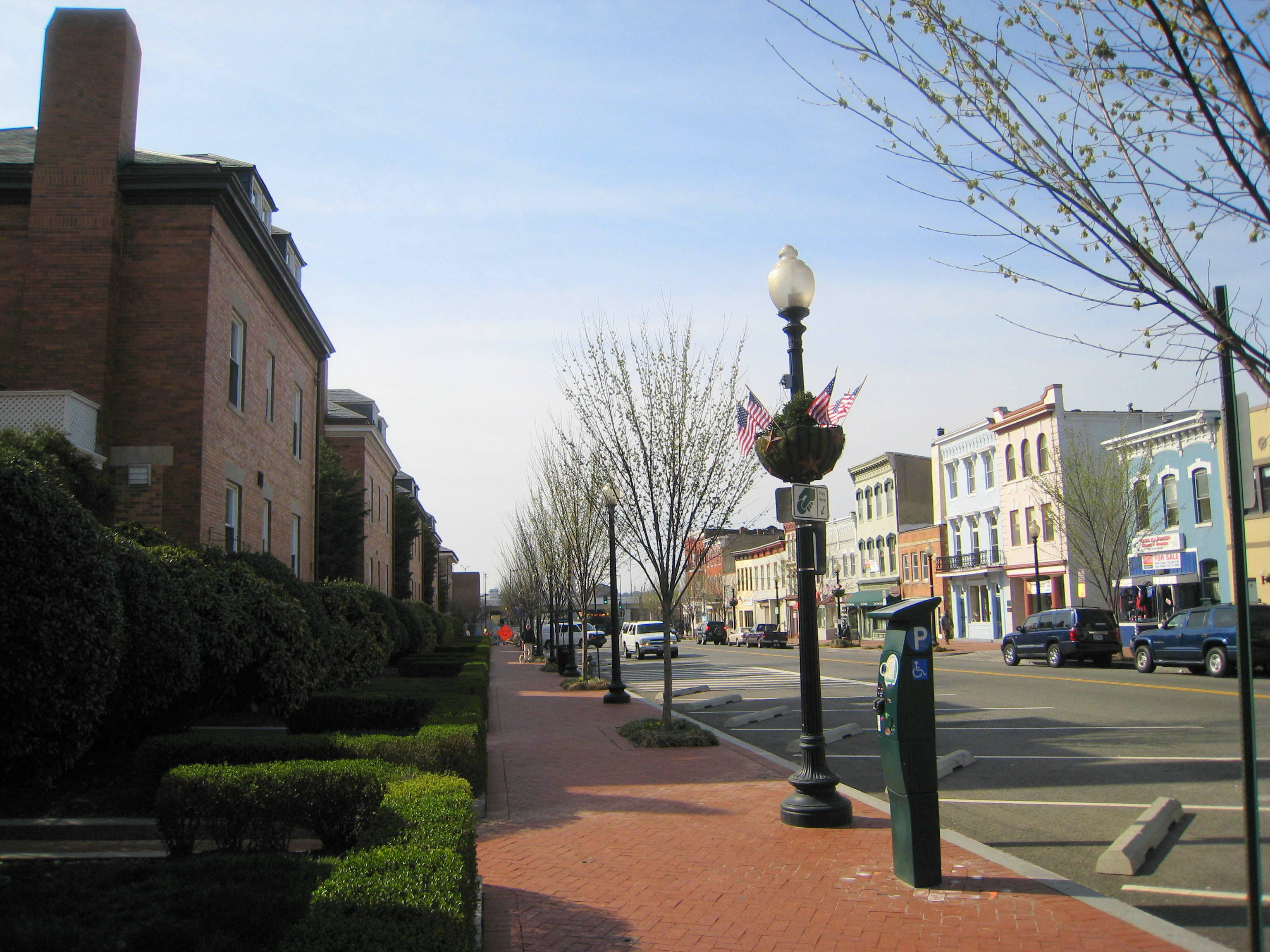
Barracks Row

Barracks Row is the oldest commercial district in the District of Columbia due to its proximity to the Washington Navy Yard, established in 1799, and the Marine Barracks, established in 1801.

Following World War II, the neighborhood entered a decades-long decline, which was hastened by the building of the Southeast Freeway in 1962, which bisected the corridor, and the 1968 race riots that followed the assassination of Martin Luther King, Jr.

In 1999, the National Trust for Historic Preservation chartered Barracks Row as a Main Street, a program dedicated to revitalizing struggling commercial districts. Since that time, the northern end of the strip nearest the Eastern Market Washington Metro station at Pennsylvania Avenue has seen a rejuvenation. However, the southern end has not experienced the same build-up, largely due to the continued existence of the Southeast Freeway, which acts as a large physical barrier to continued development. Much of this development has been spurred by Barracks Row Main Street, an organization that continues to play an active role in the neighborhood's growth.

In addition to the dining and shopping scene, Barracks Row is home to the Miracle Theatre and Capitol Hill Books, a historic book shop located in the area.
