= Paul N. Anderson =

American New Testament scholar and professor (born 1956)

Paul N. Anderson (born May 17, 1956) is an American New Testament scholar conducting research on the historical, cultural, and theological background of the Gospel of John, the historical Jesus, Quakers and Spirituality studies. He is Professor of Biblical and Quaker Studies at George Fox University since 1989 and was a founding member of the John, Jesus, and History Project at the Society of Biblical Literature (2002-2016). He also serves as Extraordinary Professor of Religion at North-West University in Potchefstroom, South Africa and has served as a visiting professor or researcher at Haverford College, Yale Divinity School, Princeton Theological Seminary, the Johannes Gutenberg University of Mainz, the Radboud University of Nijmegen, and Chapman University.

Anderson has published over 200 essays and is NT Editor at the Biblical Interpretation Series (Brill), co-editor of the Johannine Monograph Series (Wipf and Stock), and editor of the Quakers and the Discipline Series (FAHE). He edited Evangelical Friend (1990-1994) and Quaker Religious Thought (2000-2011). He has also written many articles for The Huffington Post and served on a team translating the Johannine writings for the New American Bible.

== Education ==
Anderson received a B.A. in Psychology and Christian Ministries at Malone University and pursued graduate studies at Trinity Lutheran Seminary and Portland State University. He received an MDiv from the Earlham School of Religion and a PhD from Glasgow University.

== Research and academic career ==
=== Thesis ===
Anderson's Glasgow thesis on The Christology of the Fourth Gospel (1996, 1997, 2010) found diachronic theories of John's composition insufficient in terms of stylistic, contextual, and theological evidence; and because 85% of its material is distinctive, with none of the contacts with other gospels being identical or verbatim, John's tradition is not derivative from Synoptic traditions. Anderson's monograph thus identified four sources of John's theological tensions: the dialectical thinking of the evangelist, the Jewish agency schema (Deut. 18:15-22), the dialectical Johannine situation (featuring several crises over several decades), and the rhetorical designs of the narrator. John's theological, historical, and literary riddles are unpacked more fully in Anderson's introduction to John (The Riddles of the Fourth Gospel, 2011), where his overall Johannine theory (the Dialogical Autonomy of the Fourth Gospel) is laid out as an improvement over alternative views.

=== Johannine theory ===
Anderson's overall Johannine theory builds on the views of Rudolf Bultmann, Rudolf Schnackenburg, Raymond E. Brown, Charles Kingsley Barrett, Barnabas Lindars, Peder Borgen, R. Alan Culpepper, and others, advancing three complementary paradigms. (1) In terms of composition, Anderson follows Lindars and Ashton inferring a basic two-edition theory, seeing John's first edition as the second gospel narrative constructed (ca. 80-85 CE), to which John the Elder (author of the Epistles) added the Prologue (John 1:1-18), 19:34-35, and chs. 6, 15-17, and 21) after the death of the Beloved Disciple (ca. 100 CE). (2) John's relations to the Synoptics sees John's first stages of development as reflecting an augmentation and modest correction of Mark (perhaps heard as it was narrated among the churches), thus featuring five signs of Jesus not included in Mark—filling out the picture chronologically and geographically. Given that Luke departs from Mark over six dozen times in ways that coincide with John, Anderson builds on the view of Lamar Cribbs, who argued that the Johannine tradition was known by Luke. Likewise, the Q tradition shows evidence of some Johannine features (esp. Matt. 11:27; Luke 10:22) implying some sort of contact. The Matthean and later Johannine traditions (and perhaps the pre-Markan and early Johannine traditions) reflect some sort of cross-influence (or interfluence) regarding models of church governance (with Matthew) and illustrative details (with Mark). (3) The history of the Johannine situation reflects engagements with (a) Judean religious leaders and (b) followers of John the Baptist (30-70 CE); (c) leaders of local Jewish synagogues and (d) the impending Roman imperial cult (70-85 CE); and (e) traveling docetizing ministers and (f) tensions with emerging institutional Christian leaders such as the primacy-loving Diotrephes (3 John 9-10); (g) engagements with synoptic and other gospel traditions continued from the beginning to the end of the Johannine tradition's development. These dialectical engagements within the emerging Johannine situation are largely sequential but somewhat overlapping, as issues never totally disappear but are displaced by more acute crises.

Anderson has criticized the views of New Testament scholar Hugo Mendez (University of North Carolina at Chapel Hill) who believes that the "beloved disciple" in the Gospel of John is a fictional character created by the evangelist to claim proximity with Jesus. Anderson has countered this claim, stating that the beloved disciple was an actual historical figure in Jesus's following.

=== Dehistoricization of John ===
Given the fact that John's narrative reflects a self-standing Jesus tradition, despite being theologically developed, it deserves consideration as an overlooked resource for Jesus research. Anderson's monograph on The Fourth Gospel and the Quest for Jesus (2006) lays out the case for its historical contribution alongside other gospels, and in 2002, Anderson helped found the John, Jesus, and History Project at the Society of Biblical Literature. Since then, the project has received international scholarly engagement, having published essays by over two hundred New Testament scholars. The project has published eight monographs, five of which Anderson has been a co-editor. Anderson's research has included the proposition that John has been dehistoricized in scholarship for its distinctive theological and narrative traits, which must be balanced with John's archaeologically detailed narrative and continuity with the Synoptic Gospels. This calls for a Fourth Quest for Jesus, in Anderson's view, as the first three have programmatically excluded John from the mix, and problematically so.

=== Popular work ===
Anderson has reviewed the six-part mini-series Finding Jesus and has written for the SBL's Bible Odyssey and Bible and Interpretation. Anderson also served on a team working on a new translation for the New American Bible.

== Reception ==
According to James Charlesworth (Princeton Theological Seminary), Anderson's book The Fourth Gospel and the Quest for Jesus (T&T Clark) "is more than an exhortation to include John in the study of the historical Jesus; it is a polemic against the myopic use of the Synoptics." Larry Hurtado (University of Edinburgh) has also received Anderson's work on the christology of John's Gospel in light of Johannine redaction criticism, writing that "in a recent study of unity and diversity in the Johannine presentation of Jesus, Paul Anderson has acutely and persuasively shown that such judgments reflect inaccurate readings of GJohn" but also criticizes his suggestion that the Epistles of John reflect the separation of more than one secessionist group from John's community. On Anderson's work reassessing and challenging the traditional view that the Gospel of John features anti-Semitic tendencies, R. Alan Culpepper writes that "In a tour de force Paul Anderson challenges widely held understandings of the gospel and proposes a reassessment of its relationship to its Jewish setting."

== Selected publications ==
=== Books ===
- Anatomies of the Gospels and Beyond; A Festschrift for R. Alan Culpepper (Mikeal Parsons, Elizabeth Struthers Malbon, Paul N. Anderson, eds.) Brill 2018
- The Literary Devices in John's Gospel (Paul N. Anderson and R. Alan Culpepper, eds.) Wipf and Stock 2018
- John and Judaism: A Contested Relationship in Context (Paul Anderson, Alan Culpepper eds.) Society of Biblical Literature 2017
- John, Jesus, and History, Volume 3: Glimpses of Jesus through the Johannine Lens (Paul N. Anderson, Felix Just, S.J., Tom Thatcher, eds.) Society of Biblical Literature 2016
- From Crisis to Christ: A Contextual Introduction to the New Testament Abingdon Press 2014
- Communities in Dispute: Current Scholarship on the Johannine Epistles (R. Alan Culpepper, Paul N. Anderson, eds.) Society of Biblical Literature 2014
- The Riddles of the Fourth Gospel: An Introduction to John Fortress Press 2011
- The Christology of the Fourth Gospel: Its Unity and Disunity in the Light of John 6 Wipf and Stock 2010 (3rd ed.)
- John, Jesus, and History, Volume 2: Aspects of Historicity in the Fourth Gospel (Paul N. Anderson, Felix Just, S.J., Tom Thatcher, eds.) John and Society of Biblical Literature 2009
- John, Jesus, and History, Volume 1: Critical Appraisals of Critical Views (Paul N. Anderson, Felix Just, S.J., Tom Thatcher, eds.) Society of Biblical Literature 2007
- The Fourth Gospel and the Quest for Jesus (T&T Clark 2006)

=== Articles and chapters ===
- “Encounter, Dissonance, and Dialectical Reflection in the Development of Paul’s Theology—A Cognitive-Critical Analysis,” in Anatomies of the Gospels and Beyond: Essays in Honor of R. Alan Culpepper, Mikeal Parsons, Elizabeth Struthers Malbon, and Paul N. Anderson, eds., Biblical Interpretation Series 164 (Leuven: E.J. Brill, 2018), pp. 416–33.
- “The Johannine Riddles and their Place in the Development of Trinitarian Theology,” The Bible and Early Trinitarian Theology, ed. Christopher A. Beeley and Mark E. Weedman, Studies in Early Christianity 5 (Washington DC: Catholic University Press, 2018), pp. 84–108.
- “Anti-Semitism and Religious Violence as Flawed Interpretations of the Gospel of John.” John and Judaism: A Contested Relationship in Context, R. Alan Culpepper and Paul N. Anderson, eds., Resources for Biblical Study 87 (Atlanta: SBL Press, 2017), pp. 265–311.
- “The Johannine Logos-Hymn: A Cross-Cultural Celebration of God’s Creative-Redemptive Work.” In Creation Stories in Dialogue: The Bible, Science, and Folk Traditions (Radboud Prestige Lecture Series by Alan Culpepper), R. Alan Culpepper and Jan van der Watt, eds., BINS 139 (Leiden: E.J. Brill, 2016), pp. 219–242.
- “Bakhtin’s Dialogism and the Corrective Rhetoric of the Johannine Misunderstanding Dialogue: Exposing Seven Crises in the Johannine Situation.” In Bakhtin and Genre Theory in Biblical Studies; Semeia Studies 63. Edited by Roland Boer (Atlanta: SBL Press, 2007), pp. 133–59.
- “On Guessing Points and Naming Stars—The Epistemological Origins of John’s Christological Tensions.” In The Gospel of St. John and Christian Theology (Richard Bauckham and Carl Mosser, eds.) pp. 311–45. Eerdmans 2007.
- “Aspects of Historicity in John: Implications for Archaeological and Jesus Studies.” In Jesus and Archaeology, James Charlesworth, ed. (Grand Rapids: Eerdmans, 2006), pp. 587–618.
- “Jesus Matters: A Response to Professors Borg, Powell, and Kinkel.” Quaker Religious Thought Vol. 30:4, #98 (2002): 43-54.
- “Mark and John—the Bi-Optic Gospels.” In Jesus in Johannine Tradition (ed. by Robert Fortna and Tom Thatcher), pp. 175–88. John Knox Press 2001.
- “On Jesus: Quests for Historicity, and the History of Recent Quests.” Quaker Religious Thought Vol. 29:4, #94 (2000): 5-39.(1999): 33-57.
- “The Sitz im Leben of the Johannine Bread of Life Discourse and its Evolving Context,” Critical Readings of John 6, Alan Culpepper, ed. Biblical Interpretation Supplemental Series 22 (Leiden: E. J. Brill, 1997), pp. 1–59.
- “The Cognitive Origins of John’s Christological Unity and Disunity.” Horizons in Biblical Theology; An International Dialogue 17 (1995): 1-24.
