= Doctor of Pastoral Theology =

Theological professorial degree

The Doctor of Pastoral Theology (abbreviated PThD for the Latin Pastoralis Theologiæ Doctor) is a theological professional degree geared to provide higher academic training to Christian clergy who have already entered the pastoral ministry and who seek to continue their work while pursuing further theological study.

The Doctor of Pastoral Theology (PThD) is comparable to the Doctor of Philosophy (Ph.D.) or the Doctor in Theology (Th.D.) in terms of its academic load and level of study, with a grade of research represented by its required doctoral dissertation project of up to two hundred pages. The said pre-approved dissertation is usually expected to relate and complement the doctorate candidate's ongoing field of work.

This qualification is normally studied at a Protestant institution in the US.

== Comparable Catholic qualifications ==
As with the Doctor of Sacred Theology (STD = Sacrae Theologiae Doctor) issued by the pontifical university system of the Roman Catholic Church, which builds upon the work of the Bachelor of Sacred Theology (STB) and the Licentiate of Sacred Theology (STL), the PThD also necessitates the completion of both a bachelor's degree and a Master of Arts degree in a field of ministry training. The PThD, however, is meant to enhance further the teaching, preaching, and leadership effectiveness of the current pastor/overseer of a congregational ministry, while the STD graduate is usually expected to seek the professorate in a Catholic university - see Sapientia Cristiana on Ecclesiastical Universities, Part One, Section VII, Article 50. n.1.
