= Evangel University =

Christian university in Springfield, Missouri, US

- Former name: Evangel College (1955–1998)
- Motto: "Your Calling. Our Passion."
- Type: Private university
- Established: 1955; 71 years ago
- Religious affiliation: Assemblies of God
- President: Michael Kolstad (interim)
- Faculty: 100
- Students: 2,112
- Undergraduates: 1,631
- Location: Springfield, Missouri, U.S. 37°13′15″N 93°15′49″W
- Campus: 80 acres (32.4 ha)
- Colors: Maroon and gray
- Nickname: Valor
- Sporting affiliations: NAIA – KCAC
- Website: evangel.edu

Evangel University is a private Christian university and seminary in Springfield, Missouri, United States. It is affiliated with the Assemblies of God Christian denomination which is also headquartered in Springfield. The campus sits on 80 acres (32 hectares) that were originally part of O'Reilly General Hospital.

== History ==
Evangel College (later University) was founded by the General Council of the Assemblies of God on September 1, 1955, as the first national Pentecostal school of arts and sciences. The denomination, led at the time by Ralph Riggs, already had several Bible schools, and wanted a college where students entering secular fields could study in a Pentecostal, faith-based environment.

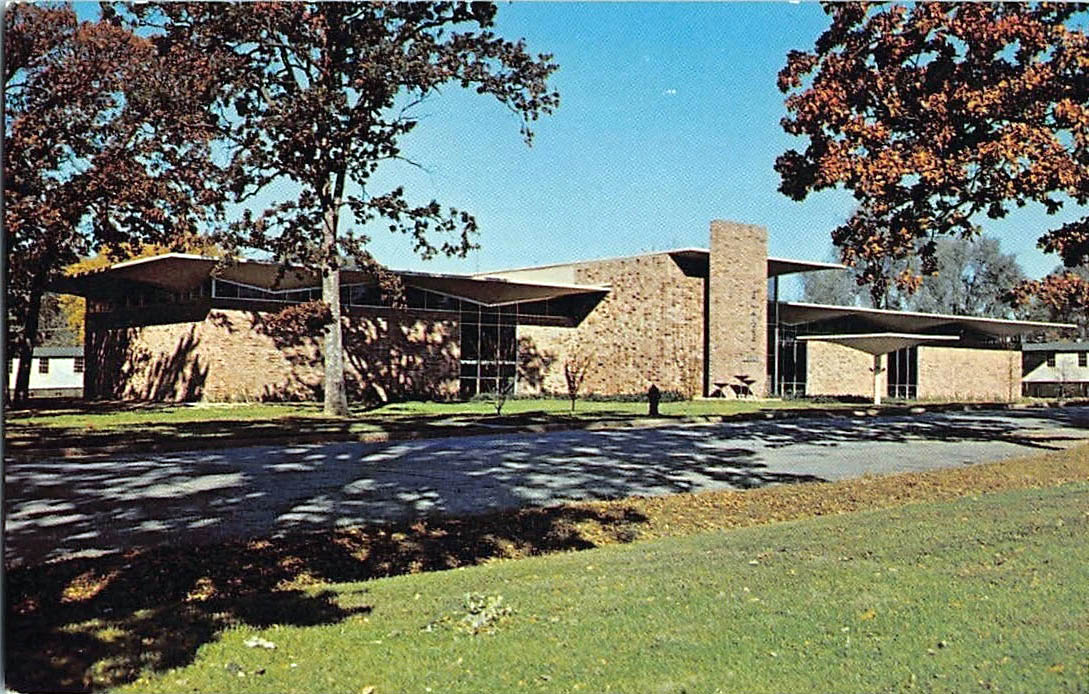
The college library on a 1960s postcard

The college was established on the property of the former O'Reilly General Hospital, which had been established during World War II by the U.S. Army. In its five-year history as an Army hospital, O'Reilly served more than 100,000 patients. After the war, it briefly served as a veteran's hospital before the Army declared it excess property. The property was acquired by the Assemblies of God in December 1954 for the use of Evangel College. The first day of classes at Evangel was September 1, 1955. There were 87 students.

Evangel students lived and went to classes in the O'Reilly barracks for years. The first permanent structure built on campus was the Klaude Kendrick Library in 1963. In the decades since, Evangel has slowly replaced the barracks with permanent structures. The last Army barrack on campus was demolished in 2009.

=== Consolidation ===
In 2010, the Assemblies of God began an effort to consolidate Evangel University with Central Bible College and Assemblies of God Theological Seminary. All three institutions were owned by the Assemblies of God and located in Springfield, Missouri. A resolution for consolidation was passed at the Assembly of God's 2011 General Council in Phoenix, Arizona, following which efforts began to make a formal proposal to the Higher Learning Commission.

The consolidation was approved by the Higher Learning Commission in April 2013, making way for the official launch of the "new" Evangel University in August 2013. With the Higher Learning Commission's approval, the Assemblies of God also announced that Carol Taylor, president of Vanguard University in Costa Mesa, CA, had been named to lead the consolidated university. Taylor is an alumnus of Evangel University and the Assembly of God Theological Seminary. Between her retirement and the appointment of Mike Rakes in 2021, former Assemblies of God General Superintendent George O. Wood served as interim president. Rakes became president of Evangel University in 2021 and resigned in 2026. Michael Kolstad replaced him as interim.

== Academics ==
Academic departments include Business, Behavioral and Social Sciences, Communication, Education, Humanities, Kinesiology, Music, Natural and Applied Sciences, and Theology and Church Ministries. In addition Evangel offers graduate degrees in social sciences, kinesiology, and education along with master's and doctoral degrees through Evangel's embedded seminary, the Assemblies of God Theological Seminary.

Evangel's School of Theology and Church Ministries was launched in 2013 to prepare students for vocational ministry. The new school was created with the 2013 consolidation of Evangel, Central Bible College, and Assemblies of God Theological Seminary. The three departments within the school are Bible & Theology, Church Ministries, and Intercultural Studies.

== Accreditation ==
Evangel University is accredited by the Higher Learning Commission, whose predecessor the North Central Association of Colleges and Schools first accredited Evangel in 1965.

Evangel also has the following specialized/programmatic accreditations:

- Assemblies of God Theological Seminary of Evangel University - Association of Theological Schools
- Education – Initial Teacher Preparation and Advanced Preparation Levels – National Council for Accreditation of Teacher Education
- Music – National Association of Schools of Music
- Social Work – Council on Social Work Education

The Missouri Department of Elementary and Secondary Education issues teaching certificates to graduates who successfully complete the Teacher Education program.

== Student life ==
Evangel University offers a range of student organizations and campus activities, including academic, cultural, and service-oriented groups.

Student life includes opportunities for involvement in campus activities, with organizations supporting leadership development, community engagement, and extracurricular interests.

The university provides on-campus housing, with most students living in residence halls. Residential life is a significant part of the student experience.

== Athletics ==
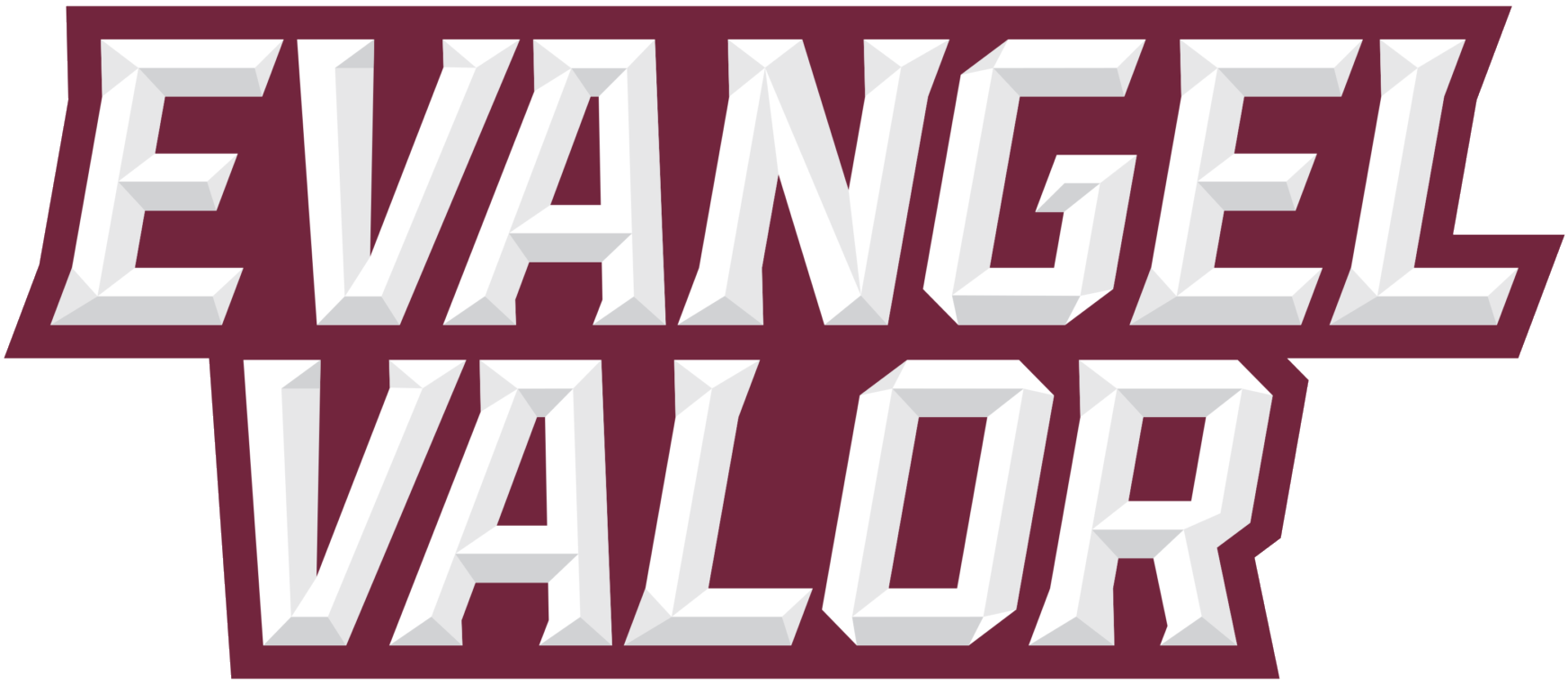
Evangel athletics wordmark

The Evangel athletic teams are called the Valor. The named was changed from the Crusaders in 2021. The university is a member of the National Association of Intercollegiate Athletics (NAIA), primarily competing in the Heart of America Athletic Conference (HAAC) from the 1987–88 academic year through the spring of 2023. In February 2022, Evangel accepted an invitation to join in the Kansas Collegiate Athletic Conference (KCAC) for all sports, effective beginning the 2023–24 academic year.

Evangel competes in 17 intercollegiate varsity sports: Men's sports include baseball, basketball, cross country, football, golf, soccer, tennis and track & field; while women's sports include basketball, cross country, golf, soccer, softball, tennis, track & field and volleyball; and co-ed sports include cheerleading.

The university offers club sports such as bass fishing, beach volleyball, bowling, CrossFit and disc golf.

=== Facilities ===
- AG Financial Arena – sports: basketball, volleyball, capacity 1,425
- Baseball Complex – capacity 1,000.
- Coryell Field – sports: football, men's and woman's soccer
- Softball Complex – capacity 1,000
- Tiger Stadium – sports: football, capacity 4,400
- Baseball/Softball Fieldhouse
- Rivercut Golf Course
- Bill and Payne Stewart Golf Course

== Notable alumni ==
- Lou Bezjak, 2-time SC Sportswriter of the Year
- Barry Corey, academic administrator and minister
- Derrick Clark, professional football player
- Vern Clark, United States Navy Admiral who was 27th Chief of Naval Operations
- Samuel Der-Yeghiayan, United States federal judge
- Richard Grenell, U.S. Ambassador to Germany and former acting Director of National Intelligence
- Tony Dollinger, professional football player
- Sara Groves, recording artist and author
- Ted Dekker, author
- Jonathan Kvanvig, philosopher
- Beverly Lewis, author
- Kristen Mattio, college basketball coach
- Troy Paino, academic administrator
- Jenna Persons-Mulicka, politician
- Todd Tiahrt, politician
- George O. Wood, former General Superintendent of the Assemblies of God
