= Assemblies of God Theological Seminary =

Pentecostal Seminary in Springfield, MO

- Motto: Empowered Ministry | Biblical Answers | Global Impact
- Type: Seminary
- Established: 1972
- Parent institution: Evangel University
- Affiliations: Assemblies of God USA
- President: Mark Hausfeld
- Faculty: 20
- Postgraduates: 323
- Location: Springfield, Missouri, USA; 37.2243°N 93.2622°W
- Website: www.agts.edu

The Assemblies of God Theological Seminary (AGTS) is a seminary located in Springfield, Missouri.

== History ==
The Assemblies of God Theological Seminary was founded in 1972. The enrollment as of Fall 2006 was 474. In 2010, the school was merged with Evangel University.

== Programs ==
As of Summer 2009, the seminary offers the Master of Divinity (M.Div.), Master of Arts (M.A.) in Counseling, Christian Ministries, Intercultural Ministries, and Theological Studies, the Doctor of Ministry (D.Min.), the Doctor of Missiology (D.Miss.), the Ph.D. in Intercultural Studies and the Ph.D. in Bible and Theology degrees.

== Accreditation ==
The seminary is accredited professionally by the Association of Theological Schools in the United States and Canada and regionally by The Higher Learning Commission of the North Central Association of Colleges and Schools to award graduate degrees.

== Notable alumni ==
- Craig S. Keener - Premier New Testament Scholar and F. M. and Ada Thompson Professor of Biblical Studies at Asbury Theological Seminary.
