= Ariston (bishop) =

Christian Bishop of Smyrna

Ariston of Smyrna Bishop of Smyrna
- Born: 1st century
- Died: 2nd century Smyrna
- Era: Apostolic Age

Ariston of Smyrna (Greek: Άριστον, Latin: Aristo Smyrnaeus), also known as Ariston the Elder (Armenian: Արիստոն էրիցու.), was an Early Christian Bishop of Smyrna (modern İzmir, Turkey), who allegedly was an eyewitness and disciple of Jesus and a companion of John the Elder.

== Personal information ==
Ariston, or Aristion, is known from early traditions (preserved by Papias of Hierapolis) as an elder from whom Papias learned apostolic traditions. Aristion is identified in Ado of Vienne (874 CE) as "one of the seventy-two disciples of Christ." Very few details are known about his life. According to a quote in The History of the Church, which was written by Eusebius, Papias wrote:

I shall not hesitate also to put into ordered form for you, along with the interpretations, everything I learned carefully in the past from the elders and noted down carefully, for the truth of which I vouch. For unlike most people I took no pleasure in those who told many different stories, but only in those who taught the truth. Nor did I take pleasure in those who reported their memory of someone else’s commandments, but only in those who reported their memory of the commandments given by the Lord to the faith and proceeding from the Truth itself. And if by chance anyone who had been in attendance on the elders arrived, I made enquiries about the words of the elders—what Andrew or Peter had said, or Philip, or Thomas, or James, or John, or Matthew, or any other of the Lord's disciples, and whatever Aristion and John the Elder, the Lord’s disciples, were saying. For I did not think that information from the books would profit me as much as information from a living and surviving voice.

Papias, then, inquired of travelers passing through Hierapolis what the surviving disciples of Jesus and the elders—those who had personally known the Twelve Apostles—were saying. One of these disciples was Aristion, and another was John the Elder, usually identified (despite Eusebius' protest) with John the Evangelist, residing in nearby Ephesus, of whom Papias was a hearer; Papias frequently cited both. From the daughters of Philip, who settled in Hierapolis, Papias learned still other traditions. This close association with John could mean that Ariston too was young during Jesus's ministry. However, his name is not mentioned in any later tradition of the seventy disciples.

== Relation to the Gospel of Mark ==
One Armenian manuscript, Matenadaran 2374 (formerly known as Etchmiadsin 229), made in 989, features a note, written between Mark 16:8 and 16:9, Ariston eritzou, that is, "By Ariston the Elder/Priest". The note implies that the authorship of the long ending of Mark would traditionally be attributed to this first century bishop. This would explain why Church Fathers like Irenaeus of Lyon already received the longer ending as a canonical part of the Gospel of Mark. Others contest this association and claim that this could well refer to Ariston of Pella or another unknown Ariston instead.
