= Patrick Murphy (surgeon) =

British Army surgeon (1843–1922)

Lt. Col. Patrick Murphy M.D., M.Ch, I.M.S.
- Born: October 1843; British Ireland
- Died: 13 September 1922 (aged 78) Smyrna
- Cause of death: Murdered by Turkish soldiers
- Allegiance: British Empire
- Branch: British Army
- Service years: 1869–1895
- Rank: Lieutenant Colonel
- Conflicts: Anglo-Egyptian War: Battle of Tell El Kebir
- Awards: Egypt Medal; Khedive's Star

Lt. Col. Patrick Murphy (October 1843 – 13 September 1922) was a British Irish army surgeon and lieutenant colonel who is known for being murdered by Kemalist Turkish soldiers while trying to prevent the rape of his servants during the Burning of Smyrna.

== Biography ==
Patrick Murphy was born in British Ireland in October 1843. He studied at University College Cork and, in 1868, he graduated from Queen's University of Ireland as a Doctor of Medicine and Magister Chirurgiae.

Murphy entered the British Indian Medical Service in 1869, served as the surgeon of the army in the Anglo-Egyptian War in 1882, particularly in the Battle of Tell El Kebir, for which he was awarded the Egypt Medal and Khedive's Bronze Star. He was promoted to Lieutenant Colonel in 1889. He retired in 1895, after which he settled in Bournabat, Smyrna and lived there as a pensioner with his wife, Helen Murphy (née McCraith) and his three daughters for the rest of his life.

== Death ==
On 13 September 1922, the Turks began systematically burning the Greek, Armenian and Western European quarters of Smyrna, whilst massacring tens of thousands of their inhabitants, as part of their campaign of violent Turkification.

Murphy was a resident of the Western European quarter. Accounts of his death vary, but all agree that he was murdered by Turkish soldiers in his home whilst trying to prevent the rape of his servants. His wife was also beaten, while his three daughters were abused and the family's house was looted.

Historian A.J. Hobbins summarizes:

There are various versions of how he met his end. The general consensus is that Turkish soldiers or irregulars entered his house for loot and with the intention of violating the servant girls. A great deal of damage was done and Murphy's family was attacked. Murphy himself had large china vases thrown at him and possibly received other wounds when he tried to protect his servants, his family, and his property. Sir Harry Lamb, borrowing two cars from the American consul, evacuated the family, but Murphy died that night.

The Times produced the following story regarding his death on 20 September 1922:

Among the refugees is the wife of Dr. Murphy. He had formerly been in the Indian service and, for many years, had been settled in Smyrna, where he was known for his philanthropy. It is said he met his death at the hands of a Russian Jew, a soldier in the Turkish Army. This man, after receiving from the doctor all the coin there was in the house and a cheque for £2000, struck him down with his sword and hurled pieces of valuable crockery at him. The soldier then commanded Mrs. Murphy to play the piano. She fled, pursued by the soldier, but was succored by an Allied patrol. The doctor was taken to hospital, where he died.

Hobbins regards this account as containing "unverifiable and improbable detail" and proceeds to cite Hortense Wood, believing that her account is more plausible. Her account narrates:

Dr. Murphy was fired at by Bashibozouks and is dying. Mrs. Murphy was horribly ill-treated, beaten, and her face covered with wounds. The girls were also ill-treated. Everything has been stolen from them—their money, their silver, all they possessed. They have taken refuge at the Lawsons’ house. I wrote all about it to Ernest, begging him to apprise the British Consul.

Sir Harry Lamb, who helped save Murphy's family, gave the following account:

Turks had entered the Murphy home and told the doctor not to be frightened, as they meant harm to no one. They had simply come to violate the women. His daughters, fortunately, had hidden themselves in a room upstairs, but the eyes of the Turks fell upon a young and pretty servant. They attempted to seize her, when she fell on her knees and threw her arms about the legs of the aged doctor and begged him to save her. The old hero tried to protect the girl insofar as his feeble strength would allow, but he was beaten over the head with muskets, kicked, and the girl torn from him by the Turks. They then proceeded to accomplish their foul purpose.

Murphy failed to save his servant from being assaulted, as he was also shot in the chest. His lung had collapsed. One of the victims later stated how, when Murphy protested he was British, the Turkish soldiers replied "First the Greeks, then the English". Murphy was Irish.

With Lamb managing to borrow two cars from the American consul, the family escaped with the help of Anglican chaplain Charles Dobson and his chaffeur, who wrapped Murphy in blankets and carried him to the English nursing home nearby. His wife and daughters were reported by Lamb to have been "nearly dying from fright". Murphy succumbed to his wounds and died on 13 September 1922.

On 28 October 1922, Murphy's obituary was published in the British Medical Journal.

== See also ==
- Chrysostomos of Smyrna, Greek Orthodox metropolitan bishop of Smyrna, also killed by a Turkish lynch mob
