= Papias of Hierapolis =

Greek Apostolic Father (c. 65–c. 140 AD)

Saint Papias of Hierapolis
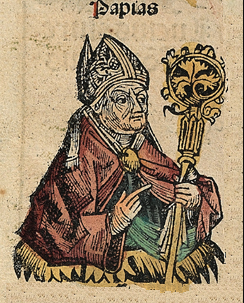
- Papias of Hierapolis from the Nuremberg Chronicle

Bishop of Hierapolis, Apostolic Father
- Born: c. 65
- Died: c. 140
- Venerated in: Roman Catholic Church; Eastern Catholic Church; Oriental Orthodox Church; Lutheranism
- Feast: February 22

Papias (Greek: Παπίας) or Papias of Hierapolis was a Greek Apostolic Father, Bishop of Hierapolis (modern Pamukkale, Turkey), and author who lived c. AD 65 – c. 140. He is mainly known for gathering oral stories about Jesus and his disciples from John the Elder and the daughters of Philip. Papias compiled these in the Exposition of the Sayings of the Lord (Greek: Λογίων Κυριακῶν Ἐξήγησις), of which brief excerpts appear in the works of Irenaeus of Lyons (c. 180) and Eusebius of Caesarea (c. 320). A scholarly consensus dates his work to around 110 AD They are considered an important early source on Christian oral tradition and especially on the origins of the canonical Gospels.

== Life ==
Although Papias's precise dates are unknown, he is traditionally born around 60–70 AD. He lived in Hierapolis, Phrygia, in Asia Minor, and flourished in the early 2nd century. The name Papias was common in the region, suggesting that he may have been a native of the area.

Much of what is known about Papias comes from later testimony and from inferences drawn from his own writings. Irenaeus, a disciple of Polycarp of Smyrna, describes him as "an ancient man", "a hearer of John [of Ephesus]", and "a companion of Polycarp". Eusebius places Papias in the same period as Ignatius of Antioch and Polycarp, and portrays him as a learned collector of early Christian tradition but a poor interpreter, especially in his millennialism.

=== Death ===
The claim that Papias died around 164 AD is based on a late and probably erroneous tradition, commonly explained as a confusion with the martyr Papylus/Papylas. Dale B. Martin places his death around 130.

== Fragments of Papias' work ==
=== Dating ===
A scholarly consensus dates Papias's five-volume work titled Expositions of the Oracles of the Lord to around 110 AD. Many scholars giving a range of 100–120, though a date of 125 or 130 remains commonly cited. William Davies and Dale Allison allows for the possibility that it was written in 100 AD or prior, and Anna M. Sitz favours an earlier date between 90–120.

Eusebius refers to Papias only in his third book, and seems to date him before the opening of his fourth book in 109. Papias himself knows several New Testament books, whose dates are themselves controversial, and was stated to be informed by John the Elder, Aristion, the daughters of Philip and others who had themselves heard the Twelve Apostles. He is also called a companion of the long-lived Polycarp (69–155), Agapius of Hierapolis dates one of his histories to the 12th year of Trajan's rule (110 AD). For all these reasons, Papias is thought to have written around the turn of the 2nd century.

=== Reconstruction of the five books ===
There are indications that the work of Papias was still extant in the late Middle Ages. Extracts appear in a number of other writings, some of which cite a book number. Eusebius made clear when he added commentary to his chapter on Papias, and once those are excluded, a core of information about Papias can be reliably ascertained; this includes the title, excerpt of Irenaeus, excerpt from Papias' preface, stories from the daughters of Philip, access to Aristion and the Elder John, contents concerning the gospels of Mark and Matthew, and Papias' usage of 1 John and 1 Peter. MacDonald proposes the following tentative reconstruction of the five books, following a presumed Matthaean order.

1. Preface and John's Preaching
  - Preface
  - Gospel origins
  - Those called children (Book 1)
2. Jesus in Galilee
  - The sinful woman
  - Paradise and the Church
  - The deaths of James and John (Book 2)
3. Jesus in Jerusalem
  - The Millennium
4. The Passion
  - Agricultural bounty in the Kingdom (Book 4)
  - The death of Judas (Book 4)
  - The fall of the angels
5. After the Resurrection
  - Barsabbas drinking poison
  - The raising of Manaem's mother

=== Sources and methods ===
In the preface of his book, he describes his way of gathering information:

But I shall not hesitate also to put down for you along with my interpretations whatsoever things I have at any time learned carefully from the elders and carefully remembered, guaranteeing their truth. For I did not, like the multitude, take pleasure in those that speak much, but in those that teach the truth; not in those that relate strange commandments, but in those that deliver the commandments given by the Lord to faith, and springing from the truth itself. If, then, any one came, who had been a follower of the elders, I questioned him in regard to the words of the elders,—what Andrew or what Peter said, or what was said by Philip, or by Thomas, or by James, or by John, or by Matthew, or by any other of the disciples of the Lord, and what things Aristion and the presbyter John, the disciples of the Lord, say. For I did not think that what was to be gotten from the books would profit me as much as what came from the living and abiding voice.

According to this passage, Papias questioned travelers passing through Hierapolis, especially surviving disciples of Jesus and the elders, who had personally known the Twelve Apostles. One of these disciples was Aristion, probably bishop of nearby Smyrna, and another was John the Elder, usually identified (despite Eusebius' protest) with John the Evangelist, who lived in nearby Ephesus and from whom Papias heard directly; Papias frequently cited both. Papias was also learned other traditions from the daughters of Philip, who had settled in Hierapolis.

There is debate over Papias' final statement in the quotation above about the "living and abiding voice." One view, common in 20th-century scholarship, holds that written sources in Papias' time were valued less than oral ones. The other argues that "living voice" was a topos, a set phrase for personal teaching and training, so that Papias was preferring direct instruction to learning from books alone.

=== Gospel origins ===
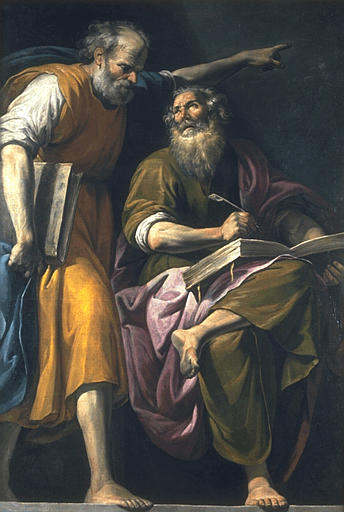
Pasqualotto, St. Mark writes his Gospel at the dictation of St. Peter, 17th century

Papias provides the earliest extant account of who wrote the Gospels. Eusebius preserves two (possibly) verbatim excerpts from Papias on the origins of the Gospels, one concerning Mark and then another concerning Matthew, as well as the First Epistle of John and the First Epistle of Peter.

On Mark, Papias cites John the Elder:

The Elder used to say: Mark, in his capacity as Peter's interpreter, wrote down accurately as many things as he recalled from memory—though not in an ordered form—of the things either said or done by the Lord. For he neither heard the Lord nor accompanied him, but later, as I said, Peter, who used to give his teachings in the form of chreiai, (Note: A chreia was a brief, useful ("χρεία" means useful) anecdote about a particular character. That is, a chreia was shorter than a narration—often as short as a single sentence—but unlike a maxim, it was attributed to a character. Usually it conformed to one of a few patterns, the most common being "On seeing..." (ἰδών or cum vidisset), "On being asked..." (ἐρωτηθείς or interrogatus), and "He said..." (ἔφη or dixit).) but had no intention of providing an ordered arrangement of the logia of the Lord. Consequently Mark did nothing wrong when he wrote down some individual items just as he related them from memory. For he made it his one concern not to omit anything he had heard or to falsify anything.

The excerpt regarding Matthew says only:

Therefore Matthew put the logia in an ordered arrangement in the Hebrew language, but each person interpreted them as best he could. (Note: Eusebius, "History of the Church" 3.39.14-17, c. 325 CE, Greek text 16: "ταῦτα μὲν οὖν ἱστόρηται τῷ Παπίᾳ περὶ τοῦ Μάρκου· περὶ δὲ τοῦ Ματθαῖου ταῦτ' εἴρηται· Ματθαῖος μὲν οὖν Ἑβραΐδι διαλέκτῳ τὰ λόγια συνετάξατο, ἡρμήνευσεν δ' αὐτὰ ὡς ἧν δυνατὸς ἕκαστος. Various English translations published, standard reference translation by Philip Schaff at CCEL: "[C]oncerning Matthew he [Papias] writes as follows: 'So then(963) Matthew wrote the oracles in the Hebrew language, and every one interpreted them as he was able.'(964)" (Online version includes footnotes 963 and 964 by Schaff).)

Immediately thereafter, Eusebius states that Papias "employed testimonies from the first epistle of John and from that of Peter likewise"; the exact meaning of this statement is ambiguous.

How to interpret these quotations from Papias has long been a matter of controversy; some scholars have doubted the Elder's supposition of Peter's involvement in Mark's composition, but his attribution of the Gospel to John Mark is largely accepted.

The word logia (λόγια)—which also appears in the title of Papias' work—is itself problematic. In non-Christian contexts, the usual meaning was oracles, but since the 19th century it has been interpreted as sayings, which sparked numerous theories about a lost "Sayings Gospel", now called Q, resembling the Gospel of Thomas. But the parallelism implies a meaning of things said or done, which suits the canonical Gospels well.

The apparent claim that Matthew wrote in Hebrew—which in Greek could refer to either Hebrew or Aramaic—is echoed by many other ancient authorities. Modern scholars have proposed numerous explanations for this assertion, in light of the prevalent view that canonical Matthew was composed in Greek and not translated from Semitic. One theory is that Matthew himself produced firstly a Semitic work and secondly a recension of that work in Greek; Josephus also claimed to write a translation of an Aramaic version of The Jewish War, though both the extant Gospel of Matthew and the War are not translations. Another is that others translated Matthew into Greek rather freely. Another is that Papias simply means "Ἑβραΐδι διαλέκτῳ" as a Hebrew style of Greek. Another view is that Papias refers to a lost work, perhaps a sayings collection or the Gospel according to the Hebrews, but this minority view is widely rejected. Others argue Papias faithfully recorded what was related to him, but misunderstood the subjects of narrations with which he was unfamiliar.

As for Mark, the difficulty has been in understanding the relationship described between Mark and Peter—whether Peter recalled from memory or Mark recalled Peter's preaching, and whether Mark translated this preaching into Greek or Latin or merely expounded on it, and if the former, publicly or just when composing the Gospel; modern scholars have explored a range of possibilities. Eusebius, as already mentioned, says that Papias also cited 1 Peter, where Peter speaks of "my son Mark", as corroboration. Within the 2nd century, this relation of Peter to Mark's Gospel is alluded to by Justin and expanded on by Clement of Alexandria.

We do not know what else Papias said about these or the other Gospels—he certainly treated John—but some see Papias as the likely unattributed source of at least two later accounts of the Gospel origins. Bauckham argues that the Muratorian Canon (c. 170) has drawn from Papias; the extant fragment, however, preserves only a few final words on Mark and then speaks about Luke and John. Hill argues that Eusebius' earlier account of the origins of the four Gospels is also drawn from Papias.

Modern scholars have debated Papias' reliability. Much discussion of Papias's comments about the Gospel of Mark and Gospel of Matthew is concerned with either showing their reliability as evidence for the origins of these Gospels or with emphasizing their apologetic character in order to discredit their reliability. Yoon-Man Park cites a modern argument that Papias's tradition was formulated to vindicate the apostolicity of Mark's Gospel, but dismisses this as an unlikely apologetic route unless the Peter-Mark connection Papias described had already been accepted with general agreement by the early church.

Eusebius had a "low esteem of Papias' intellect", but knew that Irenaeus believed Papias to be a reliable witness to original apostolic traditions. Some scholars are skeptical of Papias, though Ulrich Luz observes that Papias was temporally and geographically close to the gospels and concerned for the Jesus tradition, rendering the idea that he was completely misinformed a prejudice. Dale C. Allison notes that in Jewish antiquity less intelligent tanna were actually deemed more reliable given the bright tend to modify what they are given; Papias's alleged lack of intelligence would not have been a disqualification.

Eusebius' use of sources suggests that he himself did not always exercise the soundest of critical judgement, and his negative assessment of Papias was in all likelihood dictated simply by a distrust of chiliasm.

=== Eschatology ===
Eusebius concludes from the writings of Papias that he was a chiliast, understanding the Millennium as a literal period in which Christ will reign on Earth, and chastises Papias for his literal interpretation of figurative passages, writing that Papias "appears to have been of very limited understanding", and felt that his misunderstanding misled Irenaeus and others. According to fragments, Papias was acquainted with the Revelation of John and held it in high esteem.

Irenaeus indeed quotes the fourth book of Papias for an otherwise-unknown saying of Jesus, recounted by John the Evangelist, which Eusebius doubtless has in mind:

The Lord used to teach about those times and say: "The days will come when vines will grow, each having ten thousand shoots, and on each shoot ten thousand branches, and on each branch ten thousand twigs, and on each twig ten thousand clusters, and in each cluster ten thousand grapes, and each grape when crushed will yield twenty-five measures of wine. And when one of the saints takes hold of a cluster, another cluster will cry out, "I am better, take me, bless the Lord through me." Similarly a grain of wheat will produce ten thousand heads, and every head will have ten thousand grains, and every grain ten pounds of fine flour, white and clean. And the other fruits, seeds, and grass will produce in similar proportions, and all the animals feeding on these fruits produced by the soil will in turn become peaceful and harmonious toward one another, and fully subject to humankind. ... These things are believable to those who believe." And when Judas the traitor did not believe and asked, "How, then, will such growth be accomplished by the Lord?", the Lord said, "Those who live until those times will see."

Parallels have often been noted between this account and Jewish texts of the period such as 2 Baruch.

On the other hand, Papias is elsewhere said to have understood mystically the Hexaemeron (six days of Creation) as referring to Christ and the Church.

=== Pericope Adulterae ===
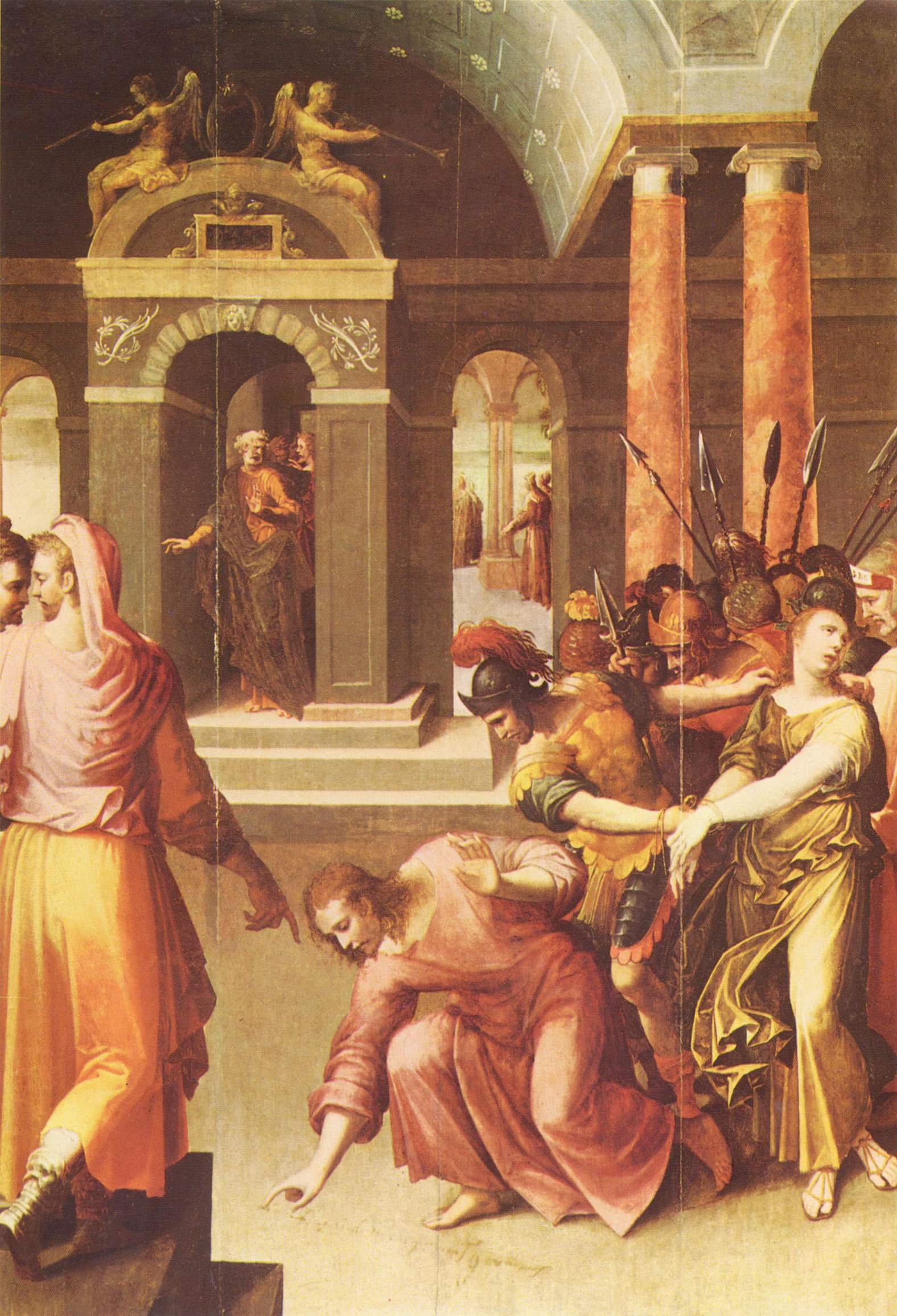
Henri Lerambert, Christ and the Adultress, 16th century

Eusebius concludes his account of Papias by saying that he relates "another account about a woman who was accused of many sins before the Lord, which is found in the Gospel according to the Hebrews". Agapius of Hierapolis (10th century) offers a fuller summary of what Papias said here, calling the woman an adulteress. The parallel is clear to the famous Pericope Adulterae (John 7:53–8:11), a problematic passage absent or relocated in many ancient Gospel manuscripts. The parallel is not exact since, in the version known to Papias, the woman "was accused of many sins", unlike the account found in the Pericope Adulterae in which her accusers simply say that she was "caught in the act of adultery." The remarkable fact is that the story is known in some form to such an ancient witness as Papias.

What is less clear is to what extent Eusebius and Agapius are reporting the words of Papias versus the form of the pericope known to them from elsewhere. A wide range of versions have come down to us, in fact. Since the passage in John is virtually unknown to the Greek patristic tradition; Eusebius has cited the only parallel he recognized, from the now-lost Gospel according to the Hebrews, which may be the version quoted by Didymus the Blind.

The nearest agreement with "many sins" actually occurs in the Johannine text of Armenian codex Matenadaran 2374 (formerly Ečmiadzin 229); this codex is also remarkable for ascribing the longer ending of Mark to "Ariston the Elder", which is often seen as connected with Papias due to Papias' reference to an "Aristion" as a source for the Expositions of the Sayings of the Lord.

=== Death of Judas ===
According to a scholium attributed to Apollinaris of Laodicea, Papias also related a tale on the grotesque fate of Judas Iscariot:

Judas did not die by hanging but lived on, having been cut down before he choked to death. Indeed, the Acts of the Apostles makes this clear: "Falling headlong he burst open in the middle and his intestines spilled out." Papias, the disciple of John, recounts this more clearly in the fourth book of the Exposition of the Sayings of the Lord, as follows: "Judas was a terrible, walking example of ungodliness in this world, his flesh so bloated that he was not able to pass through a place where a wagon passes easily, not even his bloated head by itself. For his eyelids, they say, were so swollen that he could not see the light at all, and his eyes could not be seen, even by a doctor using an optical instrument, so far had they sunk below the outer surface. His genitals appeared more loathsome and larger than anyone else's, and when he relieved himself there passed through it pus and worms from every part of his body, much to his shame. After much agony and punishment, they say, he finally died in his own place, and because of the stench the area is deserted and uninhabitable even now; in fact, to this day one cannot pass that place without holding one's nose, so great was the discharge from his body, and so far did it spread over the ground."

=== Death of John ===
Two late sources (Philip of Side and George Hamartolus) cite the second book of Papias as claiming that John was killed by the Jews. However, some modern scholars doubt the reliability of the two sources regarding Papias, while others argue that Papias did speak of John's martyrdom. According to the two sources, Papias presented this as fulfillment of the prophecy of Jesus on the martyrdom of these two brothers.

=== Barsabbas ===
Papias relates, on the authority of the daughters of Philip, an event concerning Justus Barsabbas, who according to Acts was one of two candidates proposed to join the Twelve Apostles. The summary in Eusebius tells us that he "drank a deadly poison and suffered no harm," while Philip of Side recounts that he "drank snake venom in the name of Christ when put to the test by unbelievers and was protected from all harm." The account about Justus Barsabbas is followed by a one about the resurrection of the mother of a certain Manaem. This account may be connected to a verse from the longer ending of Mark: "They will pick up snakes in their hands, and if they drink any deadly thing, it will not hurt them."

== See also ==
- Q+/Papias hypothesis

== Bibliography ==
- Holmes, Michael W. (2006). The Apostolic Fathers in English. Baker Academic. ISBN 0801031087.
- MacDonald, Dennis R. (2012). Two Shipwrecked Gospels: The Logoi of Jesus and Papias's Exposition of Logia about the Lord. Early Christianity and Its Literature. Vol. 8. Atlanta: Society of Biblical Literature. ISBN 978-1589836914.
- Shanks, Monte A. (2013). Papias and the New Testament. Eugene, Oregon: Pickwick Publications. (with the annotated English translation of the fragments, pp. 105–260).
- Norelli, Enrico (2005). Papia di Hierapolis, Esposizione degli Oracoli del Signore: I frammenti. Paoline. ISBN 8831527525.

Catholic Church Titles
| Preceded by Philip the Apostle | Bishop of Hierapolis; Before 155 | Succeeded by Abercius of Hieropolis |
