= John of Patmos =

Author of the Book of Revelation

Saint John of Patmos
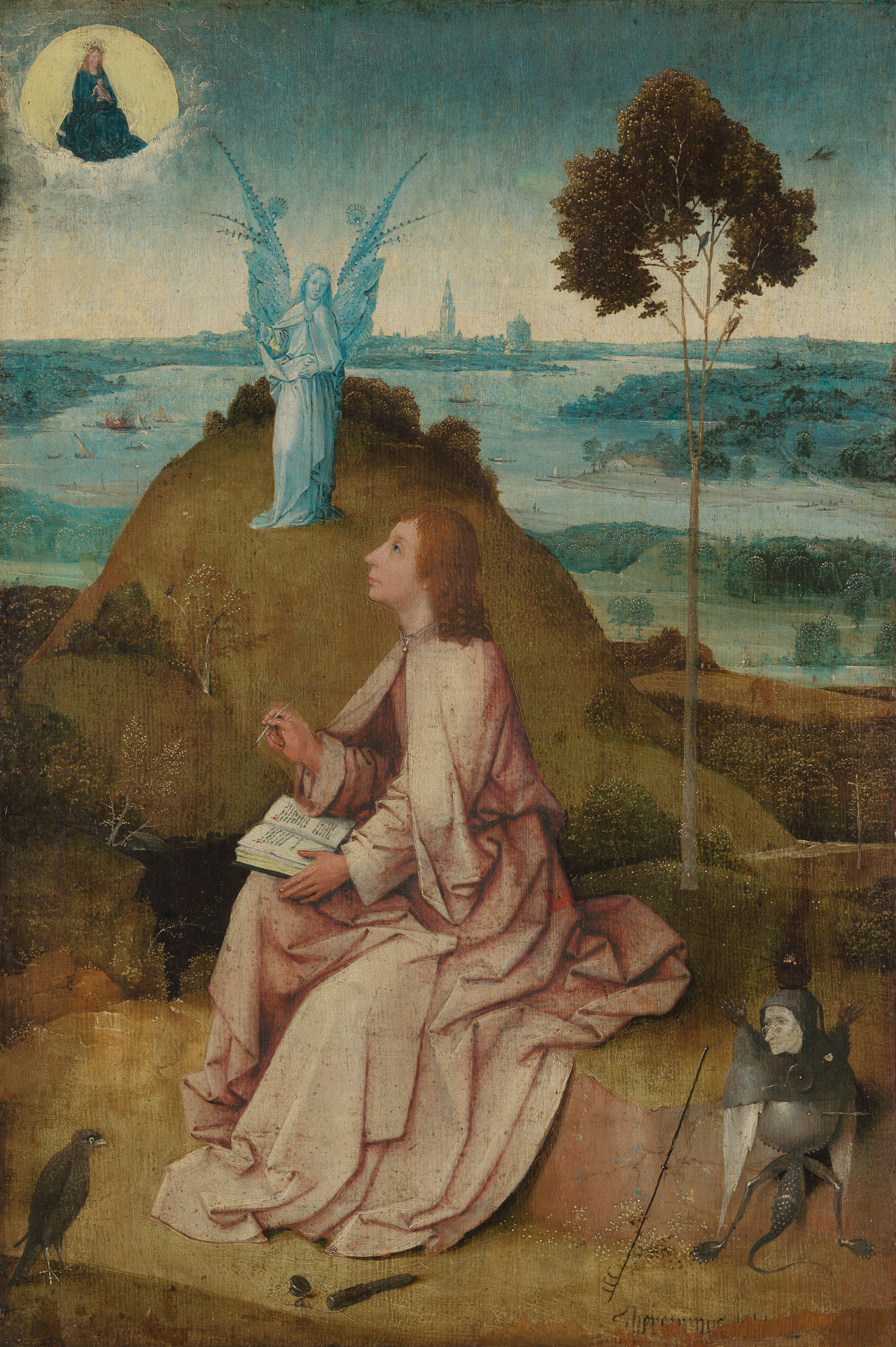
- Saint John the Evangelist on Patmos by Hieronymus Bosch, 1488
- Venerated in: Catholic Church; Eastern Orthodox Church; Anglican Communion
- Major works: Book of Revelation

John of Patmos (also called John the Revelator, John the Divine, John the Theologian; Ancient Greek: Ἰωάννης ὁ Θεολόγος, romanized: Iōannēs ho Theologos) is the name traditionally given to the author of the Book of Revelation. Revelation 1:9 states that John was on Patmos, an Aegean island off the coast of Roman Asia, where according to some biblical historians, he was exiled as a result of anti-Christian persecution under the Roman emperor Domitian.

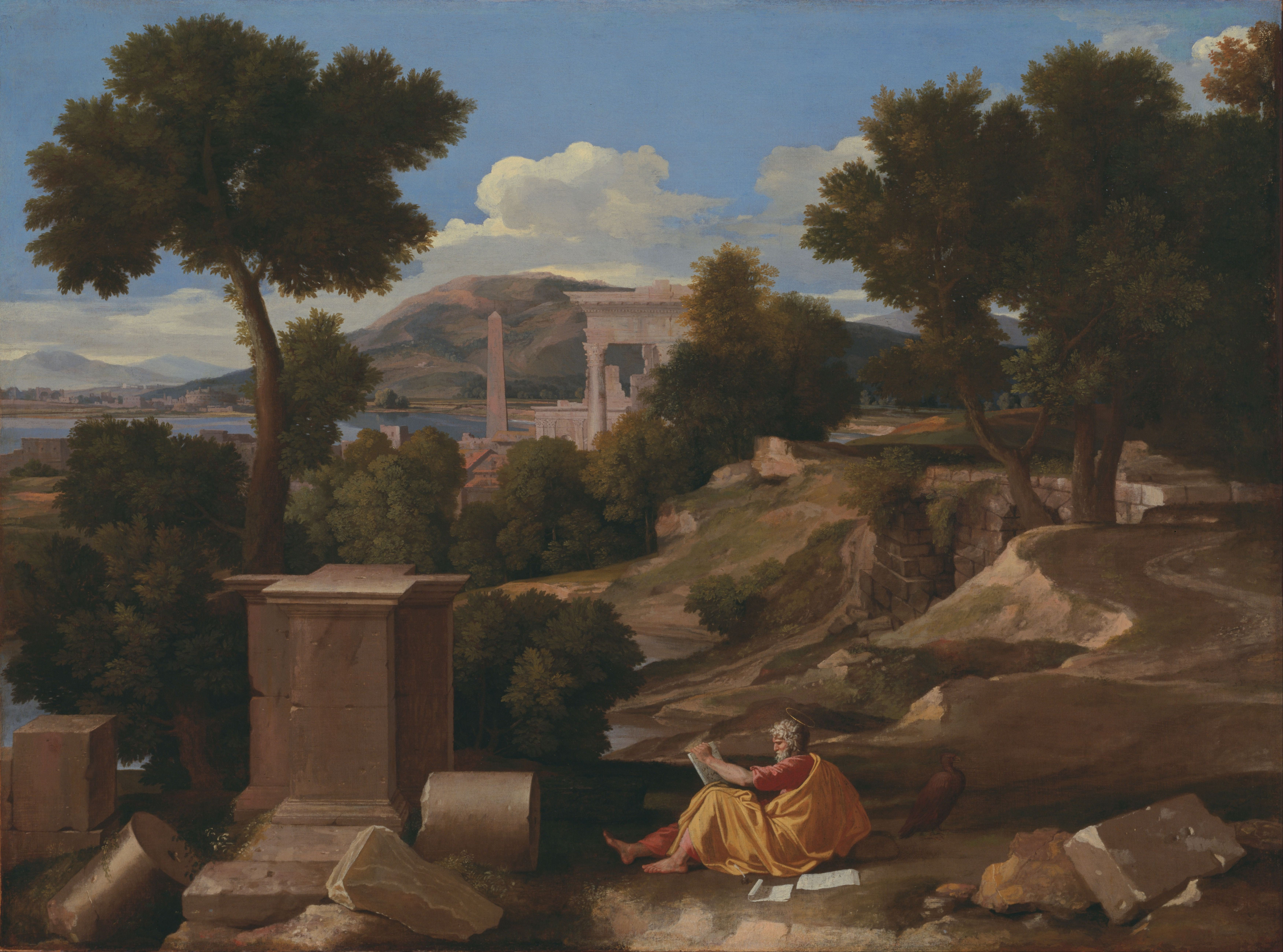
Nicolas Poussin's Landscape with Saint John on Patmos (1640)

Christian tradition has considered the Book of Revelation's writer to be the same person as John the Apostle, though some Christian scholars since medieval times have separated the disciple from the writer of Revelation. A minority of ancient clerics and scholars, such as Eusebius (d. 339/340), recognize at least one further John as a companion of Jesus, John the Presbyter.

== Island of Patmos ==
John is considered to have been exiled to Patmos during a time of persecution under the Roman rule of Domitian in the late 1st century. Revelation 1:9 states: "I, John, both your brother and companion in tribulation...was on the island that is called Patmos for the word of God and for the testimony of Jesus Christ."

Adela Yarbro Collins, a biblical scholar at Yale Divinity School, writes:

Early tradition says that John was banished to Patmos by the Roman authorities. This tradition is credible because banishment was a common punishment used during the Imperial period for a number of offenses. Among such offenses were the practices of magic and astrology. Prophecy was viewed by the Romans as belonging to the same category, whether Pagan, Jewish, or Christian. Prophecy with political implications, like that expressed by John in the Book of Revelation, would have been perceived as a threat to Roman political power and order. Three of the islands in the Sporades were places where political offenders were banished. (Pliny, Natural History 4.69–70; Tacitus, Annals 4.30)

According to Tertullian (in The Prescription of Heretics) John was banished after being plunged into boiling oil in Rome and suffering nothing from it.

== Book of Revelation ==
The author of the Book of Revelation identifies himself only as "John". Traditionally, this was often believed to be the same person as John the Apostle (John, son of Zebedee), one of the apostles of Jesus, to whom the Gospel of John was also attributed. The early-2nd-century writer Justin Martyr was the first to equate the author of Revelation with John the Evangelist.

Other early Christian writers, such as Dionysius of Alexandria and Eusebius of Caesarea, noting the differences in language and theological outlook between this work and the Gospel, discounted this possibility, and argued for the exclusion of the Book of Revelation from the canon as a result. The early Christian writer Papias appeared in his writings to distinguish between John the Evangelist and John the Elder, and many biblical scholars now contend that the latter was the author of Revelation. The majority view of modern scholarship is that the author of the Book of Revelation is not the same person as John the Apostle or John the Evangelist.

== See also ==
- Authorship of the Johannine works
- Pseudo-John
