= John the Presbyter =

Early Christian figure

John the Presbyter was an obscure figure of the early Christian Church who is either distinguished from or identified with the Apostle John and/or John of Patmos. He appears in fragments from the church father Papias of Hierapolis as one of the author's sources and is first unequivocally distinguished from the Apostle by Eusebius of Caesarea. He is frequently proposed by some as an alternative author of some or all of the Johannine books in the New Testament.

== Papias ==
John the Presbyter appears in a fragment by Papias, an early 2nd-century bishop of Hierapolis, who published an "Exposition of the Sayings of the Lord" (Greek κυριακῶν λογίων ἐξηγήσις — Kyriakôn logiôn exêgêsis) in five volumes. This work is lost but survives in fragments quoted by Irenaeus of Lyons (d. 202) and Eusebius of Caesarea (d. 339).

One of these fragments, quoted by Eusebius in his History of the Church (Book III, chapter 39), reads:

But I shall not be unwilling to put down, along with my interpretations, whatsoever instructions I received with care at any time from the elders, and stored up with care in my memory, assuring you at the same time of their truth. For I did not, like the multitude, take pleasure in those who spoke much, but in those who taught the truth; nor in those who related strange commandments, but in those who rehearsed the commandments given by the Lord to faith, and proceeding from truth itself. If, then, any one who had attended on the elders came, I asked minutely after their sayings – what Andrew or Peter said, or what was said by Philip, or by Thomas, or by James, or by John, or by Matthew, or by any other of the Lord's disciples, [and] which things Aristion and the presbyter John, the disciples of the Lord, say. For I imagined that what was to be got from books was not so profitable to me as what came from the living and abiding voice.

== Interpretation ==
The interpretation of that text consists of two basic views: one view, first voiced by Eusebius of Caesarea, distinguishes between two Johns, the Apostle and the presbyter, while the other view (first advocated by Heinrich Guericke in 1831) identifies only one John.

=== Distinction ===
The Church historian Eusebius of Caesarea, through whose quotation the above fragment survives, was the first to unequivocally distinguish a Presbyter John from the Apostle John. Accordingly, he introduced the quotation with the words:

But Papias himself in the preface to his discourses by no means declares that he was himself a hearer and eye-witness of the holy apostles, but he shows by the words which he uses that he received the doctrines of the faith from those who were their friends.

After quoting Papias, Eusebius continues:

It is worth while observing here that the name John is twice enumerated by him. The first one he mentions in connection with Peter and James and Matthew and the rest of the apostles, clearly meaning the evangelist; but the other John he mentions after an interval, and places him among others outside of the number of the apostles, putting Aristion before him, and he distinctly calls him a presbyter.
This shows that the statement of those is true, who say that there were two persons in Asia that bore the same name, and that there were two tombs in Ephesus, each of which, even to the present day, is called John's. It is important to notice this. For it is probable that it was the second, if one is not willing to admit that it was the first that saw the Revelation, which is ascribed by name to John.
And Papias, of whom we are now speaking, confesses that he received the words of the apostles from those that followed them, but says that he was himself a hearer of Aristion and the presbyter John. At least he mentions them frequently by name, and gives their traditions in his writings. These things we hope, have not been uselessly adduced by us.

Eusebius identifies John the Presbyter as a possible author of the Book of Revelation, the canonical status of which he disputed as he disagreed with its content, especially the Chiliasm implied in the "millennial kingdom".

The view of Eusebius was taken up by the Church Father Jerome in De Viris Illustribus (On Illustrious Men). In Chapter 9, which deals with the Apostle John and his writings, he ascribes to the apostle both the Gospel and the First Epistle, and continues to say the other two may have been written by either the presbyter or the apostle:

The other two [Epistles] of which the first is "The elder to the elect lady and her children" and the other "The elder unto Gaius the beloved whom I love in truth," are said to be the work of John the presbyter to the memory of whom another sepulchre is shown at Ephesus to the present day, though some think that there are two memorials of this same John the evangelist.

In Chapter 18, discussing Papias, Jerome repeats the fragment quoted above and continues:

It appears through this catalogue of names that the John who is placed among the disciples is not the same as the elder John whom he places after Aristion in his enumeration. This we say moreover because of the opinion mentioned above, where we record that it is declared by many that the last two epistles of John are the work not of the apostle but of the presbyter.

Jerome's attribution of the Second and Third Epistle of John echoes the text of these books, in which the writer refers to himself ho presbyteros, which can be translated as "the presbyter, "the elder", "the ancient", "the old", the same word used by Papias.

The Decretum Gelasianum associated with Pope Gelasius I, though of later date, follows Jerome in accepting one letter of "John the apostle" and two letters of the "other John the elder".

In modern times, the distinction was frequently revived, mainly – and quite in contrast to Eusebius' views – "to support the denial of the Apostolic origin of the Fourth Gospel", whose "beauty and richness" some scholars had difficulty in ascribing to a "fisherman from Gallilee".

=== Identification controversy ===
Much of traditional Church scholarship squarely attributed all the Johannine books of the New Testament to a single author, the Apostle John. The view expounded by Eusebius has not remained uncontested. The Catholic Encyclopedia of the early 1900s, for instance, stated that the distinction "has no historical basis". To support this view, it related four main arguments:

- The testimony of Eusebius is disputed, as his statement that Papias "was not himself a hearer and eye-witness of the holy apostles" is contradicted by a passage in Eusebius' Chronicle which expressly calls the Apostle John the teacher of Papias.
- Eusebius' interpretation might derive from his opposition to Chiliasm and the Book of Revelation. Distinguishing between two persons called John, Eusebius could downgrade that book as the work of the Presbyter instead of the Apostle and also undermine Papias' reputation as a pupil of an Apostle.
- In the fragment, Papias uses the same words - presbyter (or elder) and disciples of the Lord – both in reference to the Apostles and to the apparent 'second' John. The double occurrence of John is explained by Papias' "peculiar relationship" to John, from which he had learned some things indirectly and others directly.
- Before Eusebius there exists no statement about a second John in Asia. Especially noteworthy in this context is Irenaeus of Lyons, himself a pupil of Polycarp of Smyrna. In his book Adversus Haereses, which survives in a Latin version, Irenaeus mentions "Papias, the hearer of John, and a companion of Polycarp" (Book V, chapter 33), without indicating that this was another John than "John, the disciple of the Lord, who also had leaned upon His breast [and] did himself publish a Gospel during his residence at Ephesus in Asia" (Book III, chapter 1).

In his "Letter to Florinus", which survives as a fragment, Irenaeus speaks of "Polycarp having thus received [information] from the eye-witnesses of the Word of life" including John, and as a "blessed and apostolical presbyter". Eusebius records that Irenaeus seems to canonize the gospel, the apocalypse, and at least one epistle as the writings of the same John.
