= Chrysostomos of Smyrna =

Greek Orthodox metropolitan bishop of Smyrna

Saint Chrysostomos of Smyrna
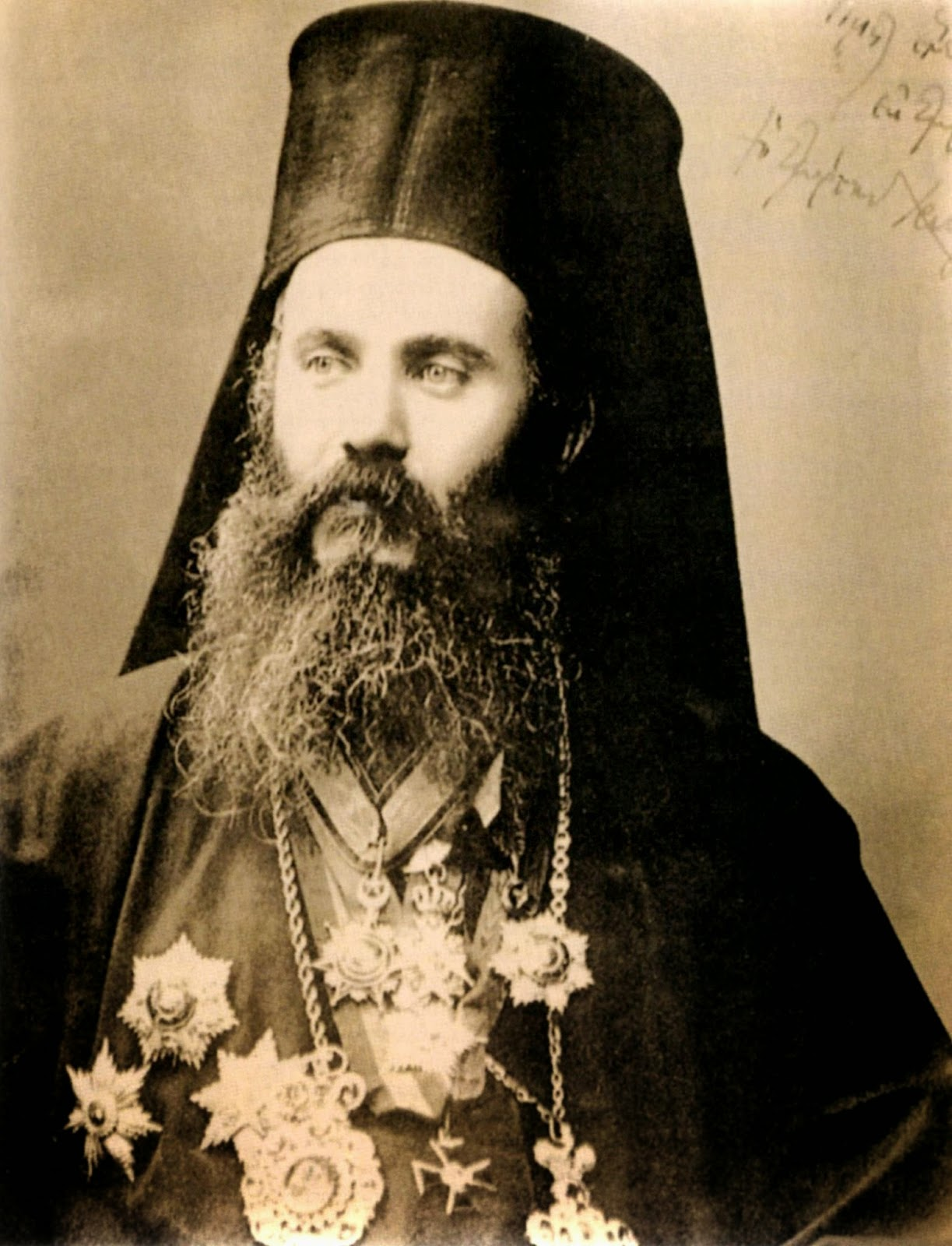
- Photograph of St. Chrysostomos of Smyrna.

New-Hieromartyr
- Born: 8 January 1867; Triglia, Bursa Vilayet, Ottoman Empire (Now Tirilye, Turkey)
- Died: September 9, 1922 (aged 55); Smyrna, Greek Zone of Smyrna (now İzmir, Turkey)
- Venerated in: Eastern Orthodox Church
- Canonized: 4 November 1992 by Church of Greece
- Feast: Sunday before the Exaltation of the Holy Cross (7-13 September)
- Attributes: Episcopal vestments, usually holding a staff or a Gospel.

Chrysostomos Kalafatis (Greek: Χρυσόστομος Καλαφάτης; 8 January 1867 – 9 September 1922), also known as Saint Chrysostomos of Smyrna, Chrysostomos of Smyrna and Metropolitan Chrysostom, was the Greek Orthodox metropolitan bishop of Smyrna (İzmir) between 1910 and 1914, and again from 1919 until his death in 1922. He was born in Triglia (today Tirilye) in the then Ottoman Empire (now part of Turkey) in 1867. He aided the Greek campaign in Smyrna in 1919 and was subsequently killed by a lynch mob after Turkish troops took back the city at the end of the Greco-Turkish War of 1919–1922. He was declared a martyr and a saint of the Eastern Orthodox Church by the Holy Synod of the Church of Greece on 4 November 1992.

== Early life ==
Kalafatis was born in Triglia (Tirilye) in 1867, one of eight children born to Nikolaos and Kalliopi Lemonidos Kalafatis. He studied at the Theological School of Halki starting at the age of 17, and after graduating served as Archdeacon to Konstantinos Valiadis, the then Metropolitan of Mytilene. Kalafatis served as chancellor and in 1902 became the Metropolitan of Drama, a city in northeastern Greece. His vocal nationalism caused the Sublime Porte to request his removal in 1907, and he eventually returned to Triglia. In 1910 Kalafatis became the Metropolitan of Smyrna.

== Smyrna ==
Kalafatis had not been in good terms with the Ottoman authorities and he was displaced in 1914. When the Hellenic Army occupied Smyrna in 1919, at the beginning of the Greco-Turkish war, Kalafatis was reinstated to his office as metropolitan bishop. Chrysostomos was on bad terms with High Commissioner Stergiadis (appointed by the Greek Prime Minister Venizelos in 1919) due to the latter's strict stance against discrimination and abuse in dealing with the local Turks, and his opposition to inflammatory nationalist rhetoric used in sermons, which he perceived as too political. US diplomat George Horton described how Stergiadis interrupted an important service at the Orthodox Cathedral in Smyrna:

Archbishop Chrysostom (he who was later murdered by the Turks) began to introduce some politics into his sermon, a thing which he was extremely prone to do. Stergiades, who was standing near him, interrupted, saying: "But I told you I didn’t want any of this."

Chrysostomos was an ardent supporter of the cause of Greek nationalism, while Stergiadis was seen by some as behaving in a perversely defeatist manner. Chrysostomos wrote to (no longer Prime Minister) Eleftherios Venizelos in 1922, as Turkish troops were approaching, and shortly before the Great Fire of Smyrna, warning that "Hellenism in Asia Minor, the Greek State and the entire Greek Nation are descending now into Hell," and partially blaming him for his appointment of Stergiadis, "an utterly deranged egotist", even though he was an ardent supporter of Venizelos.

== Lynching ==
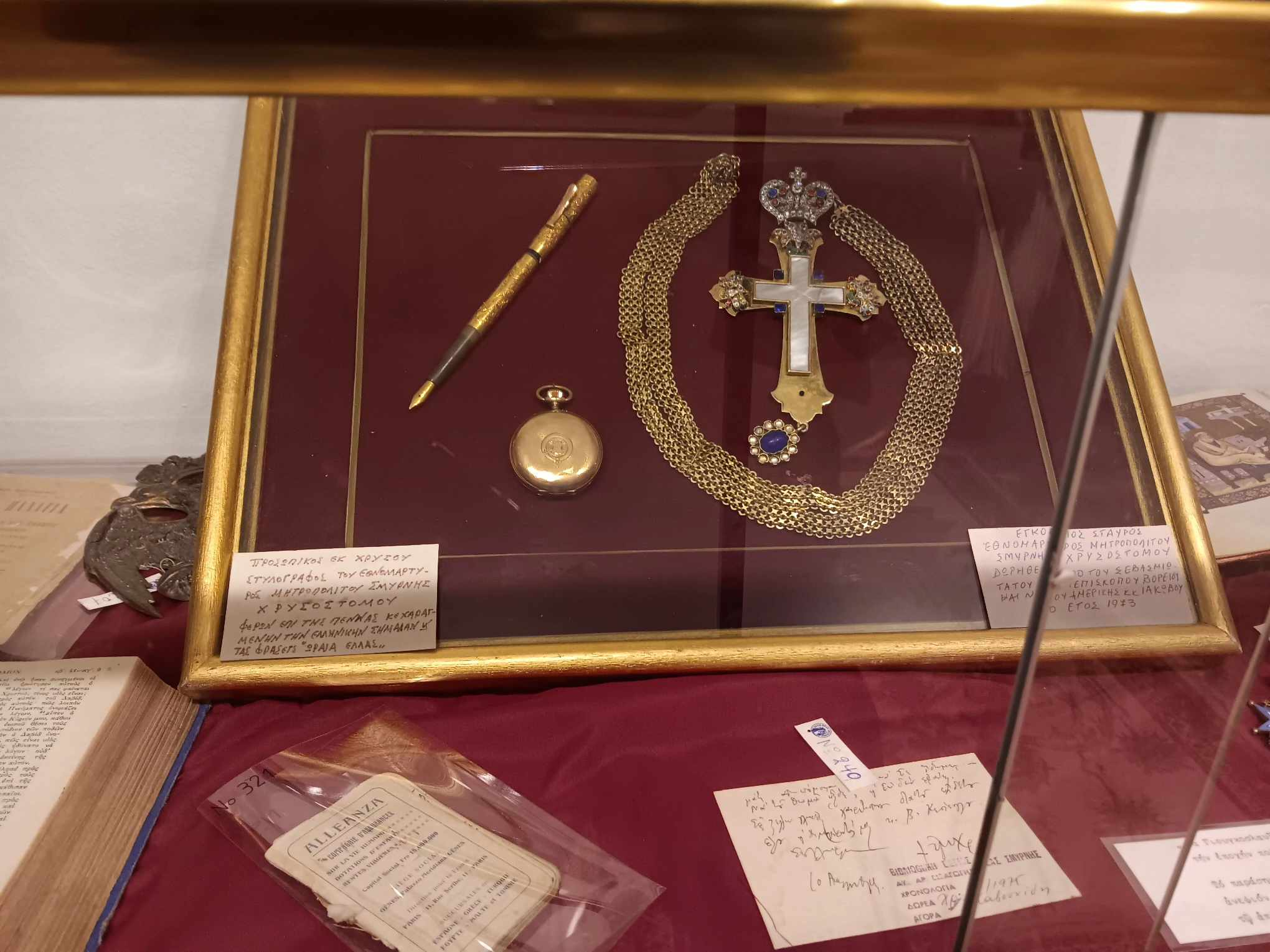
Personal items belonging to Chrysostomos of Smyrna which were recovered from his body after his lynching

After the defeat and retreat of the Hellenic Army in August 1922, Chrysostomos declined the offer to leave the city and decided to stay.

On 10 September (Julian style – 27 August) 1922, soon after the Turkish army had moved into Smyrna, a Turkish officer and two soldiers took Chrysostomos from the office of the cathedral and delivered him to the Turkish commander-in-chief, Nureddin Pasha, the general who is said to have decided to hand him over to a Turkish mob who murdered him. Horton adds that there is no sufficient proof of the veracity of this statement, yet it is certain that he was killed by the mob. Horton, who was in Smyrna at the time until the evening of 13 September 1922 just before the Burning of Smyrna, mentions that he did not witness the events and also inaccurately gives 9 September as the date of Chrysostomos death.

Fahrettin Altay who witnessed the entry of the Metropolitan and the lynching mentions in his memoirs that religious leaders of the various millets were coming to congratulate Mustafa Kemal. Chrysostomos also came to congratulate with a Greek member of the City council. Münir Kocaçıtak, the legal counsel of the cavalry side army, said; "Do not allow this priest inside without searching him first. He is a well known komitadji, he may wish to make a last sacrifice by bringing a bomb with him." He was searched by the aide-de-camp of Nureddin Pasha and squad commander of the cavalry side army Nazım from Afyon, yet nothing was found. Fahrettin Altay then went upstairs and said to Mustafa Kemal that Chrysostomos came. He jokingly said to Nureddin Pasha the following and sent him outside to meet the Metropolitan: "He is your friend! Go see him, I do not want to see him". Nureddin Pasha informed Chrysostomos that he was no longer recognized as the Metropolitan of Smyrna, that Mustafa Kemal would not receive him, and that he should appoint a deputy in his place and withdraw. After Nureddin Pasha's reply, the Metropolitan and those accompanying him began to descend the stairs. Outside the Government House, a captain among the crowd seized the Metropolitan by his long beard and accused him of having blessed those responsible for the massacre during the Greek occupation of Smyrna. He shouted, "How can a man of religion do such a thing? Is this fitting for a clergyman?", rebuked him with harsh words, and forced him to shout "Ζήτω ο Μουσταφά Κεμάλ / Zito Mustafa Kemal!" ("Long live Mustafa Kemal!"). The captain then said that Brigadier General Süleyman Fethi, despite being threatened with Greek bayonets, had refused to shout "Ζήτω ο Βενιζέλος / Zito Venizelos" and had shed his blood instead. Chrysostomos again tried to defend himself and calm the increasingly agitated crowd. However, the crowd did not stop; they surrounded him and killed him. Altay adds that he was beside Mustafa Kemal when news of Chrysostomos death reached him, and that Mustafa Kemal, saddened by the news, remarked: "This should not have happened."

According to French soldiers who witnessed the lynching, but were under strict orders from their commanding officer not to intervene:

"The mob took possession of Metropolitan Chrysostom and carried him away... A little further on, in front of an Italian hairdresser named Ismail... they stopped and the Metropolitan was slipped into a white hairdresser's overall. They began to beat him with their fists and sticks and to spit on his face. They riddled him with stabs. They tore his beard off, they gouged his eyes out, they cut off his nose and ears."

Bishop Chrysostomos was then dragged (according to some sources, by a car or truck) into a backstreet of the Iki Cheshmeli district where he died soon after. Fahrettin Altay states that Mustafa Kemal was upset and said; "This should not have happened". He adds that the Metropolitan's black staff with an ivory, Byzantine Eagle head, which he had given to the soldier at the door of the building upon his entry, disappeared. He states that it should have been put into a museum.

== Family Survivors ==
Metropolitan Chrysostomos was survived by his nephews, among whom was Ioannis Elefteriades, who witnessed the arrest and execution of his uncle. He escaped as a refugee to Lebanon, where today his grandson Michel Elefteriades is a well-known Greek-Lebanese artist and producer.

== See also ==
- Relief Committee for Greeks of Asia Minor
- Halki seminary
- Patrick Murphy (surgeon), a British Irish army surgeon and lieutenant colonel who is known for being murdered by Kemalist Turkish soldiers while trying to prevent the rape of his maids during the Burning of Smyrna
