= Landscape with Saint John on Patmos =

1640 painting by Nicolas Poussin

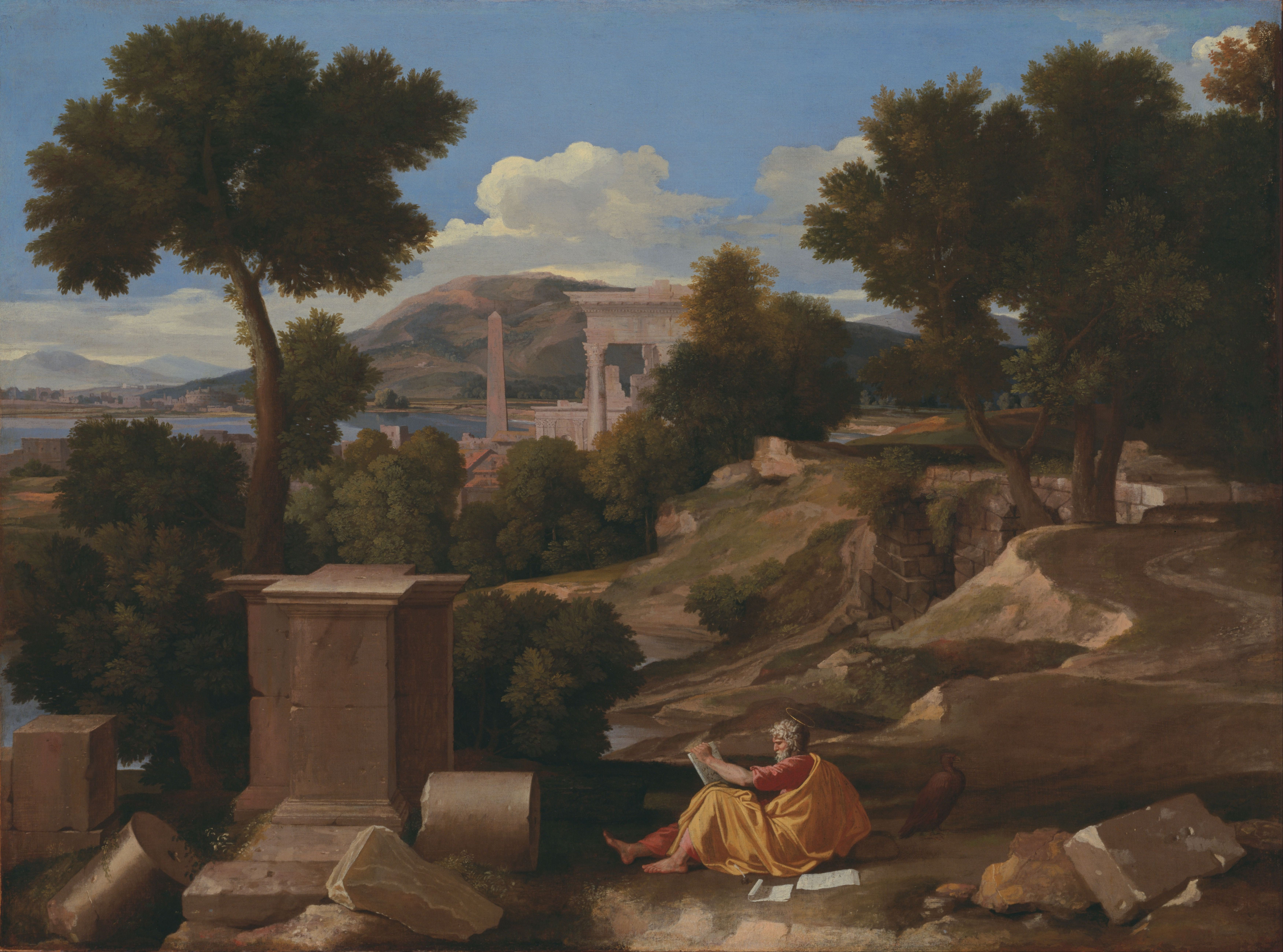
- Artist: Nicolas Poussin
- Year: 1640
- Type: Oil on Canvas
- Dimensions: 100.3 cm × 136.4 cm (39.5 in × 53.7 in)
- Location: Art Institute of Chicago, Chicago

Landscape with Saint John on Patmos (French: Paysage avec saint Jean à Patmos) is a 1640 neoclassical painting by Nicolas Poussin, now in the Art Institute of Chicago. The painting features Saint John, banished to Patmos, writing the Book of Revelation amidst a classical landscape background.

== Background ==
Nicolas Poussin is widely regarded as a proponent of the classical movement of the 17th century. In notes left unfinished before his death, Poussin described what he called 'the grand manner', paintings featuring a grand motif, and appropriate arrangement, measure, and form.

== Subject and themes ==
In Poussin's paintings, large landscapes typically dominate the canvas. Patmos is portrayed by Poussin as an open environment, showing a new world created from the old, symbolized by the ruined Greek buildings. The setting shows a sunny sky above a classical era environment. In the foreground lies Saint John, posed similarly to an Ancient Greek god. Saint John was banished to Patmos by the Roman Emperor Domitian for his Christian beliefs. Known for his visions recorded in the Book of Revelation, the painting represents the Saint recording his works. In the background there are two oak trees, an obelisk, and the ruins of an ancient temple. The decaying ancient buildings, which would often be repurposed by the Church, suggest the replacement of the old ways with Christianity. From the hills to the sky, the rest of the landscape is an imaginary setting created defying the rules of atmospheric perspective.

== Exhibition ==
The painting is part of a pair, the other depicting Saint Matthew, that was presented to Pope Urban VIII's secretary, Gian Maria Rosicoli.

== See also ==
- List of paintings by Nicolas Poussin
- The Crossing of the Red Sea (Poussin)

== Bibliography ==
=== Books ===
- Boxall, I. (2013). Patmos in the Reception History of the Apocalypse. Oxford Theology and Religion Monographs. OUP Oxford. ISBN 978-0-19-967420-6.
- Kleiner, F.S. (2015). Gardner's Art through the Ages: A Global History. Cengage Learning. ISBN 978-1-305-54487-1.
- Meskin, A.; Cook, R.T.; Ellis, W. (2012). The Art of Comics: A Philosophical Approach. New Directions in Aesthetics. Wiley. ISBN 978-1-4443-3464-7.

=== Web ===
- "Landscape with Saint John on Patmos". The Art Institute of Chicago. Archived from the original on 2018-07-06.
