= Pseudo-John =

Authors who wrote as Saints John

Pseudo-John is the name given to pseudepigraphical authors who wrote in the name of various early Christian church leaders named John to give their own works greater legitimacy. Works attributed to a Pseudo-John include:

- Works written in the name of John the Apostle or John the Evangelist:
  - Apocalypse of Pseudo-John, a pseudo-prophetic text based on the Book of Daniel 10.1-12.13,45 concerning the end of time.
  - Liber de Dormitione Mariae, an apocryphal narrative of the death of Mary (5th or 6th century)
  - Apocryphon of John, a 2nd-century Sethian text
- Works written in the name of John of Damascus, called the Pseudo-Damascene, Pseudo–John of Damascus, or Pseudo–John Damascene:
  - Epistula ad Theophilum imperatorem de sanctis et venerandis imaginibus
  - Sacra parallela
  - De iis qui in fide dormierunt (Concerning those who have died in the faith). Rejected as spurious by Francisco Suárez, Bellarmine, and Le Quien, on account of its doctrinal discrepancies and its fabulous character.
- Works written in the name of John Chrysostom, called Pseudo-Chrysostom:
  - Opus Imperfectum in Matthaeum, comments on the Gospel of Matthew ostensibly collected from secondary manuscripts.
  - The Encomium of John the Baptist, an apocryphal hagiography of John the Baptist.

The name Pseudo-John is not used for the authors of the Johannine works (the Gospel of John, the Epistles of John, and the Book of Revelation). The authors of some of these texts give their name as John, but did not write in the name of someone else.
