= Strataes =

Strataes was a 1st-century Bishop of Smyrna.

He was the second bishop of Smyrna, replacing the Biblical character Saint Apelles, and he was reputed to have been a brother of the Biblical St Timothy. Tradition holds that he was martyred.
