= Philip of Side =

5th century Christian historian

Philip of Side (Greek: Φιλίππος ό Σιδίτης; ca 380 – after 431), a historian of the early Christian church, was born at Side in Pamphylia. He wrote a Christian history of which fragments survive. For some detail he relied upon the well-known Historia Ecclesiae by Eusebius of Caesarea.

Philip may be the last writer to quote Papias, and is best known for his statement that in the second book of the latter's five book treatise, Papias reported that the Apostle John was "killed by the Jews".

He studied in Alexandria under Rhodon, and was teaching in Side about 405. Later he was a priest in Constantinople in the close circle of John Chrysostom, and he was a candidate for the patriarchate of Constantinople against Sisinnius (425), Nestorius (428), and Maximianus (431). He seems to have been the same Byzantine presbyter Philip, who was commended by Cyril of Alexandria for avoiding the company of Nestorius, whom Cyril considered heretical.

Of his numerous books only fragments remain: his history of the Christian church, and his polemic against the Emperor Julian. His style of writing was overly garrulous and cumbersome, containing some material that pertained to the matter at hand and much that didn't, rendering the text almost unreadable.
