= Metropolis of Smyrna =

Ecclesiastical territory

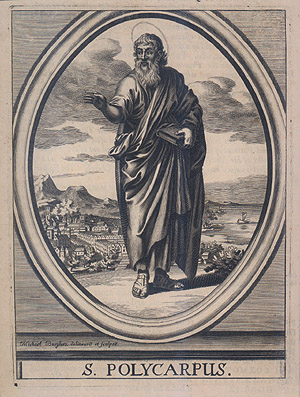
Saint Polycarp, 2nd-century bishop of Smyrna and martyr

The Metropolis of Smyrna (Greek: Μητρόπολη Σμύρνης) is an ecclesiastical territory (diocese) of the Ecumenical Patriarchate of Constantinople, modern Turkey. The Christian community of Smyrna was one of the Seven Churches of Asia, mentioned by Apostle John in the Book of Revelation. It was initially an archbishopric, but was promoted to a metropolis during the 9th century. Although the local Christian element was reduced during the 14th and 15th centuries, it retained its ecclesiastical autonomy continuously until 1922.

== History ==
=== Early Christianity and Byzantine era ===
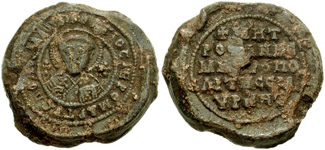
Lead seal of Metrophanes, Metropolitan of Smyrna, c. 857-879

The precise year when Christianity spread in Smyrna is unknown. It was perhaps introduced by Apostle Paul or one of his companions. By the end of the 1st century the city already hosted a small Christian community, while its first head was one named Aristion. The Church of Smyrna was also one of the Seven Churches of Asia, mentioned in the New Testament's Book of Revelation, written by John of Patmos. In ca. 110 AD, Ignatius of Antioch wrote a number of epistles among them to the people of Smyrna and its bishop, Polycarp. The latter was martyred during the middle of the 2nd century AD. After Polycarp was martyred, the next bishop of Smyrna was Papirius. Papirius was later succeeded by Camerius, Smyrna was also the place of martyrdom of Saint Pionius, during the reign of Decius.

Already from the early Christian years Smyrna was an autocephalous archbishopric as part of the wider Metropolis of Ephesus. During the 9th century the local archbishopric was promoted to a metropolis. At the time of its promotion, the diocese of Smyrna held the 39th position in the Notitiae Episcopatuum, while during the reign of Emperor Leo VI (886–912) it held the 44th position. The city was also the place of exile of the monk Theodore the Studite, who played a major role in the revivals both of Byzantine monasticism and of classical literary genres in Byzantium.

In the 13th century, the city thrived under the Empire of Nicaea, while several churches and monasteries were erected, the most notable of them being the Lembon monastery.

=== Anatolian Beyliks and Ottoman era ===
Greek Orthodox metropolises in Asia Minor, c. 1880.

Smyrna fell to the Aydinids in the early 14th century. In 1318 the new metropolitan of the city also assumed the metropolis of Chios, so that Smyrna could survive with the help of the more prosperous island. When the Crusader forces conquered Smyrna from the Turkomans in 1343, the well-being of the Christian population also improved. While in 1347 the metropolitan of Philadelphia assumed the churches of Smyrna and Phocaea, Smyrna again had its own metropolitan in 1363. The city's Christians were described as "many and countless", and around that time, Smyrna also assumed the metropolitanates of Pergamon, Klazomenai and New Phocaea.

During the 14th century, the Turkish raids and eventual capture of the city caused the local Church to decline and its territory to shrink. As a result, at the end of that century only the bishoprics of Phocaea and Magnesia were under the jurisdiction of the metropolis. Moreover, there are no surviving records of a local metropolitan after 1389. In December 1402 Smyrna was razed by the army of Timur. However, it appears that the Christian community survived the devastation of the city.

After the Ottoman conquest of Smyrna, it appears that the local Christians enjoyed a special status, contrary to several adjacent metropolises that became inactive, while with the Fall of Constantinople (1453) to the Ottomans, a major reorganization occurred in the ecclesiastical administration following the incorporation of the Ecumenical Patriarchate into the social structures of the Ottoman Empire. Thus, although Christianity in Anatolia was in steady decline during that period, the diocese of Smyrna survived, even in a restricted area of jurisdiction and managed to retain its status as a metropolis of the Orthodox Church.

During the 17th and 18th centuries a significant number of local saints (new martyrs) are recorded in the city, where most of them rejected conversion to Islam and were tortured by the Muslim authorities. At that period the Christian community increased enormously, due to the general demographic boom of the region, as a result of the commercial development of Smyrna. The city became a center of the Greek Enlightenment culture, while several schools were erected, like the Evangelical School and the Philological Gymnasion. On the other hand, the local leadership of the Church was suspicious of progressive ideas, especially in education and supported a more traditional educational system.

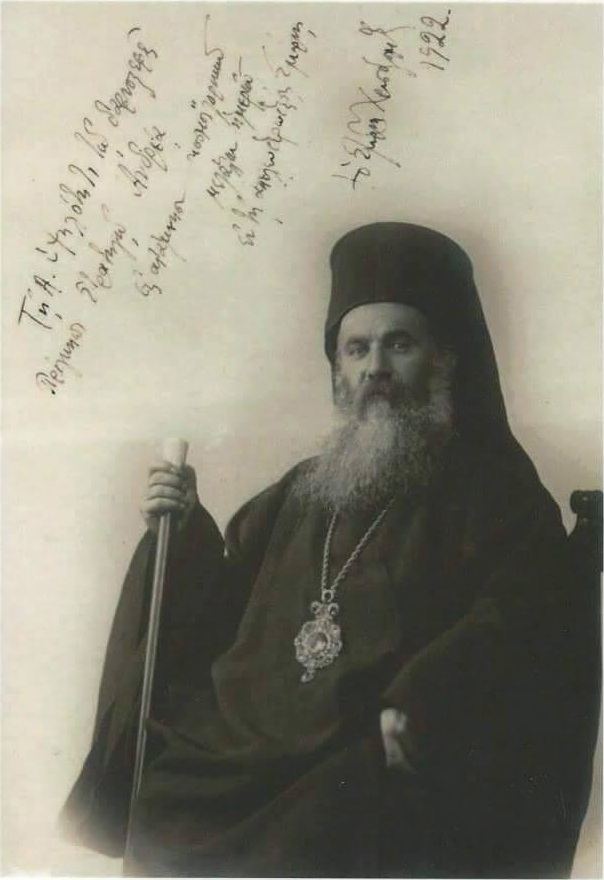
Chrysostomos of Smyrna, new martyr and last metropolitan of Smyrna

In 1907, the administrative model of the local Greek Orthodox community still retained the traditional communal authorities of the Church and the Council of Elders (Greek: Δημογεροντία), but power was in fact exercised by a new body, the Central Committee, which comprised not only Ottoman Greeks but also citizens of the independent Greek kingdom. Nevertheless, according to this model the metropolitan of Smyrna retained an essential role and represented both the Church and the Orthodox community of Smyrna in all their external affairs and supervised it together with the Council of Elders and the Central Committee. The significant role of the Church authorities became more evident in the activity of metropolitan Chrysostomos, especially in the promotion of Greek nationalism among the Smyrniote Greeks.

Orthodox Christianity in Smyrna ended as a result of the Greco-Turkish War of 1919–1922. In September 1922, during the events of the Great Fire of Smyrna, thousands of civilians lost their lives and the survivors found refuge in Greece. It is estimated that of a total of 459 priests and bishops of the metropolis of Smyrna, 347 of them were murdered by the Turkish army. Among them was also the metropolitan, Chrysostomos.

=== Since 2016 ===
In the mid-2010s, several Greek churches in İzmir were renovated by the municipal authorities and opened for occasional service.

On 29 August 2016, the Holy Synod of the Ecumenical Patriarchate of Constantinople elected the elder Bartholomew Samaras as Metropolitan of Smyrna.

== Religious monuments ==
According to 17th-century traveler accounts, the main Christian sites of interest in Smyrna, were the ministry of Apostle John, the tomb of Saint Polycarp, as well as the place of his martyrdom. However, the remains of the Roman stadium where he was martyred were demolished by an Ottoman vizier in 1675 and in modern times the site was built over. Today, the only surviving place in memory of Saint Polycarp is a cave where, according to the tradition, he was tortured.

Currently the municipality of İzmir has started a study to re-construct the ancient stadium on the skirts of Mount Pagos. Moreover, it also opened the former Saint Voukolos Church in the Basmane district as a Greek Orthodox church (2016).

== Notable religious personalities ==
=== Early bishops ===
- Apelles
- Strataes, brother (or uncle) of Timothy
- Ariston
- Bucolus
- Polycarp
- Papirius
- Camerius
- Eudaemon

=== Martyrs of the Roman era ===
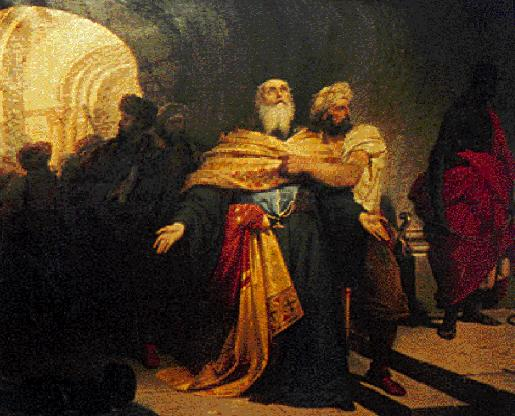
Ecumenical Patriarch Gregory V, was the metropolitan of Smyrna (1785-1797), before ascending to the Patriarchal throne.

- Strataes
- Bucolus
- Papirius
- Camerius
- Eudaemon
- Polycarp
- Thrasea
- Eumenia
- Pothinus and Irenaeus of Lyons
- Dioscurides
- Pionius

=== New martyrs of the Ottoman era ===
- Nicholas of Karaman
- Dioscurus of Smyrna
- Demus of Smyrna
- Alexander of Salonica
- Procopius the new martyr
- Agathangelus the new martyr
- Nektarius the new martyr
- Patriarch Gregory V of Constantinople, metropolitan bishop of Smyrna (1785-1797)
- Chrysostomos of Smyrna

=== Μodern times ===
- Bartholomew of Smyrna (2016–)

== See also ==
- Roman Catholic Archdiocese of İzmir

== Sources ==
- Ascough, Richard S. (2006). Religious Rivalries and the Struggle for Success in Sardis and Smyrna. Waterloo: Wilfrid Laurier University Press. ISBN 9780889209244.
- Jonsson, David J. (2005). The clash of ideologies: the making of the Christian and Islamic worlds. [Longwood, Fla.]: Xulon Press. ISBN 9781597810395.
- Kiminas, Demetrius (2009). The Ecumenical Patriarchate. Wildside Press LLC. ISBN 9781434458766.
- Terezakis, Yorgos. "Diocese of Smyrna". Εγκυκλοπαίδεια Μείζονος Ελληνισμού, Μ. Ασία.
