= Barsabbas =

Barsabbas or Barsabas is a surname used in the Acts of the Apostles, to refer to two persons:

- Joseph called Barsabbas, who was surnamed Justus. He was a candidate to fill the vacancy among the Twelve Apostles. Acts 1:23
- Judas Barsabbas, an emissary of the Church of Jerusalem to the Church at Antioch. Acts 15:22

The name denotes either

- a literal son of a man called Sabbas
- a symbolic name, meaning son of sabbath or rest, or of return

== See also ==
- Barshabba
- Barsabias
