= John 1:35 =

- ← 1:34 1:36 →
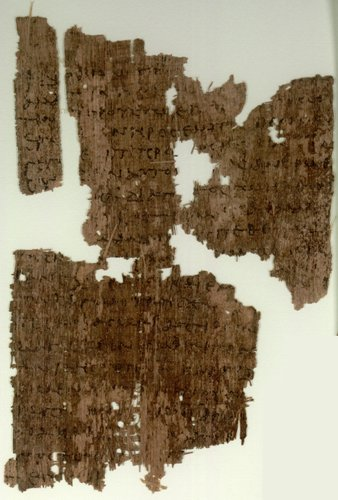
- John 1:29–35 on Papyrus 106, written in the 3rd century.
- Book: Gospel of John
- Christian Bible part: New Testament

John 1:35 is the 35th verse in the first chapter of the Gospel of John in the New Testament of the Christian Bible.

== Content ==
In the original Greek according to Westcott-Hort this verse is:

Τῇ ἐπαύριον πάλιν εἱστήκει ὁ Ἰωάννης, καὶ ἐκ τῶν μαθητῶν αὐτοῦ δύο·

In the King James Version of the Bible, the text reads:

Again the next day after John stood, and two of his disciples;

The New International Version translates the passage as:

The next day John was there again with two of his disciples.

== Analysis ==
The writer of the gospel divides the events of verses 19 to 50 into four 'days': the day (or period) when the Jerusalem delegation met John to enquire into his identity and purpose (John 1:19-28) is followed by John seeing Jesus coming towards him "the next day" in verse 29, and on "the next day again", he directs his own disciples towards following Jesus (John 1:35-37). A fourth 'day' follows (John 1:43) on which Jesus wanted to go to Galilee and invited Philip to follow him.

In this verse, "the next day" appears to imply that St. John is saying that John the Baptist bore witness to Jesus, that he was the Christ, on three consecutive days. Cornelius a Lapide summarizes these three witnesses: 1) he gave a judicial witness, when he was asked by the Jewish messengers, 2) on the day following, which was March 2, and 3) before his own disciples, so that he might cause them to go from himself to Jesus. It appears that two of the disciples were especially singled out as having particularly close communication with John. One of these disciples is identified in verse 40 as St. Andrew. Alfred Plummer suggests that "the other was no doubt St. John himself".

== Commentary from the Church Fathers ==
Thomas Aquinas assembled the following quotations regarding this verse from the early Fathers of the Church:

- Bede: "John stood, because he had ascended that citadel of all excellences, from which no temptations could cast him down: his disciples stood with him, as stout-hearted followers of their master."
- Chrysostom: "Many not having attended to John's words at first, he rouses them a second time: Again the next day after John stood, and two of his disciples."
- Also: "But wherefore went he not all about, preaching in every place of Judæa; instead of standing near the river, waiting for His coming, that he might point Him out? Because he wished this to be done by the works of Christ Himself. And observe how much greater an effort was produced; He struck a small spark, and suddenly it rose into a flame. Again, if John had gone about and preached, it would have seemed like human partiality, and great suspicion would have been excited. Now the Prophets and Apostles all preached Christ absent; the former before His appearance in the flesh, the latter after His assumption. But He was to be pointed out by the eye, not by the voice only; and therefore it follows: And looking upon Jesus us He walked, he saith, Behold the Lamb of God!"

Preceded by John 1:34	Gospel of John; Chapter 1	Succeeded by John 1:36
