= Alphaeus =

Biblical character, father of two Apostles

- Ἀλφαῖος
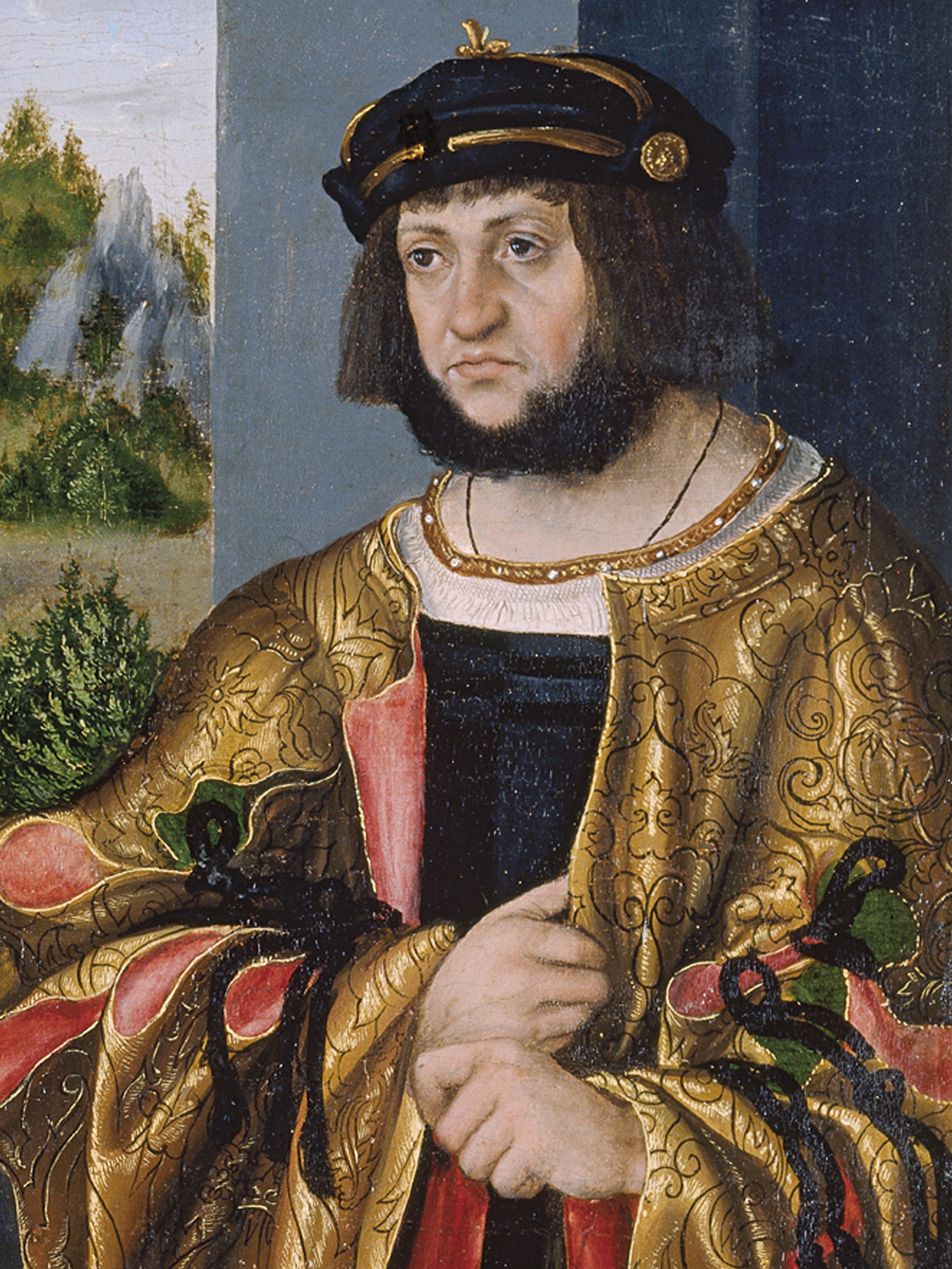
- Detail from Torgauer Altar by Lucas Cranach the Elder, 1509
- Spouse: Mary, mother of James
- Children: James; Matthew

Alphaeus (/ælˈfiːəs/; Ancient Greek: Ἀλφαῖος, romanized: Alphaios) is a man mentioned in the New Testament seemingly as the father of two of the Twelve Apostles: Matthew the Evangelist and James, son of Alphaeus. However, Mark 2:14 in Codex Bezae uses the name Levi rather than Matthew. It is therefore highly probable that the Alphaeus mentioned in the names "James son of Alphaeus" and "Levi son of Alphaeus" are the same person called Alphaeus.

He is implied to be the father of Joseph or Joses, and in Church tradition he is the father of Abercius and Helena.

== Identity ==
=== Identification with Matthew and James the Less ===
Usually, in the Western Catholic tradition, there are believed to be two men named Alphaeus. One of them was the father of the apostle James and the other the father of Matthew (Levi). Though both Matthew and James are described as being the "son of Alphaeus," there is no Biblical account of the two being called brothers, even in the same context where John and James or Peter and Andrew are described as being brothers. Despite this, Eastern Church tradition typically states that Matthew and James were brothers. The apocryphal Gospel of Peter also refers to Levi as the son of Alphaeus.

=== Identification with Clopas ===
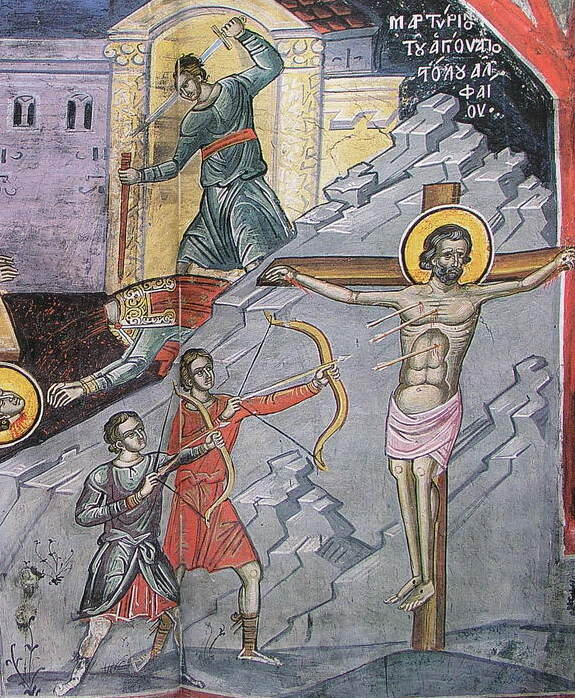
Fresco from Dionysiou Monastery

In the Middle Ages, Alphaeus was said to be the husband of Mary the daughter of Clopas. More recently, Alphaeus has been identified with Clopas, based on the identification from parallel Gospel accounts of Mary, the mother of James (the third woman with Mary Magdalene and Salome, wife of Zebedee beside the cross in Matthew) with Mary of Clopas, the third woman in John's account. Post-medieval scholars and translators often take the name 'Mary of Clopas' to mean Mary was the wife of Clopas, not his daughter. Mary is called the wife of Cleophas in the King James Version.

According to the surviving fragments of the work Exposition of the Sayings of the Lord of the Apostolic Father Papias of Hierapolis, who lived c. 70–163 AD, Cleophas and Alphaeus are the same person: "Mary the wife of Cleophas or Alphaeus, who was the mother of James the bishop and apostle, and of Simon and Thaddeus, and of one Joseph" According to the Anglican theologian J.B. Lightfoot this fragment quoted above is spurious.

The Catholic Encyclopedia suggests that etymologically, the names Clopas and Alphaeus are different, but that they could still be the same person. Other sources propose that Alphaeus, Clophas and Cleophas are variant attempts to render the Aramaic H in Aramaic Hilfai into Greek as aspirated, or K.
