= Mary, mother of James =

Biblical figure

Saint Mary, mother of James
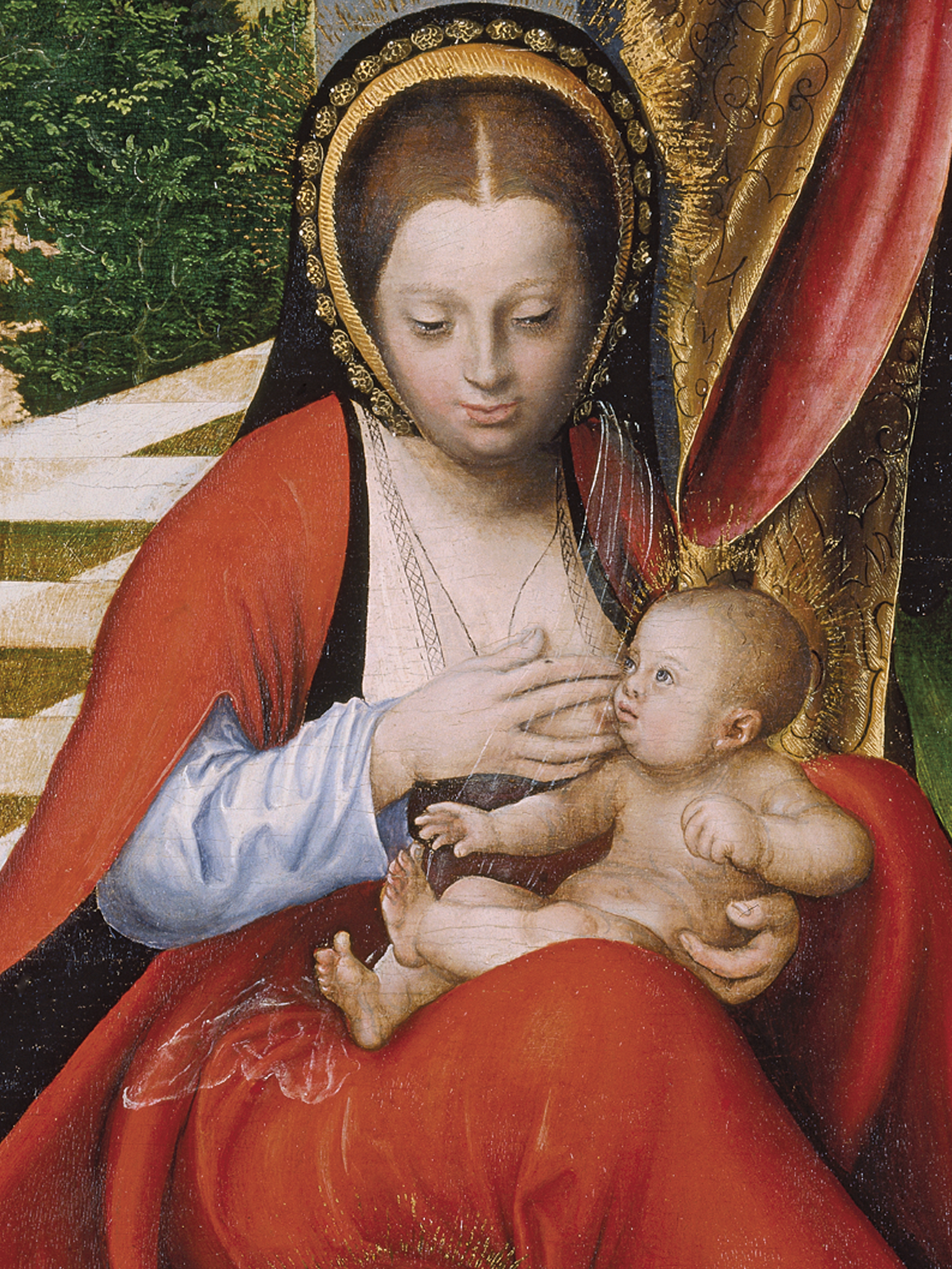
- Detail from Torgauer Altar by Lucas Cranach the Elder, 1509

Myrrhbearer
- Venerated in: Catholic Church, Eastern Orthodoxy, Lutheranism, Anglicanism
- Major shrine: Church of the Saintes Maries de la Mer, France
- Feast: 25 May (Roman Catholic), 8 April (Eastern Orthodox)
- Attributes: Holding a jar of ointment (Myrrhbearers)
- Patronage: Saintes-Maries-de-la-Mer
- Biographical Details
- Spouse: Alphaeus or Clopas
- Children: James, son of Alphaeus; Matthew the Apostle; Jude the Apostle

New Testament Identity
- Group: The Three Marys, Myrrhbearers
- Relatives: Sister or sister-in-law of The Virgin Mary

Mary, mother of James (Koine Greek: Μαρία ἡ τοῦ Ἰακώβου, romanized: María hē toû Iakṓbou, Aramaic: ܡܰܪܝܰܡ ܕ݁ܝܰܥܩܽܘܒ݂, romanized: Maryam dəYaʿqūḇ) is identified in the synoptic gospels as one of the women who went to Jesus' tomb after he was buried. Mark 16 (Mark 16:1) and Luke 24 (Luke 24:10) refer to "Mary the mother of James" as one of the Myrrhbearers, the women who went to the tomb of Jesus.

Along with Mary Magdalene and Mary of Clopas, Mary the mother of James is known as one of the Three Marys.

== Background ==
Matthew 27:56 says that "Mary the mother of James and Joseph" was watching the crucifixion from a distance. Mark 15:40 calls her "Mary the mother of James the younger and of Joses". James the younger is often identified with James, son of Alphaeus. The Catholic Encyclopedia identifies him with both James, son of Alphaeus and James the brother of Jesus (James the Just).

According to the surviving fragments of the work Exposition of the Sayings of the Lord of the Apostolic Father Papias of Hierapolis, who lived c. 70–163 AD, "Mary, mother of James the Less and Joseph, wife of Alphaeus was the sister of Mary the mother of the Lord, whom John names of Cleophas". For the Anglican theologian J.B. Lightfoot, this fragment quoted above would be spurious.

== Veneration ==
Mary, mother of James, is venerated as a saint in the Catholic Church, Eastern Orthodox Church, and Lutheranism. In Western tradition, she is often identified with Mary of Cleophas and is celebrated as one of The Three Marys who witnessed the Resurrection.

=== Feast days ===
In the Roman Rite of the Catholic Church, her feast day is 25 May, shared with Mary Salome. In the Eastern Orthodox Church, she is commemorated on 8 April and on the Sunday of the Myrrhbearers (the third Sunday of Pascha). The Evangelical Lutheran Church in America commemorates her as a faithful witness on 3 August.

=== Relics and shrines ===
Tradition holds that her relics were brought to the Camargue coast in France. The Church of the Saintes Maries de la Mer is a major pilgrimage site dedicated to her and Mary Salome. Additionally, the city of Veroli, Italy, claims to hold her relics and honors her as its patron saint.

== See also ==
- New Testament people named Mary
