= John 1:40 =

- ← 1:39 1:41 →
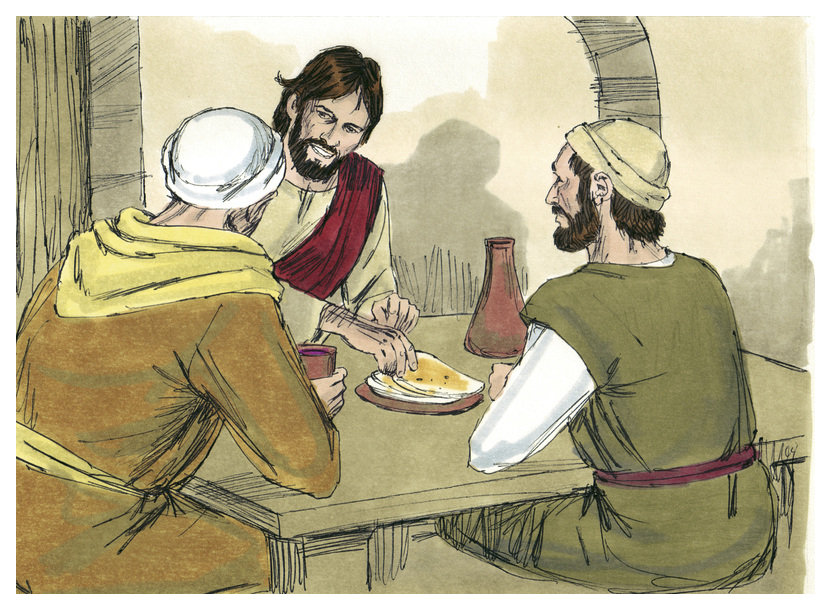
- "Jesus talked to two disciples" (Bible Illustrations by Jim Padgett, Sweet Media, 1984).
- Book: Gospel of John
- Christian Bible part: New Testament

John 1:40 is the 40th verse in the first chapter of the Gospel of John in the New Testament of the Christian Bible. It states that Andrew was a disciple of John the Baptist.

== Content ==
In the original Greek according to Westcott-Hort this verse is:

Ἦν Ἀνδρέας ὁ ἀδελφὸς Σίμωνος Πέτρου εἷς ἐκ τῶν δύο τῶν ἀκουσάντων παρὰ Ἰωάννου καὶ ἀκολουθησάντων αὐτῷ.

In the King James Version of the Bible the text reads:

One of the two which heard John speak, and followed him, was Andrew, Simon Peter’s brother.

The New International Version translates the passage as:

Andrew, Simon Peter's brother, was one of the two who heard what John had said and who had followed Jesus.

== Analysis ==
Cornelius a Lapide believes that this part was inserted to show how Peter, "the prince of the Apostles", was called. The verse shows Andrew's joy from conversing with Christ and his desire to bring his beloved brother to their divine calling. As Lapide says, "For as fire kindles fire, so does zeal kindle zeal." Archbishop McEvilly notes that "He is here, by anticipation, called 'Simon Peter', which name Christ promised him later in verse 42."

== Commentary from the Church Fathers ==
John Chrysostom, in his Homily XVIII: "One of the two which heard John speak and followed Him was Andrew, Simon Peter’s brother. Why is the other name left out? Some say, because this Evangelist himself was that other. Others, that it was a disciple of no eminence, and that there was no use in telling his name any more than those of the seventy-two, which are omitted."

English clergyman Henry Alford also thinks that the other disciple was most likely to have been the evangelist, because

(1) ... the Evangelist never names himself in his Gospel, and (2) that this account is so minutely accurate as to specify even the hours of the day, and in all respects bears marks of an eye-witness, and again (3) that this other disciple, from this last circumstance, certainly would have been named, had not the name been suppressed for some especial reason, [so] we are justified in inferring that it was the Evangelist himself.

Alcuin: "Or it would seem that the two disciples who followed Jesus were Andrew and Philip."

Preceded by John 1:39	Gospel of John; Chapter 1	Succeeded by John 1:41
