= John 1:36 =

- ← 1:35 1:37 →
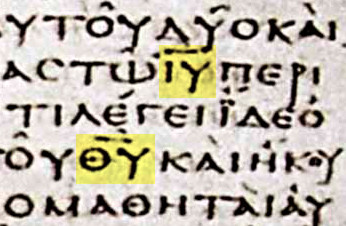
- Portion of John 1:36 in Codex Vaticanus (4th century), highlighting two nomina sacra: ΙΥ for Ἰησοῦ (upon "Jesus") and ΘΥ for Θεοῦ (of "God") in Greek.
- Book: Gospel of John
- Christian Bible part: New Testament

John 1:36 is the 36th verse in the first chapter of the Gospel of John in the New Testament of the Christian Bible.

== Content ==
In the original Greek according to Westcott-Hort this verse is:

καὶ ἐμβλέψας τῷ Ἰησοῦ περιπατοῦντι, λέγει, Ἴδε ὁ ἀμνὸς τοῦ Θεοῦ.

In the King James Version of the Bible the text reads:

And looking upon Jesus as he walked, he saith, Behold the Lamb of God!

The New International Version translates the passage as:

When he saw Jesus passing by, he said, "Look, the Lamb of God!"

The New American Standard Bible translates the passage as:

and he looked at Jesus as He walked, and said, “Behold, the Lamb of God!”

== Analysis ==
Cornelius a Lapide (1567-1637), an exegete of the Scriptures expands this verse, saying it was as if John said, “Behold Christ like a spotless Lamb, destined for a victim, that He may be offered to God upon the cross, for the sins of the whole world. Why do you follow me? follow Him who is the Lamb of God, the ransom of the world.” John MacEvilly (1818–1902), a Catholic Bible commentator, believes that Jesus was heading towards his home.

== Commentary from the Church Fathers ==
Theophylact of Ohrid: "Looking he saith, as if signifying by his looks his love and admiration for Christ."

Augustine: "John was the friend of the Bridegroom; he sought not his own glory, but bare witness to the truth. And therefore he wished not his disciples to remain with him, to the hindrance of their duty to follow the Lord; but rather showed them whom they should follow, saying, Behold the Lamb of God."

Chrysostom: "He makes not a long discourse, having only one object before him, to bring them and join them to Christ; knowing that they would not any further need his witness. John does not however speak to his disciples alone, but publicly in the presence of all. And so, undertaking to follow Christ, through this instruction common to all, they remained thenceforth firm, following Christ for their own advantage, not as an act of favour to their master. John does not exhort: he simply gazes in admiration on Christ, pointing out the gift He came to bestow, the cleansing from sin: and the mode in which this would be accomplished: both of which the word Lamb testifies to. Lamb has the article affixed to it, as a sign of pre-eminence."

Augustine: "For He alone and singly is the Lamb without spot, without sin; not because His spots are wiped off, but because He never had a spot. He alone is the Lamb of God, for by His blood alone can men be redeemed. This is the Lamb whom the wolves fear; even the slain Lamb, by whom the lion was slain."

Bede: "The Lamb therefore he calls Him; for that He was about to give us freely His fleece, that we might make of it a wedding garment; i. e. would leave us an example of life, by which we should be warmed into love."

Alcuin: "John stands in a mystical sense, the Law having ceased, and Jesus comes, bringing the grace of the Gospel, to which that same Law bears testimony. Jesus walks, to collect disciples."

Bede: "The walking of Jesus has a reference to the economy of the Incarnation, by means of which He has condescended to come to us, and give us a pattern of life."

| Preceded by John 1:35 | Gospel of John; Chapter 1 | Succeeded by John 1:37 |
