= John 1:38 =

- ← 1:37 1:39 →
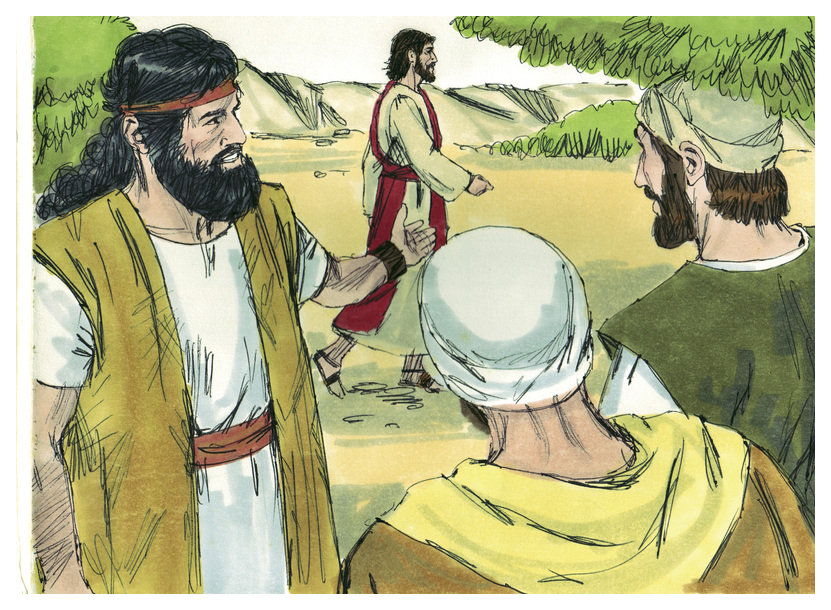
- "John the Baptist pointed Jesus to his two disciples" (Bible Illustrations by Jim Padgett, Sweet Media, 1984).
- Book: Gospel of John
- Christian Bible part: New Testament

John 1:38 is the 38th verse in the first chapter of the Gospel of John in the New Testament of the Christian Bible.

== Content ==
In the original Greek according to Westcott-Hort, this verse is:

Στραφεὶς δὲ ὁ Ἰησοῦς καὶ θεασάμενος αὐτοὺς ἀκολουθοῦντας, λέγει αὐτοῖς, Τί ζητεῖτε; Οἱ δὲ εἶπον αὐτῷ, Ῥαββί — ὃ λέγεται ἑρμηνευόμενον, Διδάσκαλε — ποῦ μένεις;

In the King James Version of the Bible the text reads:

Then Jesus turned, and saw them following, and saith unto them, What seek ye? They said unto him, Rabbi, (which is to say, being interpreted, Master,) where dwellest thou?

The New International Version translates the passage as:

Turning around, Jesus saw them following and asked, "What do you want?" They said, "Rabbi" (which means Teacher), "where are you staying?"

== Analysis ==
To the words "Jesus turning ..." St. Cyril notes that Jesus was not ignorant of what they sought, for He knew all things as God, but he asked in order that His question might start a conversation. Bede notes that by their expressive reply, "Rabbi" they honoured Christ, and sought His favour. Also there is an element in it of them wishing to become His disciples. They ask where he dwells, even though Christ is said to have no proper house, according to the gospel of St. Matthew: “Foxes have holes, and the birds of the air have nests, but the Son of Man has nowhere to lay His head.” Lapide comments that, the disciples ask this question, that they may be able to speak privately with Christ, and be instructed by Him in Divine things. "In this they show that they wish to become His friends and servants."

== Commentary from the Church Fathers ==
Theophylact of Ohrid: "Observe then, that it was upon those who followed Him, that our Lord turned His face and looked upon them. Unless thou by thy good works follow Him, thou shalt never be permitted to see His face, or enter into His dwelling."

Alcuin: "The disciples followed behind His back, in order to see Him, and did not see His face. So He turns round, and, as it were, lowers His majesty, that they might be enabled to behold His face."

Origen: "Perhaps it is not without a reason, that after six testimonies John ceases to bear witness, and Jesus asks seventhly, What seek ye?"

Chrysostom: "And besides following Him, their questions showed their love for Christ; They said unto Him, Rabbi, (which is, being interpreted, Master,) where dwellest Thou? They call Him, Master, before they have learnt any thing from Him; thus encouraging themselves in their resolution to become disciples, and to show the reason why they followed."

Origen: "An avowal, befitting persons who came from hearing John’s testimony. They put themselves under Christ’s teaching, and express their desire to see the dwelling of the Son of God."

Preceded by John 1:37	Gospel of John; Chapter 1	Succeeded by John 1:39
