= John 1:41 =

- ← 1:40 1:42 →
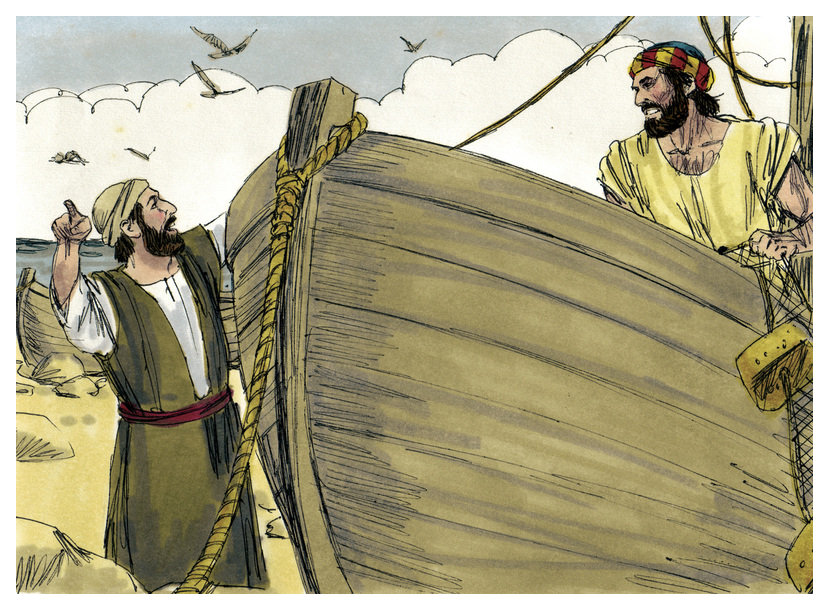
- "Andrew told Simon about the Messiah" (Bible Illustrations by Jim Padgett, Sweet Media, 1984).
- Book: Gospel of John
- Christian Bible part: New Testament

John 1:41 is the 41st verse in the first chapter of the Gospel of John in the New Testament of the Christian Bible.

== Content ==
In the original Greek according to Westcott-Hort this verse is:

Εὑρίσκει οὗτος πρῶτος τὸν ἀδελφὸν τὸν ἴδιον Σίμωνα, καὶ λέγει αὐτῷ, Εὑρήκαμεν τὸν Μεσσίαν — ὅ ἐστι μεθερμηνευόμενον, ὁ Χριστός.

In the King James Version of the Bible the text reads:

He first findeth his own brother Simon, and saith unto him, We have found the Messias, which is, being interpreted, the Christ.

The New International Version translates the passage as:

The first thing Andrew did was to find his brother Simon and tell him, "We have found the Messiah" (that is, the Christ).

== Commentary from the Church Fathers ==
Euthymius the Great comments on this portion saying that these words of Andrew are "the speech of one who is very glad; We have found Him whom we sought, whom we hoped should come, whom the Scriptures announced", while Bede notes, "No one finds but he who seeks: he who says that he has found shows that he had been a long while seeking." For the Messiah was long-awaited by the Jewish people.

Chrysostom: "Andrew kept not our Lord’s words to himself; but ran in haste to his brother, to report the good tidings: He first findeth his own brother Simon, and saith unto him, We have found the Messias, which is, being interpreted, the Christ."

Bede: "This is truly to find the Lord; viz. to have fervent love for Him, together with a care for our brother’s salvation."

Chrysostom: "The Evangelist does not mention what Christ said to those who followed Him; but we may infer it from what follows. Andrew declares in few words what he had learnt, discloses the power of that Master Who had persuaded them, and his own previous longings after Him. For this exclamation, We have found, expresses a longing for His coming, turned to exultation, now that He was really come."

Augustine: "Messias in Hebrew, Christus in Greek, Unctus in Latin. Chrism is unction, and He had a special unction, which from Him extended to all Christians, as appears in the Psalm, God, even Thy God, hath anointed Thee with the oil of gladness above Thy fellows. All holy persons arc partakers with Him; but He is specially the Holy of Holies, specially anointed."

Preceded by John 1:40	Gospel of John; Chapter 1	Succeeded by John 1:42
