= John 1:39 =

- ← 1:38 1:40 →
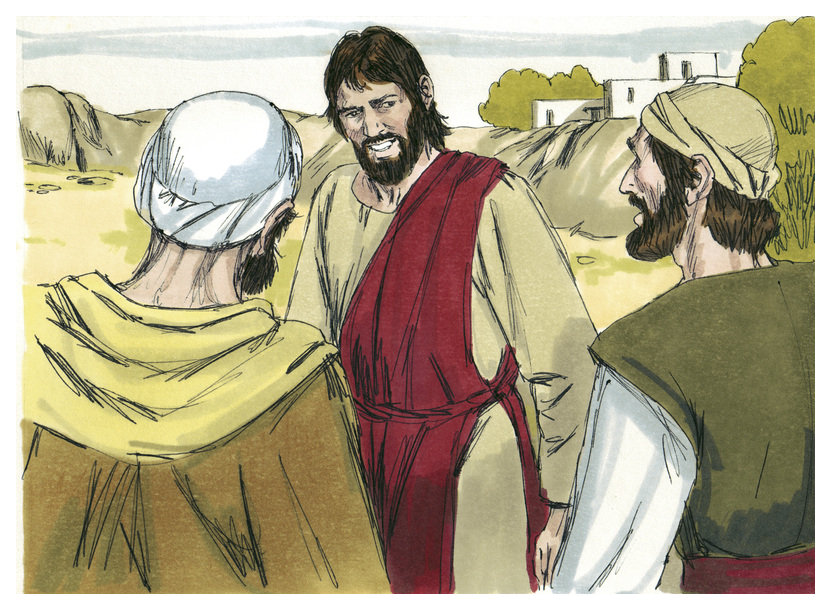
- "Jesus met two disciples" (Bible Illustrations by Jim Padgett, Sweet Media, 1984).
- Book: Gospel of John
- Christian Bible part: New Testament

John 1:39 is the 39th verse in the first chapter of the Gospel of John in the New Testament of the Christian Bible.

== Content ==
In the original Greek according to Westcott-Hort this verse is:

Λέγει αὐτοῖς, Ἔρχεσθε καὶ ἴδετε. Ἦλθον καὶ εἶδον ποῦ μένει· καὶ παρ᾿ αὐτῷ ἔμειναν τὴν ἡμέραν ἐκείνην· ὥρα δὲ ἦν ὡς δεκάτη.

In the King James Version of the Bible the text reads:

He saith unto them, Come and see. They came and saw where he dwelt, and abode with him that day: for it was about the tenth hour.

The New International Version translates the passage as:

"Come," he replied, "and you will see." So they went and saw where he was staying, and spent that day with him. It was about the tenth hour.

== Analysis ==
Note that the tenth hour is about 4pm, or about two hours before sunset. Lapide says that St. John adds these words, to show both the zeal of Christ, who, even though it was towards evening would not put them off until the following day, but started immediately upon the things pertaining to salvation. It also demonstrates the ardent devotion of the disciples of Christ, who are careless about their night's lodging, and would rather spend the night listening to Christ instead of being at home in their beds. Euthymius the Great states, "they remained with Him not merely the two hours which were left of daylight, as some suppose, but the whole night. For those two hours were not sufficient to speak about their affairs, and to know Christ." It appears that the night's instruction had a great effect on Andrew for Lapide notes, "he was so inflamed with love for Christ that he forthwith strove to gain his brother Peter to Christ, and inflame him with love for Him."

== Commentary from the Church Fathers ==
Alcuin: " They do not wish to be under His teaching for a time only, but enquire where He abides; wishing an immediate initiation in the secrets of His word, and afterwards meaning often to visit Him, and obtain fuller instruction. And, in a mystical sense too, they wish to know in whom Christ dwells, that profiting by their example they may themselves become fit to be His dwelling. Or, their seeing Jesus walking, and straightway enquiring where He resides, is an intimation to us, that we should, remembering His Incarnation, earnestly entreat Him to show us our eternal habitation. The request being so good a one, Christ promises a free and full disclosure. He saith unto them, Come and see: that is to say, My dwelling is not to be understood by words, but by works; come, therefore, by believing and working, and then see by understanding."

Origen: "Or perhaps come, is an invitation to action; see, to contemplation."

Chrysostom: "Christ does not describe His house and situation, but brings them after Him, showing that he had already accepted them as His own. He says not, It is not the time now, to-morrow ye shall hear if ye wish to learn; but addresses them familiarly, as friends who had lived with him a long time. But how is it that He saith in another place, The Son of man hath not where to lay His head? (Matt. 8:20) when here He says, Come and see where I live? His not having where to lay His head, could only have meant that He had no dwelling of His own, not that He did not live in a house at all: for the next words arc, They came and saw where He dwelt, and abode with Him that day. Why they stayed the Evangelist does not say: it being obviously for the sake of His teaching."

Augustine: "What a blessed day and night was that! Let us too build up in our hearts within, and make Him an house, whither He may come and teach us."

Theophylact of Ohrid: " And it was about the tenth hour. The Evangelist mentions the time of day purposely, as a hint both to teachers and learners, not to let time interfere with their work."

Chrysostom: "It showed a strong desire to hear Him, since even at sunset they did not turn from Him. To sensual persons the time after meals is unsuitable for any grave employment, their bodies being overloaded with food. But John, whose disciples these were, was not such an one. His evening was a more abstemious one than our mornings."

Augustine: "The number here signifies the law, which was composed of ten commandments. The time had come when the law was to be fulfilled by love, the Jews, who acted from fear, having been unable to fulfil it, and therefore was it at the tenth hour that our Lord heard Himself called, Rabbi; none but the giver of the law is the teacher of the law."

| Preceded by John 1:38 | Gospel of John; Chapter 1 | Succeeded by John 1:40 |
