= Abercius and Helena =

Christian saints and martyrs

Abercius and Helena are saints of the Catholic church. They are said to have been the children of Alphaeus the Apostle, although this has been challenged by some parties. Both of them are known to have been martyrs: Abercius by being exposed naked to bees, and Helena by stoning. They are commemorated with a feast day on May 20.

They are commemorated in the Orthodox Church on May 26.

== Sources ==
- Holweck, F. G. A Biographical Dictionary of the Saints. St. Louis, MO: B. Herder Book Co., 1924.
