= James the Less =

Christian saint and one of the Twelve Apostles

Saint James the Less
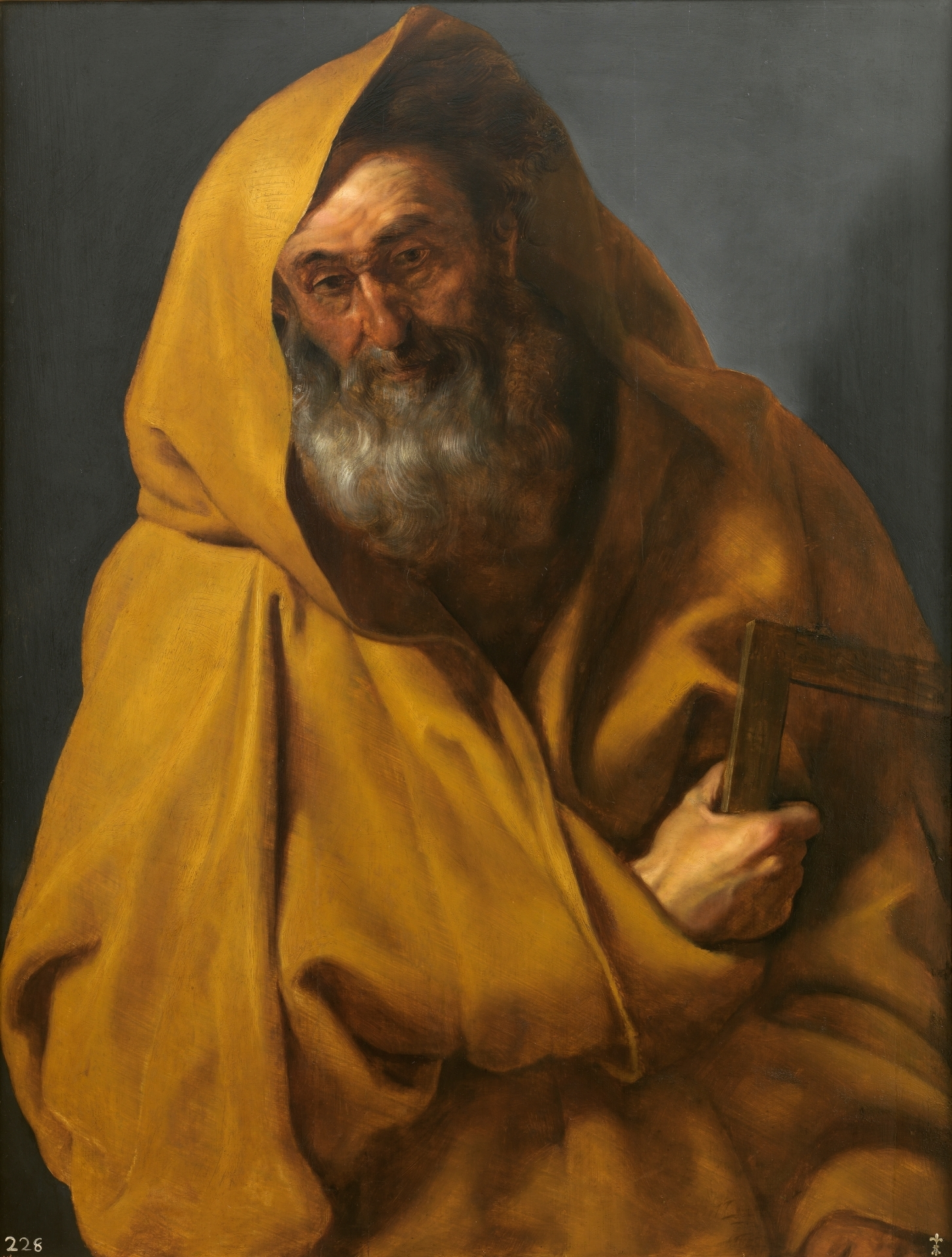
- St. James the Less by Peter Paul Rubens (1613)
- Venerated in: All Christian denominations which recognize saints

James the Less (Ancient Greek: Ἰάκωβος ὁ μικρός Iakōbos ho mikros) is a figure of early Christianity. He is also called "the Minor", "the Little", "the Lesser", or "the Younger", according to translation; James is styled "the Less" to distinguish him from the Apostle James the Great (also called "James the Elder"), with "Less" meaning younger or shorter rather than less important.

James the Less has traditionally been commemorated along with St. Philip in the Western Christian calendars. In the Roman Catholic Church their feast day was observed on 1 May until 1955, when it was moved to 11 May to accommodate the Feast of St Joseph the Worker on 1 May. A later revision of the calendar moved the feast to 3 May. In many other churches (for example, the Church of England) the feast has never moved from 1 May.

He is identified by Jerome as the same person also called "James the Just" and "James, brother of Jesus" in the Bible, thought of by Jerome and others as really a cousin of Jesus, and by Papias of Hierapolis he is also identified with "James, son of Alphaeus", one of the Twelve Apostles.

== New Testament ==
In the New Testament, the name "James" identifies multiple men. James the Less is named only in connection with his mother "Mary", who is also the mother of Joseph, who is called Joses by Mark (Joseph and Joses are variants of the same name). There are four mentions:

- "Mary, the mother of James and Joseph" (Matthew 27:56);
- "Mary, the mother of James the younger and of Joses" (Mark 15:40) ("James the younger" here has also been translated "James the less");
- "Mary, the mother of James" (Mark 16:1 and Luke 24:10).

This "Mary" may have been Mary of Clopas, mentioned only in John 19:25. It is unlikely to be Mary the mother of Jesus since she is not identified as Jesus' mother but only called the mother of James the Less and Joseph/Joses. In Matthew 27:56, she is clearly distinguished from the mother of James, son of Zebedee.

== Identification as James the brother of Jesus ==
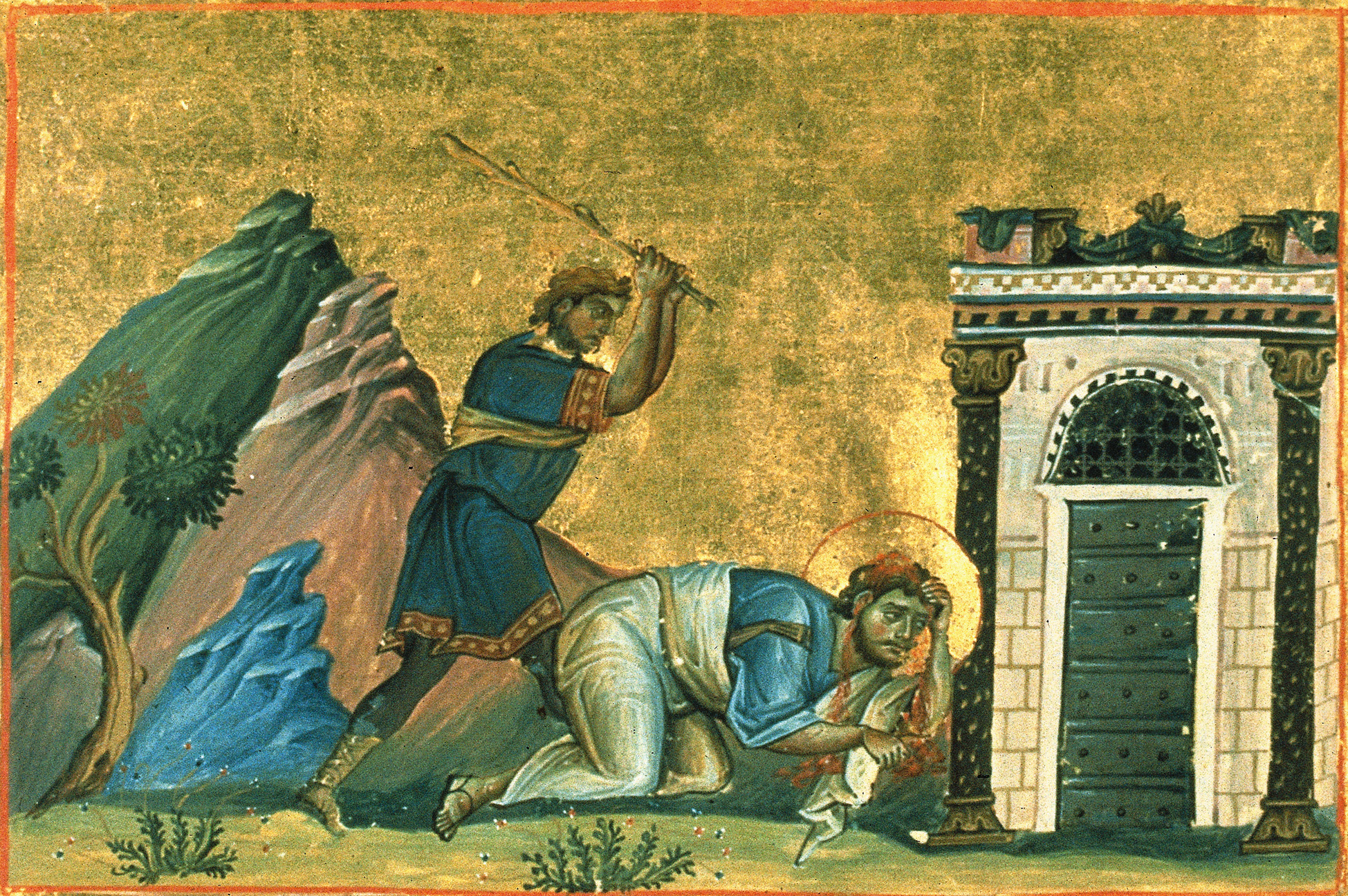
Saint James the Less, as depicted in the Menologion of Basil II (c. 1000 AD)

According to Jerome, James the Less is identified with James the brother of Jesus and with James, the son of Alphaeus.

Jerome first tells that James the Less must be identified with James, the son of Alphaeus.

No one doubts that there were two apostles called by the name James, James the son of Zebedee, and James the son of Alphaeus. The only conclusion is that the Mary who is described as the mother of James the Less was the wife of Alphaeus and sister of Mary the Lord's mother, the one who is called by John the Evangelist Mary of Clopas, whether after her father, or kindred, or for some other reason.

After that, James the Less being the same as James, the son of Alphaeus, Jerome describes in his work called De Viris Illustribus that James "the brother of the Lord" is the same as James, son of Alphaeus:

James, who is called the brother of the Lord, surnamed the Just, the son of Joseph by another wife, as some think, but, as appears to me, the son of Mary, sister of the mother of our Lord "Mary of Cleophas" of whom John makes mention in his book. [John 19:25]

Thus, Jerome concludes that James the Less, James, son of Alphaeus and James the brother of Jesus are one and the same person.

According to the Golden Legend, which is a collection of hagiographies, compiled by Jacobus de Voragine in the thirteenth century:

James the Apostle is said the Less, how well that he was elder of age than was St. James the More. He was called also the brother of our Lord, because he resembled much well our Lord in body, in visage, and of manner. He was called James the Just for his right great holiness. He was also called James the son of Alphaeus. He sang in Jerusalem the first mass that ever was sung therein, and he was first bishop of Jerusalem.

The same work adds "Simon Cananean and Judas Thaddeus were brethren of James the Less and sons of Mary Cleophas, which was married to Alpheus."

== Identification as James, the son of Alphaeus ==
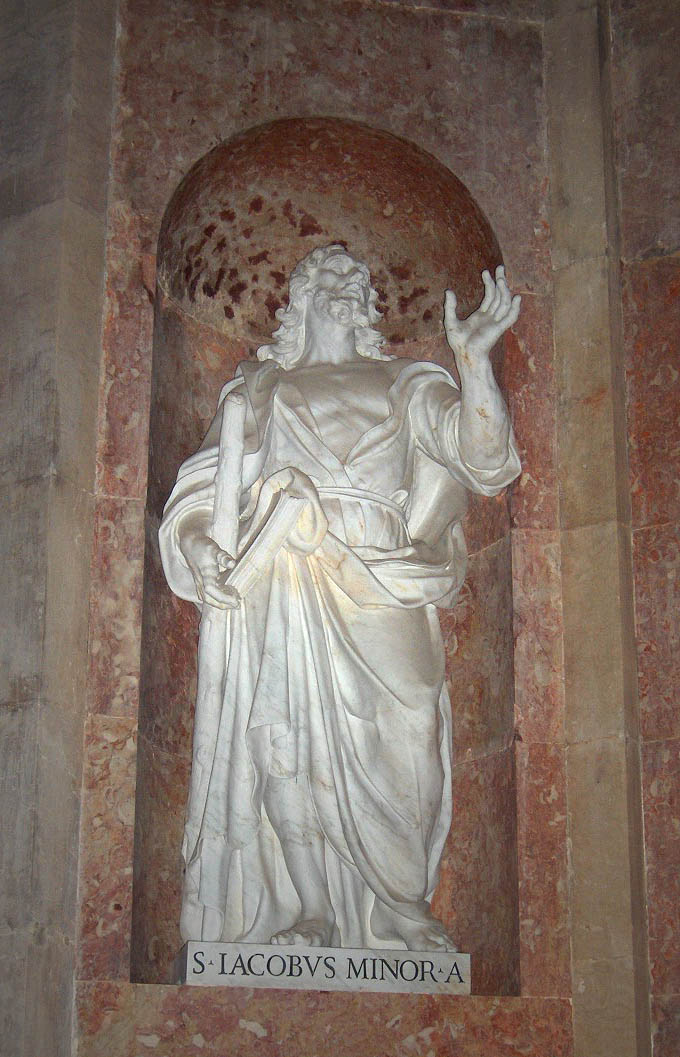
Statue of Saint James the Minor, Apostle, at the church of the Palace of Mafra, Portugal

The title, "the Less", is used to differentiate James from other people named James. Since it means that he is either the younger or shorter of two, he seems to be compared to one other James. In the lists of the twelve apostles in the synoptic Gospels, there are two apostles called James, who are differentiated there by their fathers: James, son of Zebedee, and James, son of Alphaeus. Long-standing tradition identifies James, the son of Alphaeus, as James the Less. James, son of Zebedee, is then called "James the Great" (although that designation does not appear in the New Testament). Some propose that Alphaeus was the same man as Cleophas or at least the husband of Mary of Clopas.

In this regard, Jerome identified James the Less with James, son of Alphaeus writing in his work called The Perpetual Virginity of Blessed Mary the following:

Do you intend the comparatively unknown James the Less, who is called in Scripture the son of Mary, not however of Mary the mother of our Lord, to be an apostle, or not? If he is an apostle, he must be the son of Alphaeus and a believer in Jesus, ‘For neither did his brethren believe in him.’ The only conclusion is that the Mary who is described as the mother of James the Less was the wife of Alphæus and sister of Mary the Lord's mother, the one who is called by John the Evangelist 'Mary of Clopas'.

Papias of Hierapolis, who lived circa 70–163 AD, relates in the surviving fragments of his work Exposition of the Sayings of the Lord that Mary, wife of Alphaeus is mother of James the Less:

Mary, mother of James the Less and Joseph, wife of Alphaeus was the sister of Mary the mother of the Lord, whom John names of Cleophas.

Therefore, James, son of Alphaeus would be the same as James the Less.

In Catholic tradition, James's mother is none other than Mary of Clopas who was among the women at the foot of the Cross of Jesus, weeping. For that reason, and given the fact that the Semitic word for brother is also used for other close relatives, James son of Alpheus is often held as a cousin to Jesus. He is also thought by some to be the brother of Matthew the Apostle, since the father of both was named Alphaeus (compare Mark 2:14 and 3:18).

Modern Biblical scholars are divided on whether this identification is correct. Catholic priest and biblical scholar John Paul Meier finds it unlikely. Amongst evangelicals, the New Bible Dictionary supports the traditional identification, while Don Carson and Darrell L. Bock both regard the identification as possible, but not certain.

== Relationships between Christians and the Roman Empire ==
According to the Italian historian Marta Sordi, evidence of the good relations between the Roman Empire and the early Christian communities up to 62 AD, and of Roman protection against anti-Jewish sentiment, is provided by the fact that the governor Lucius Albinus, who succeeded Porcius Festus, was deposed by King Herod Agrippa II under pressure from Rome, immediately after the death of James the Less. This has been linked to what happened after the stoning of Saint Stephen, the first martyr.

== In Islam ==
It is indicated in Qur'anic exegesis that James the Less was the individual who was crucified in place of Jesus: one name and one James is absent from the list of names of those who were reported to have been dispersed. The tasfir Ibn kathir appears to allude to his identity as a "young man."
