= John 1:37 =

- ← 1:36 1:38 →
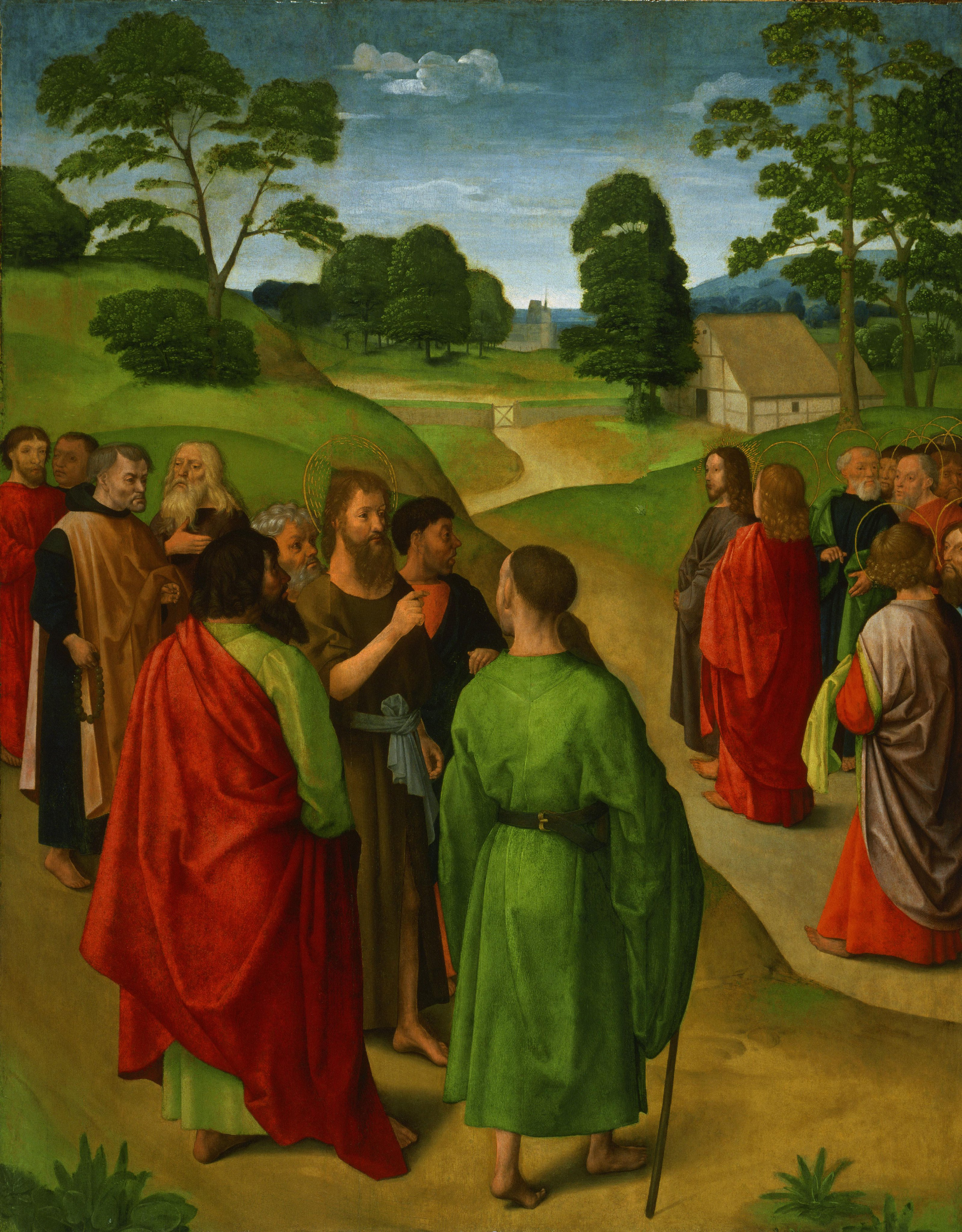
- John the Baptist pointing out Christ as the Lamb of God (painting from c. 1500-1510).
- Book: Gospel of John
- Christian Bible part: New Testament

John 1:37 is the 37th verse in the first chapter of the Gospel of John in the New Testament of the Christian Bible.

== Content ==
In the original Greek according to Westcott-Hort, this verse is:

Καὶ ἤκουσαν αὐτοῦ οἱ δύο μαθηταὶ λαλοῦντος, καὶ ἠκολούθησαν τῷ Ἰησοῦ.

In the King James Version of the Bible the text reads:

And the two disciples heard him speak, and they followed Jesus.

The New International Version translates the passage as:

When the two disciples heard him say this, they followed Jesus.

== Analysis ==
Only two of John's disciples follow Christ. One of those was Andrew, as we see in verse 40. The other is not known, although St. John Chrysostom says it was the author St. John. Euthymius notes that they followed Jesus so that they might know Him more fully and perhaps become his disciples rather than John's. MacEvilly notes their attentiveness to John's words, "heard him say", the day before.

== Commentary from the Church Fathers ==
Alcuin: "John having borne witness that Jesus was the Lamb of God, the disciples who had been hitherto with him, in obedience to his command, followed Jesus: And the two disciples heard him speak, and they followed Jesus."

Chrysostom: "Observe; when he said, He that cometh after me is made before me, and, Whose shoe's latchet I am not worthy to unloose, he gained over none; but when he made mention of the economy, and gave his discourse a humbler turn, saying, Behold the Lamb of God, then his disciples followed Christ. For many persons are less influenced by the thoughts of God's greatness and majesty, than when they hear of His being man's Helper and Friend; or any thing pertaining to the salvation of men. Observe too, when John says, Behold the Lamb of God, Christ says nothing. The Bridegroom stands by in silence; others introduce Him, and deliver the Bride into His hands; He receives her, and so treats her that she no longer remembers those who gave her in marriage. Thus Christ came to unite to Himself the Church; He said nothing Himself; but John, the friend of the Bridegroom, came forth, and put the Bride's right hand in His; i. e. by his preaching delivered into His hands men's souls, whom receiving He so disposed of, that they returned no more to John. And observe farther; As at a marriage the maiden goes not to meet the bridegroom, (even though it be a king's son who weds a humble handmaid,) but he hastens to her; so is it here. For human nature ascended not into heaven, but the Son of God came down to human nature, and took her to His Father's house. Again; There were disciples of John who not only did not follow Christ, but were even enviously disposed toward Him; but the better part heard, and followed; not from contempt of their former master, but by his persuasion; because he promised them that Christ would baptize with the Holy Ghost. And see with what modesty their zeal was accompanied. They did not straight way go and interrogate Jesus on great and necessary doctrines, nor in public, but sought private converse with Him; for we are told that Jesus turned, and saw them following, and saith unto them, What seek ye? Hence we learn, that when we once begin to form good resolutions, God gives us opportunities enough of improvement. Christ asks the question, not because He needed to be told, but in order to encourage familiarity and confidence, and show that He thought them worthy of His instructions."

Preceded by John 1:36	Gospel of John; Chapter 1	Succeeded by John 1:38
