= John 1:42 =

- ← 1:41 1:43 →
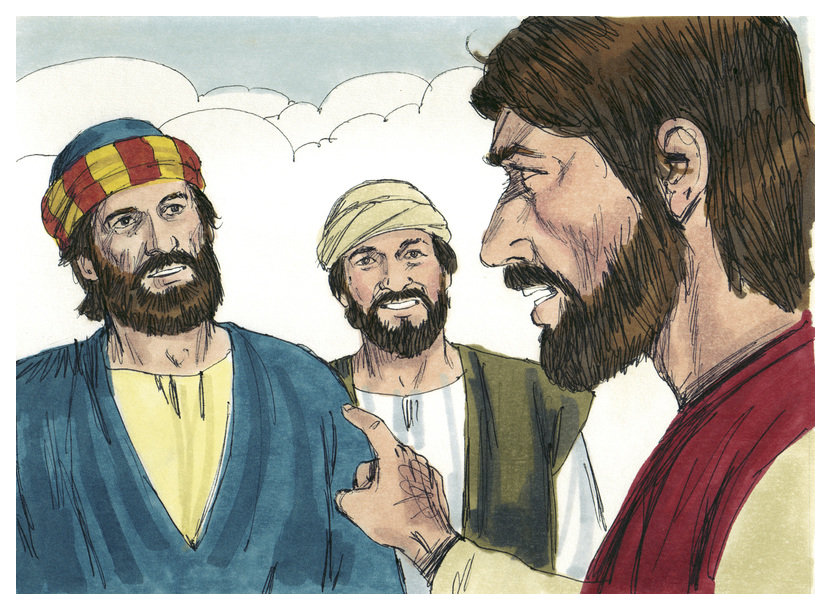
- "Jesus talked to Simon, the brother of Andrew" (1984 illustration).
- Book: Gospel of John
- Christian Bible part: New Testament

John 1:42 is the 42nd verse in the first chapter of the Gospel of John in the New Testament of the Christian Bible.

== Content ==
In the original Greek according to the Majority text and the Textus Receptus this verse is:

Καὶ ἤγαγεν αὐτὸν πρὸς τὸν Ἰησοῦν. Ἐμβλέψας δὲ αὐτῷ ὁ Ἰησοῦς εἶπε, Σὺ εἶ Σίμων ὁ υἱὸς Ἰωνᾶ· σὺ κληθήσῃ Κηφᾶς — ὃ ἑρμηνεύεται Πέτρος.

and according to Westcott-Hort the original Greek is:

ἤγαγεν αὐτὸν πρὸς τὸν Ἰησοῦν. ἐμβλέψας αὐτῷ ὁ Ἰησοῦς εἶπεν Σὺ εἶ Σίμων ὁ υἱὸς Ἰωάνου, σὺ κληθήσῃ Κηφᾶς ὃ ἑρμηνεύεται Πέτρος.

The main difference here is that the Westcott-Hort text calls Simon the son of John instead of the son of Jona. In the Gospel of Matthew 16:17 both texts agree and say that Simon is the son of Jona (Βαριωνᾶ), while in John 21:21 there is disagreement again, with Westcott-Hort having Simon John (Σίμων Ἰωάνου) and both the majority and the received text have Simon Jona (Σίμων Ἰωνᾶ).

In the King James Version of the Bible the text reads:

And he brought him to Jesus. And when Jesus beheld him, he said, Thou art Simon the son of Jona: thou shalt be called Cephas, which is by interpretation, A stone.

The New International Version translates the passage as:

And he brought him to Jesus. Jesus looked at him and said, "You are Simon son of John. You will be called Cephas" (which, when translated, is Peter).

== Analysis ==
Irish Archbishop John McEvilly comments on the phrase "And Jesus looking at him" as "penetrating into him by that divine vision, which has before it future as well as the present", seeing that Peter was to be a steadfast rock of the Church. Or as Cornelius a Lapide puts it, it is as if Christ had said, "for I will make you the rock of the Church, so that on you and your faith, and your government, the fabric of My Church may rest securely as upon a most solid foundation of rock". There are echoes of Abraham receiving his name in Genesis 17:5 as well. Lutheran Pietist Johann Bengel notes that Ἐμβλέψας is best read as "having gazed earnestly at him" or "[fixed] His eye upon him".

Some Roman Catholics use this verse and Matthew 16:18 in support of the Primacy of Peter.

== Commentary from the Church Fathers ==
Chrysostom: "And therefore he said not Messias, but the Messias. Mark the obedience of Peter from the very first; he went immediately without delay, as appears from the next words: And he brought him to Jesus. Nor let us blame him as too yielding, because he did not ask many questions, before he received the word. It is reasonable to suppose that his brother had told him all, and sufficiently fully; but the Evangelists often make omissions for the sake of brevity. But, besides this, it is not absolutely said that he did believe, but only, He took him to Jesus; i. e. to learn from the mouth of Jesus Himself, what Andrew had reported. Our Lord begins now Himself to reveal the things of His Divinity, and to exhibit them gradually by prophecy. For prophecies are no less persuasive than miracles; inasmuch as they are preeminently God’s work, and are beyond the power of devils to imitate, while miracles may be phantasy or appearance: the foretelling future events with certainty is an attribute of the incorruptible nature alone: And when Jesus beheld him, He said, Thou art Simon the son of Jonas; thou shall be called Cephas, which is by interpretation, A stone."

Bede: "He beheld him not with His natural eye only, but by the insight of His Godhead discerned from eternity the simplicity and greatness of his soul, for which he was to be elevated above the whole Church. In the word Peter, we must not look for any additional meaning, as though it were of Hebrew or Syriac derivation; for the Greek and Latin word Peter, has the same meaning as Cephas; being in both languages derived from petra. He is called Peter on account of the firmness of his faith, in cleaving to that Rock, of which the Apostle speaks, And that Rock was Christ; (1 Cor. 10:4) which secures those who trust in it from the snares of the enemy, and dispenses streams of spiritual gifts."

Augustine: "There was nothing very great in our Lord saying whose son he was, for our Lord knew the names of all His saints, having predestinated them before the foundation of the world. But it was a great thing for our Lord to change his name from Simon to Peter. Peter is from petra, rock, which rock is the Church: so that the name of Peter represents the Church. And who is safe, unless he build upon a rock? Our Lord here rouses our attention: for had he been called Peter before, we should not have seen the mystery of the Rock, and should have thought that he was called so by chance, and not providentially. God therefore made him to be called by another name before, that the change of that name might give vividness to the mystery."

Chrysostom: "He changed the name too to show that He was the same who done so before in the Old Testament; who had called Abram Abraham, Sarai Sarah, Jacob Israel. Many He had named from their birth, as Isaac and Samson; others again after being named by their parents, as were Peter, and the sons of Zebedee. Those whose virtue was to be eminent from the first, have names given them from the first; those who were to be exalted afterwards, are named afterwards."

Augustine: "The account here of the two disciples on the Jordan, who follow Christ (before he had gone into Galilee) in obedience to John’s testimony; viz. of Andrew bringing his brother Simon to Jesus, who gave him, on this occasion, the name of Peter; disagrees considerably with the account of the other Evangelists, viz. that our Lord found these two, Simon and Andrew, fishing in Galilee, and then bid them follow Him: unless we understand that they did not regularly join our Lord when they saw Him on the Jordan; but only discovered who He was, and full of wonder, then returned to their occupations. Nor must we think that Peter first received his name on the occasion mentioned in Matthew, when our Lord says, Thou art Peter, and upon this rock will I build My Church; (Mat. 16:18) but rather when our Lord says, Thou shall be called Cephas, which is by interpretation, A stone."

Alcuin: "Or perhaps He does not actually give him the name now, but only fixes beforehand what He afterwards gave him when He said, Thou art Peter, and upon this rock will I build My Church. And while about to change his name, Christ wishes to show that even that which his parents had given him, was not without a meaning. For Simon signifies obedience, Joanna grace, Jona a dove: as if the meaning was; Thou art an obedient son of grace, or of the dove, i. e. the Holy Spirit; for thou hast received of the Holy Spirit the humility, to desire, at Andrew’s call, to see Me. The elder disdained not to follow the younger; for where there is meritorious faith, there is no order of seniority."

== See also ==
- Matthew 16 (verse 19)
- Primacy of Peter

Preceded by John 1:41	Gospel of John; Chapter 1	Succeeded by John 1:43
