= James, son of Alphaeus =

Apostle of Jesus

Saint James the Lesser
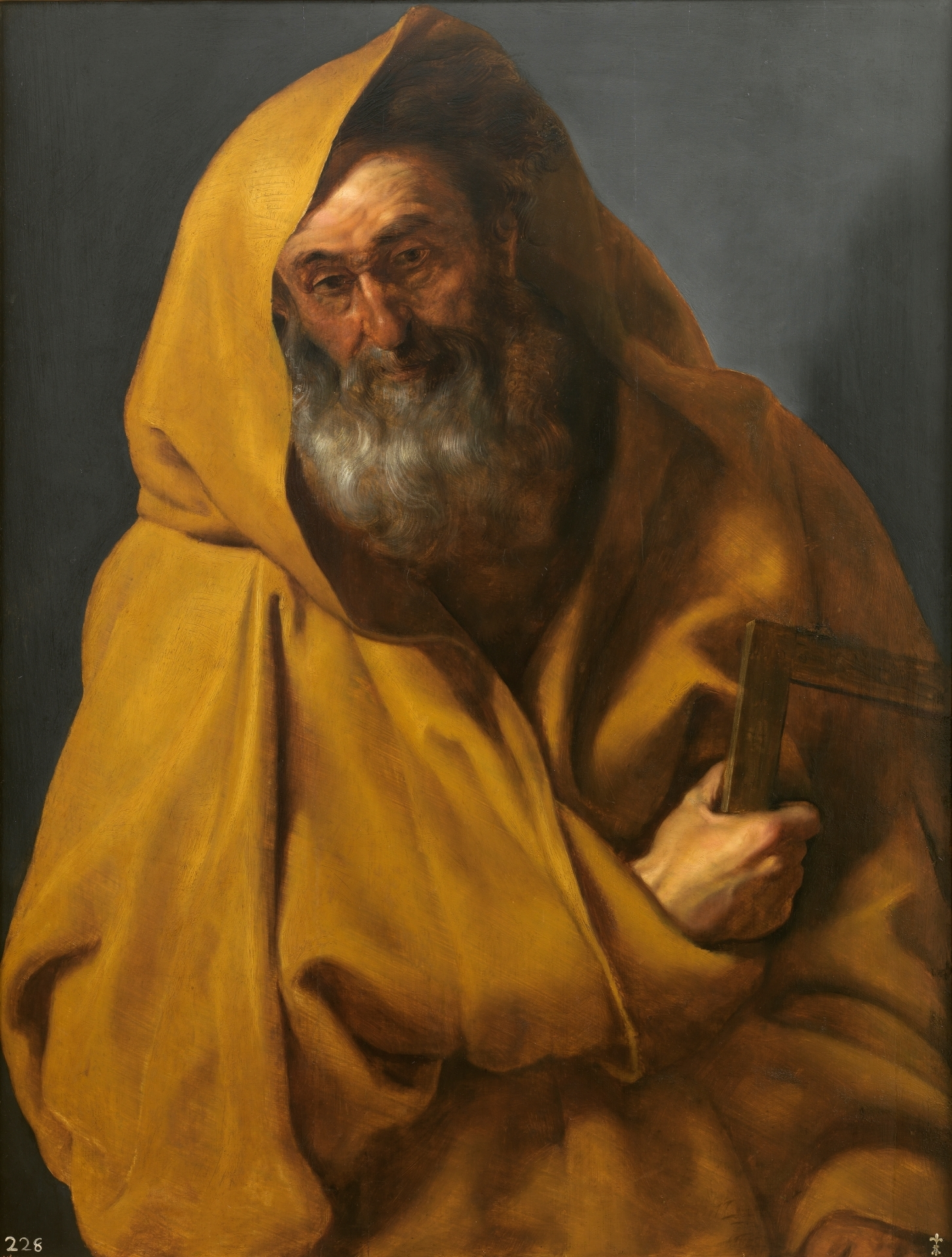
- St James the Minor by Peter Paul Rubens (1613)

Apostle and Martyr
- Born: c. 10 BC; Galilee, Judaea, Roman Empire
- Died: c. 62 AD; Jerusalem, Judaea, Roman Empire or Aegyptus, Roman Empire
- Venerated in: All Christian denominations that venerate saints
- Feast: 1 May (Anglican Communion), May 3 (Roman Catholic Church), 9 October (Eastern Orthodox Church)
- Attributes: Carpenter's saw; fuller's club
- Patronage: Apothecaries; druggists; dying people; Frascati, Italy; fullers; milliners; Monterotondo, Italy; pharmacists; Uruguay

James, son of Alphaeus (Greek: Ἰάκωβος, Iakōbos; Aramaic: ܝܥܩܘܒ ܒܪ ܚܠܦܝ; Hebrew: יעקב בן חלפי Ya'akov ben Halfai; Coptic: ⲓⲁⲕⲱⲃⲟⲥ ⲛⲧⲉ ⲁⲗⲫⲉⲟⲥ; Arabic: يعقوب بن حلفى, romanized: Ya'qūb bin Halfā) was one of the Twelve Apostles of Jesus, appearing under this name in all three of the Synoptic Gospels' lists of the apostles. He is generally identified with James the Less (Ancient Greek: Ἰάκωβος ὁ μικρός Iakōbos ho mikros, Mark 15:40) and commonly known by that name in church tradition. He is also labelled "the Minor", "the Little", "the Lesser", or "the Younger", according to translation. He is distinct from James, son of Zebedee and in some interpretations also from James, brother of Jesus (James the Just). He appears only four times in the New Testament, each time in a list of the twelve apostles.

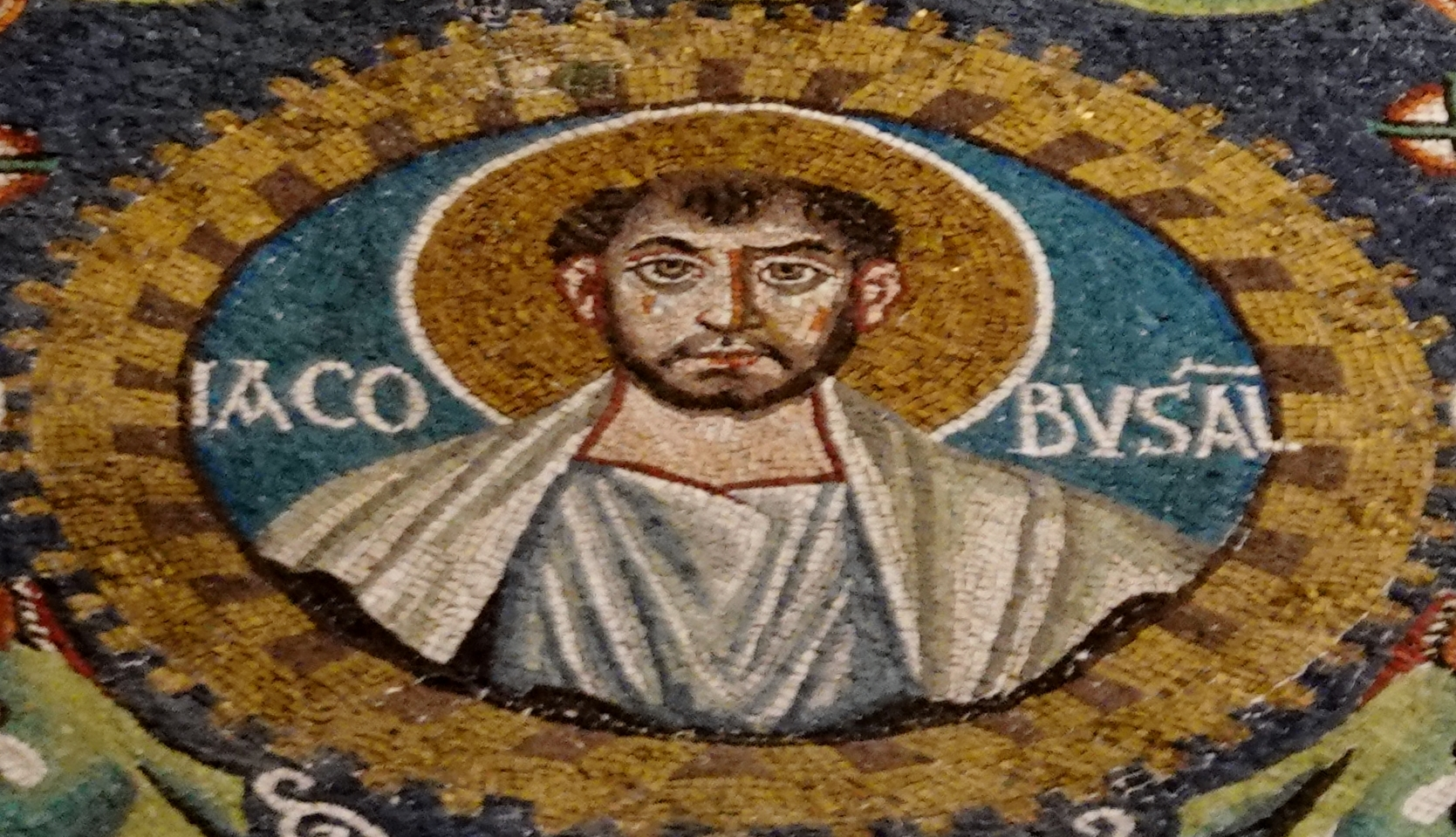
James, son of Alphaeus, detail of the mosaic in the Basilica of San Vitale, Ravenna, 6th century

== Identity ==
=== Possible identity as James the Less ===
James, son of Alphaeus, is often identified as James the Less, who is only mentioned four times in the Bible, each time in connection with his mother. Mark 15:40 refers to "Mary the mother of James the younger and of Joses", while Mark 16:1 and Matthew 27:56 refer to "Mary the mother of James".

Since there was already another James (James, son of Zebedee) among the twelve apostles, equating James, son of Alphaeus, with "James the Less" made sense. (James, son of Zebedee, was sometimes called "James the Greater").

Jerome identifies James, son of Alpheus, with James the Less, writing in his work called The Perpetual Virginity of Blessed Mary the following:

Do you intend the comparatively unknown James the Less, who is called in Scripture the son of Mary, not however of Mary the mother of our Lord, to be an apostle, or not? If he is an apostle, he must be the son of Alphæus and a believer in Jesus, "For neither did his brethren believe in him."

The only conclusion is that the Mary who is described as the mother of James the Less was the wife of Alphæus and sister of Mary the Lord's mother, the one who is called by John the Evangelist "Mary of Clopas".

It has sometimes been thought that Papias of Hierapolis, who lived circa 70–163 AD, in the surviving fragments of his work Exposition of the Sayings of the Lord relates that Mary, wife of Alphaeus, is the mother of James the Less:

Mary, mother of James the Less and Joseph, wife of Alphaeus was the sister of Mary the mother of the Lord, whom John names of Cleophas, either from her father or from the family of the clan, or for some other reason.

However, this is likely a misattribution. Rather, this quote should be attributed to the eleventh-century lexicographer Papias, not the second-century Papias of Hierapolis, and indeed this passage has been found directly in the lexicographer's writings.

Modern Biblical scholars are divided on whether the identification of James of Alphaeus with James the Less is correct. John Paul Meier finds it unlikely. Amongst evangelicals, the New Bible Dictionary supports the traditional identification, while Don Carson and Darrell Bock both regard the identification as possible, but not certain.

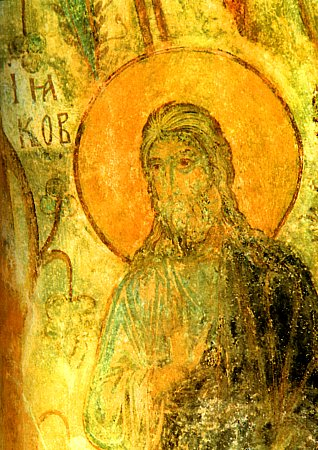
Fresco of Saint James the Less in the Orthodox Church of Vladimir, Russia. 12th century.

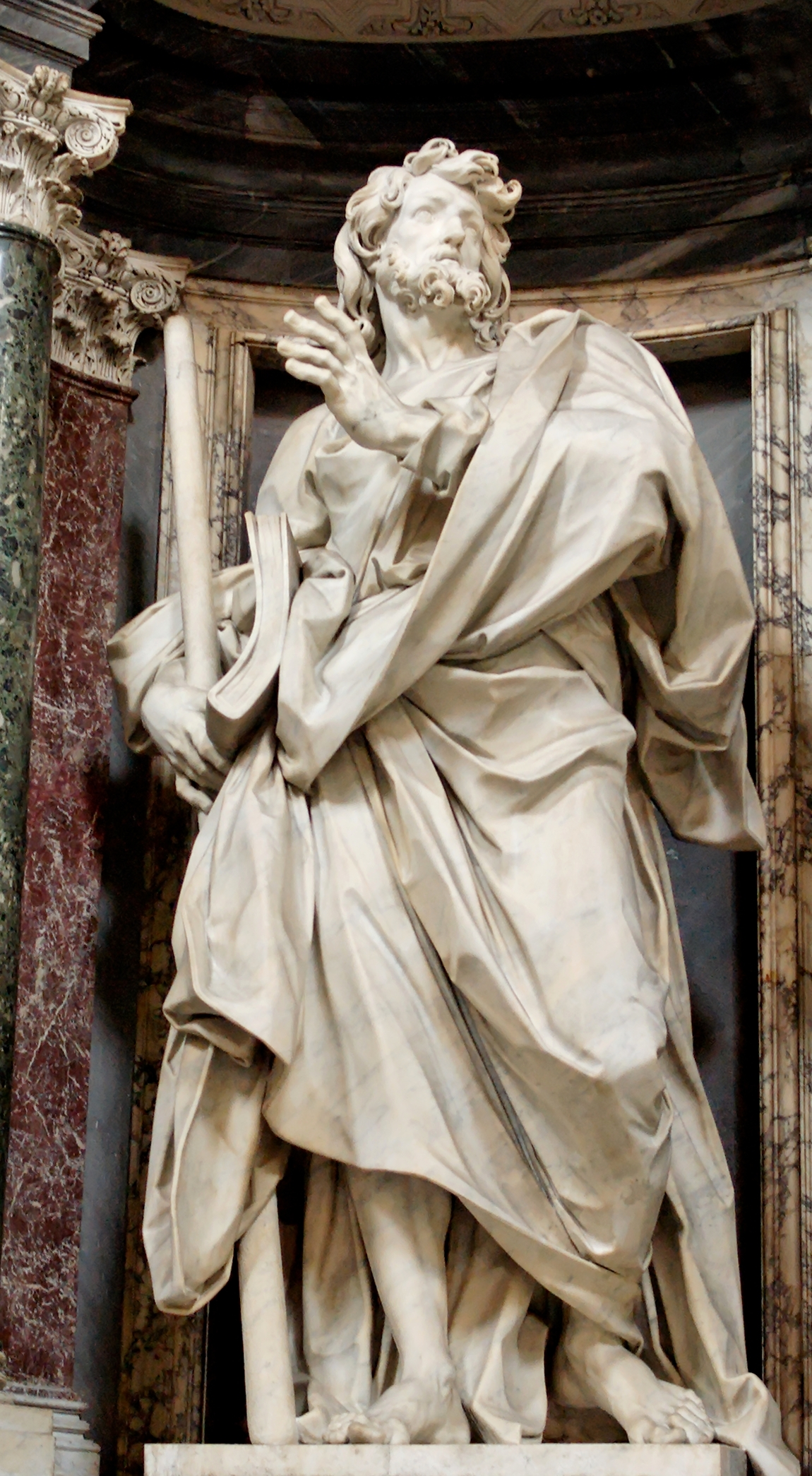
Statue of St. James in the Archbasilica of St. John Lateran by Angelo de Rossi.

=== Possible identification as James, the brother of Jesus ===
Jerome, voicing the general opinion of Early Church, maintains the doctrine of perpetual virginity of Mary. He proposed that James, son of Alphaeus, was the one referred to as "James, the brother of the Lord" (Galatians 1:19) but that the term "brother" was to be understood as "cousin." The view of Jerome, the "Hieronymian view," became widely accepted in the Roman Catholic Church, though certain Protestants do not subscribe to this view. Geike (1884) states that Hausrath, Delitzsch, and Schenkel think James, the brother of Jesus, was the son of Clophas-Alphaeus.

In two small but potentially important works ascribed by some to Hippolytus, On the Twelve Apostles of Christ and On the Seventy Apostles of Christ, he relates the following:

And James the son of Alphaeus, when preaching in Jerusalem was stoned to death by the Jews, and was buried there beside the temple.

James, the brother of Jesus is attributed the same death; he was stoned to death by the Jews, too. This testimony of "Hippolytus", if authentic, would increase the plausibility that James the son of Alphaeus is the same person as James the brother of Jesus.

These two works of "Hippolytus" are often neglected because the manuscripts were lost during most of the Christian era and then discovered in Greece in the 19th century. As most scholars consider them spurious, they are often ascribed to "Pseudo-Hippolytus". The two are included in an appendix to the works of Hippolytus in the voluminous collection of Early Church Fathers.

According to the surviving fragments of the work Exposition of the Sayings of the Lord by Papias of Hierapolis, Cleophas and Alphaeus are the same person, Mary, wife of Cleophas or Alphaeus, would be the mother of James, the brother of Jesus, and of Simon and Judas (Thaddeus), and of one Joseph.

(1) Mary the mother of the Lord; (2) Mary the wife of Cleophas or Alphaeus, who was the mother of James the bishop and apostle, and of Simon and Thaddeus, and of one Joseph; (3) Mary Salome, wife of Zebedee, mother of John the evangelist and James; (4) Mary Magdalene. These four are found in the Gospel...(Fragment X)

Thus, James, the brother of the Lord, would be the son of Alphaeus, who is the husband of Mary of Cleophas, or Mary, the wife of Alphaeus. However, the Anglican theologian J.B. Lightfoot maintains that the fragment in question is spurious.

As reported by the Golden Legend, which is a collection of hagiographies compiled by Jacobus de Voragine in the thirteenth century:

James the Apostle is said the Less, how well that was the elder of age than was St. James the More. He was called also the brother of our Lord, because I have resembled much well our Lord in body, in visage, and of manner. He was called James the Just for his right great holiness. He was also called James the son of Alpheus. He sang in Jerusalem the first mass that ever was there, and he was first bishop of Jerusalem.

=== Possible brother of Matthew ===
Alphaeus is also the name of the father of the tax-collector Levi mentioned in Mark 2:14. The publican appears as Matthew in Matthew 9:9, which has led some to conclude that James and Matthew might have been brothers. The four times that James son of Alphaeus is mentioned directly in the Bible (each time in the list of the Apostles), the only family relationship stated is that his father is Alphaeus. In two lists of the Apostles, the other James and John are listed as brothers, and their father is Zebedee.

== Gospel sources ==
=== Gospel of Mark ===
==== Calling of James, son of Alphaeus ====
Mark the Evangelist is the earliest known source in the Bible to mention "James, son of Alphaeus" as one of the twelve Apostles. Mark the Evangelist mentions a "James, son of Alphaeus" only once, and this is in his list of the 12 Apostles (Mark 3, (Mark 3:16–19)). At the beginning of Jesus' ministry, he first calls Peter and his brother Andrew and asks them to follow him (Mark 1:16–17). In the next verses, it tells the story of how James the Greater and his brother John the Apostle came to follow Jesus (Mark 1:19–20). After some healing by Jesus, he meets Levi, son of Alphaeus, who was a tax collector, and he then asks Levi (better known as Matthew) to follow him (Mark 2:14 and Matthew 9:9). Peter, Andrew, James the Greater, and John the Apostle are listed as Apostles (Mark 3:16–19). Levi, son of Alphaeus, is listed as an Apostle under the name of Matthew, and James alone is listed as the son of Alphaeus (Mark 3:16–19).

==== Ambiguous Jameses ====
Overall, Mark the Evangelist lists three different Jameses: "James, son of Alphaeus", James the Greater, and James the brother of Jesus (Mark 6:3). On three occasions, he writes about a James without clarifying which James he is referring to. There is a James at the transfiguration, (Mark 9, Mark 9:2), at the Mount of Olives, (Mark 13, Mark 13:3), and the Garden of Gethsemane, Mark 14, Mark 14:33). Although this James is listed alongside John the Apostle, a clear distinction is not made about which Apostle James is being referred to, even when both Apostles are meant to be in a similar location. All twelve Apostles attend the Last Supper (Mark 14:33), which immediately precedes the Garden of Gethsemane. There is a reference to Mary mother of James the Younger and Joseph (Mark 15, Mark 15:40); however, Mark the Evangelist has already said that James the brother of Jesus has a brother called Joseph (Mark 6, Mark 6:3).

=== Gospel of Matthew ===
==== Calling of James, son of Alphaeus ====
Peter, Andrew, James, son of Zebedee, and his brother John were all called to follow Jesus (Matthew 4, Matthew 4:18–22). In a story that parallels the calling of Levi, son of Alphaeus, Matthew is called to follow Jesus (Matthew 9, Matthew 9:9–13). Matthew is never referred directly to as being the Son of Alphaeus in the Gospel of Matthew or any other book in the Bible, but as Levi, Son of Alphaeus (Mark 2, Mark 2:14). In Mark, he is regarded as a tax collector (Matthew 9:9). In the Gospel of Matthew, the tax collector (Matthew) called to follow Jesus is listed as one of the twelve Apostles. James, son of Alphaeus, is also listed as one of the 12 Apostles (Matthew 10, Matthew 10:3).

==== Ambiguous Jameses ====
Matthew does not mention any James in his Gospel who is not identified without association with his family. There are three James that are mentioned by Matthew; James, Brother of Jesus, Joseph, Simon and Judas (Matthew 13, Matthew 13:55), James son of Zebedee and brother of John (Matthew 10, Matthew 10:2) and James, son of Alphaeus. At the Transfiguration it is specified that the James is brother of John (Matthew 17, Matthew 17:1) and at the Garden of Gethsemane it is specified that it is the son of Zebedee (Matthew 26, Matthew 26:37). It is not specified by Matthew that there was a James at the Mount of Olives; he mentions only disciples (Matthew 24, Matthew 24:3). Matthew also mentions a Mary, the mother of James and Joseph, who was at the crucifixion. This James is not given the epithet the younger (Matthew 27, Matthew 27:56).

== Death ==
Once James was arrested along with some other Christians and was executed by King Herod Agrippa in his persecution of the church (Acts 12, Acts 12:1,2). However, the James in Acts 12:1,2 has a brother called John. James, son of Zebedee, has a brother called John (Matthew 4, Matthew 4:21) and he had a brother named Joseph (Joses) Mark 15:40. Robert Eisenman and Achille Camerlynck both suggest that the death of James in Acts 12:1–2 is James, son of Zebedee, and not James son of Alphaeus.

In Christian art, James the Less is depicted holding a fuller's club. One tradition maintains that he was crucified at Ostrakine in Lower Egypt, where he was preaching the Gospel.

In Eastern Orthodox Church his feast is 9 October and 30 June (Synaxis of the Apostles).
