= John 1:43 =

- ← 1:42 1:44 →
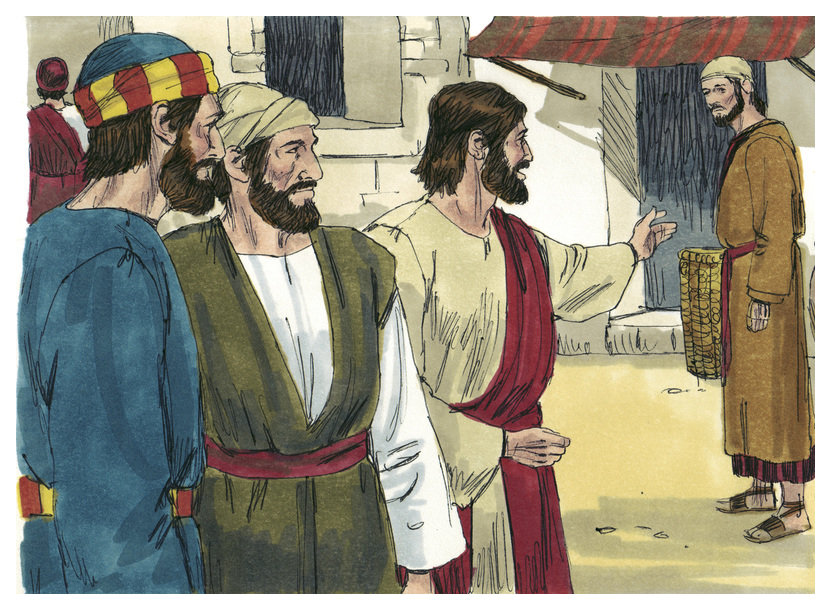
- "Jesus called Philip to follow Him" (Bible Illustrations by Jim Padgett, Sweet Media, 1984).
- Book: Gospel of John
- Christian Bible part: New Testament

John 1:43 is the 43rd verse in the first chapter of the Gospel of John in the New Testament of the Christian Bible.

== Content ==
In the original Greek according to Westcott-Hort this verse is:

Τῇ ἐπαύριον ἠθέλησεν ὁ Ἰησοῦς ἐξελθεῖν εἰς τὴν Γαλιλαίαν, καὶ εὑρίσκει Φίλιππον, καὶ λέγει αὐτῷ, Ἀκολούθει μοι.

In the King James Version of the Bible the text reads:

The day following Jesus would go forth into Galilee, and findeth Philip, and saith unto him, Follow me.

The New International Version translates the passage as:

The next day Jesus decided to leave for Galilee. Finding Philip, he said to him, "Follow me."

== Analysis ==
The "next day" is the fourth of the days tracked by John in his opening chapter. Irish Archbishop John McEvilly writes that "it would appear that Jesus found Philip either on the way or in Galilee itself. The Contemporary English Version offers a translation of this verse as "The next day Jesus decided to go to Galilee. There he met Philip ...", and Eugene Peterson likewise suggests that "when he got there, he ran across Philip".

Cornelius à Lapide notes that Galilee was known as a fishing village and it was there that Jesus sought his Apostles because the Galileans "were poor and ignoble in comparison with the Jews who were from the line of Judah, which was a royal linage". Lapide also believes that Jesus did not chance upon Philip, but found him and called him with an external calling, unlike Peter and Andrew who were called by "an inward inspiration". Alexander Maclaren notes that Philip was not himself looking for Jesus, unlike the first disciples, to whom the invitation "what do you seek?" had been addressed.

== Commentary from the Church Fathers ==
Chrysostom: "After gaining these disciples, Christ proceeded to convert others, viz. Philip and Nathanael: The day following, Jesus would go forth into Galilee."

Alcuin: "Leaving, that is, Judæa, where John was baptizing, out of respect to the Baptist, and not to appear to lower his office, so long as it continued. He was going too to call a disciple, and wished to go forth into Galilee, i. e. to a place of "transition" or "revelation", that is to say, that as He Himself increased in wisdom or stature, and in favour with God and man, and as He suffered and rose again, and entered into His glory: so He would teach His followers to go forth, and increase in virtue, and pass through suffering to joy. He findeth Philip, and saith unto him, Follow Me. Every one follows Jesus who imitates His humility and suffering, in order to be partaker of His resurrection and ascension."

Chrysostom: "Observe, He did not call them, before some had of their own accord joined Him: for had He invited them, before any had joined Him, perhaps they would have started back: but now having determined to follow of their own free choice, they remain firm ever after. He calls Philip, however, because he would be known to him, from living in Galilee. But what made Philip follow Christ? Andrew heard from John the Baptist, and Peter from Andrew; he had heard from no one; and yet on Christ saying, Follow Me, was persuaded instantly. It is not improbable that Philip may have heard John: and yet it may have been the mere voice of Christ which produced this effect."

Theophylact of Ohrid: "For the voice of Christ sounded not like a common voice to some, that is, the faithful, but kindled in their inmost soul the love of Him. Philip having been continually meditating on Christ, and reading the books of Moses, so confidently expected Him, that the instant he saw, he believed. Perhaps too he had heard of Him from Andrew and Peter, coming from the same district; an explanation which the Evangelist seems to hint at, when he adds, Now Philip was of Bethsaida, the city of Andrew and Peter."

Chrysostom: "The power of Christ appears by His gathering fruit out of a barren country. For from that Galilee, out of which there ariseth no prophet, He takes His most distinguished disciples."

Preceded by John 1:42	Gospel of John; Chapter 1	Succeeded by John 1:44
