= Torgauer Altar =

Painting by Lucas Cranach the Elder

Torgauer Altarpiece

The Torgauer Altar, Torgau Altarpiece or Altarpiece of the Holy Kinship is a triptych altarpiece painted by Lucas Cranach the Elder in 1509.

== Description ==
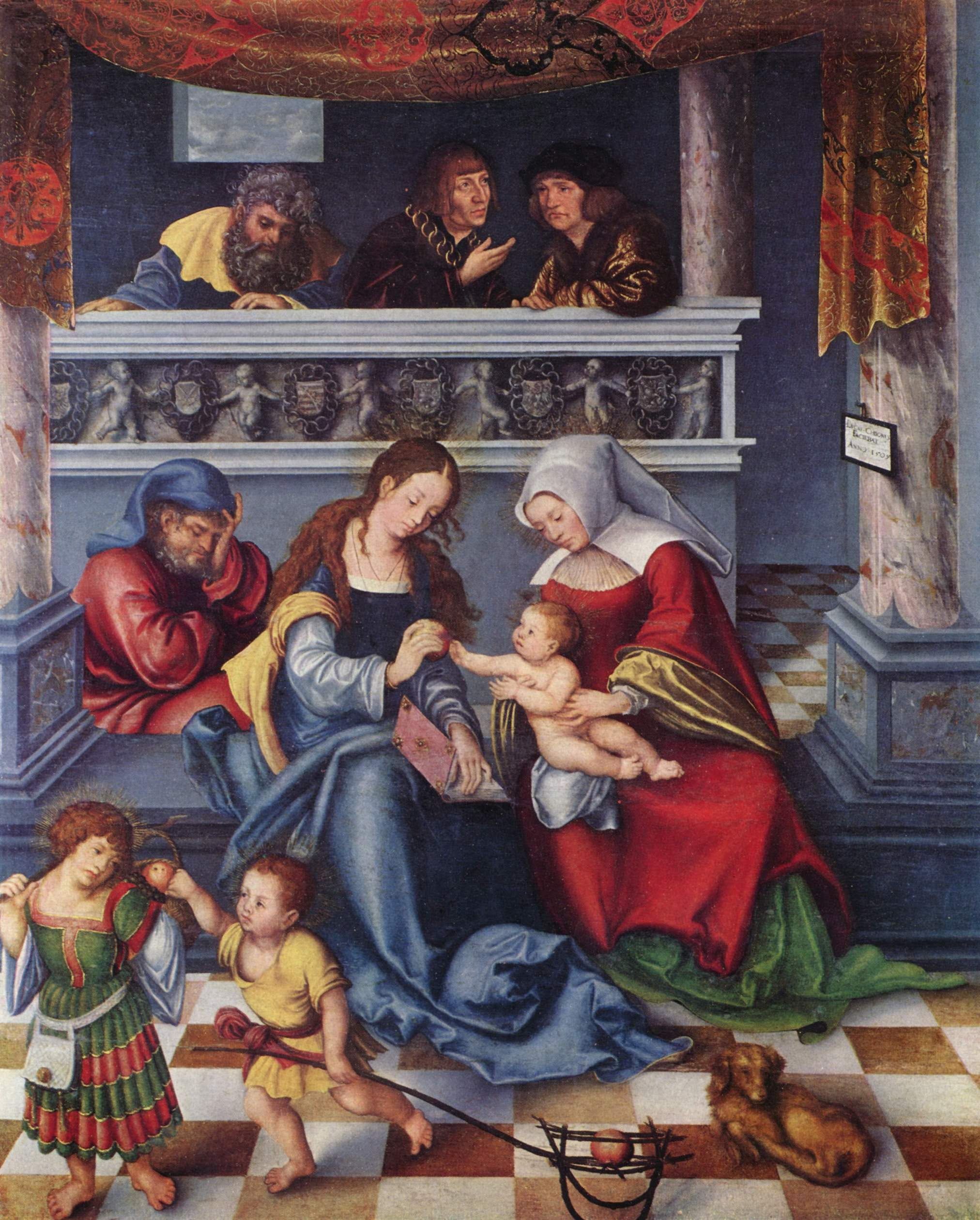
Centre panel detail

The painting includes Joseph, the Virgin, Anna and the child Christ, with Anna's three husbands in the background of the centre panel. The "Holy Kinship" is shown resting in a lavishly decorated room, including marble columns and stone benches.

The three men depicted in the gallery have been identified as having the likenesses of Emperor Maximilian (centre), Imperial Councillor Sixtus Oelhafen (right) and the artist (left).

Unusually, Lucas Cranach signed and dated the painting in Latin: LUCAS CHRONUS/FACIEBAT/ANNO 1509, visible in the notice hanging on one of the central columns. It is suggested that the choice and treatment of the subject shows that he knew the St Anne altarpiece by Quinten Metsys while still in the master's Antwerp studio. Cranach chose an explicitly German theme by means of the forested and mountainous landscape in the background, and including portraits of Emperor Maximilian, Elector Frederick the Wise and his brother, Duke John the Steadfast, among members of the Holy Family. He later painted another version of the Kinship on a single panel.

== The history of the altarpiece ==
The triptych was purchased by the Städel Museum Frankfurt in 1906 at auction in Paris.
