= Philip the Apostle =

Apostle of Jesus

Saint Philip the Apostle
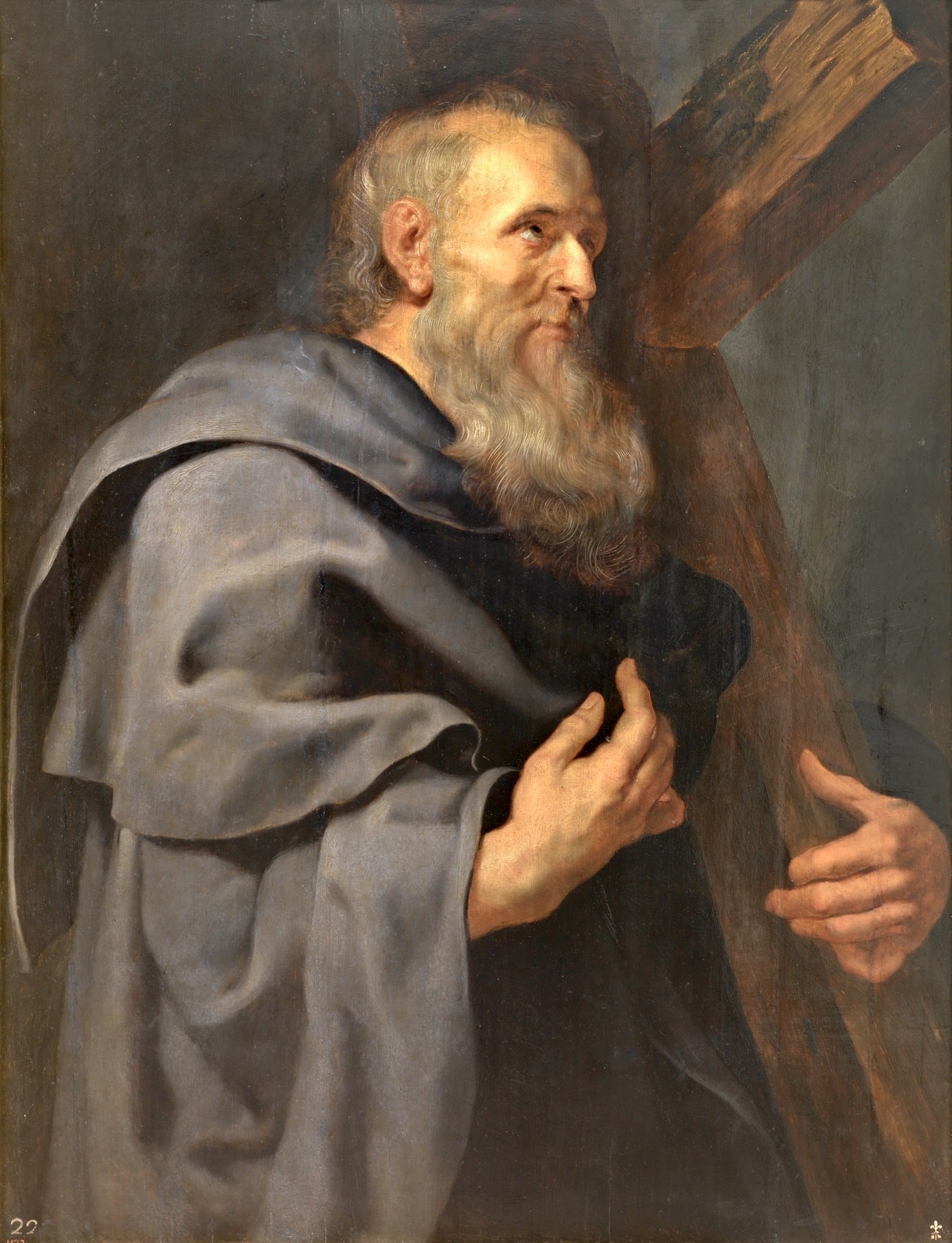
- St. Philip, by Peter Paul Rubens, from his Twelve Apostles series (c. 1611), at the Museo del Prado, Madrid

Apostle and Martyr
- Born: c. 12/15 BC; Bethsaida, Galilee, Roman Empire
- Died: AD 54/80; Hierapolis, Asia, Roman Empire
- Venerated in: All Christian denominations that venerate saints
- Canonized: Pre-congregation
- Major shrine: Collegiate Church of Saints Philip and James, Altötting; Relics in Basilica Santi Apostoli, Rome
- Feast: As Philip and James, Apostles, in the Roman Rite and in Protestant commemorations: 3 May: Roman Rite, Protestant Church in Germany; 1 May: Pre-1955 Roman Calendar,Anglican Communion, Old Catholics, ELCA, LCMS 14 November and 30 June: Eastern Orthodox Church (Translation of relics on 30 June); 17 November: Armenian; 18 November: Coptic
- Attributes: Red Martyr, elderly, bearded man, holding a basket of loaves and a Tau cross
- Patronage: Cape Verde; Hatters; Pastry chefs; San Felipe Pueblo; Uruguay

Philip the Apostle (Greek: Φίλιππος, Philippos) was one of the Twelve Apostles of Jesus according to the New Testament. Later Christian traditions describe Philip as the apostle who preached in Carthage, Greece, Syria, and Asia Minor.

In the Roman Rite, the feast day of Philip, along with that of James the Less, is traditionally observed on 1 May, the anniversary of the dedication of the church dedicated to them in Rome (now called the Church of the Twelve Apostles). In the short-lived calendar reform of 1960, it was transferred to 11 May, but since 1969 it has been assigned to 3 May. The Eastern Orthodox Church celebrates Philip's feast day on 14 November.

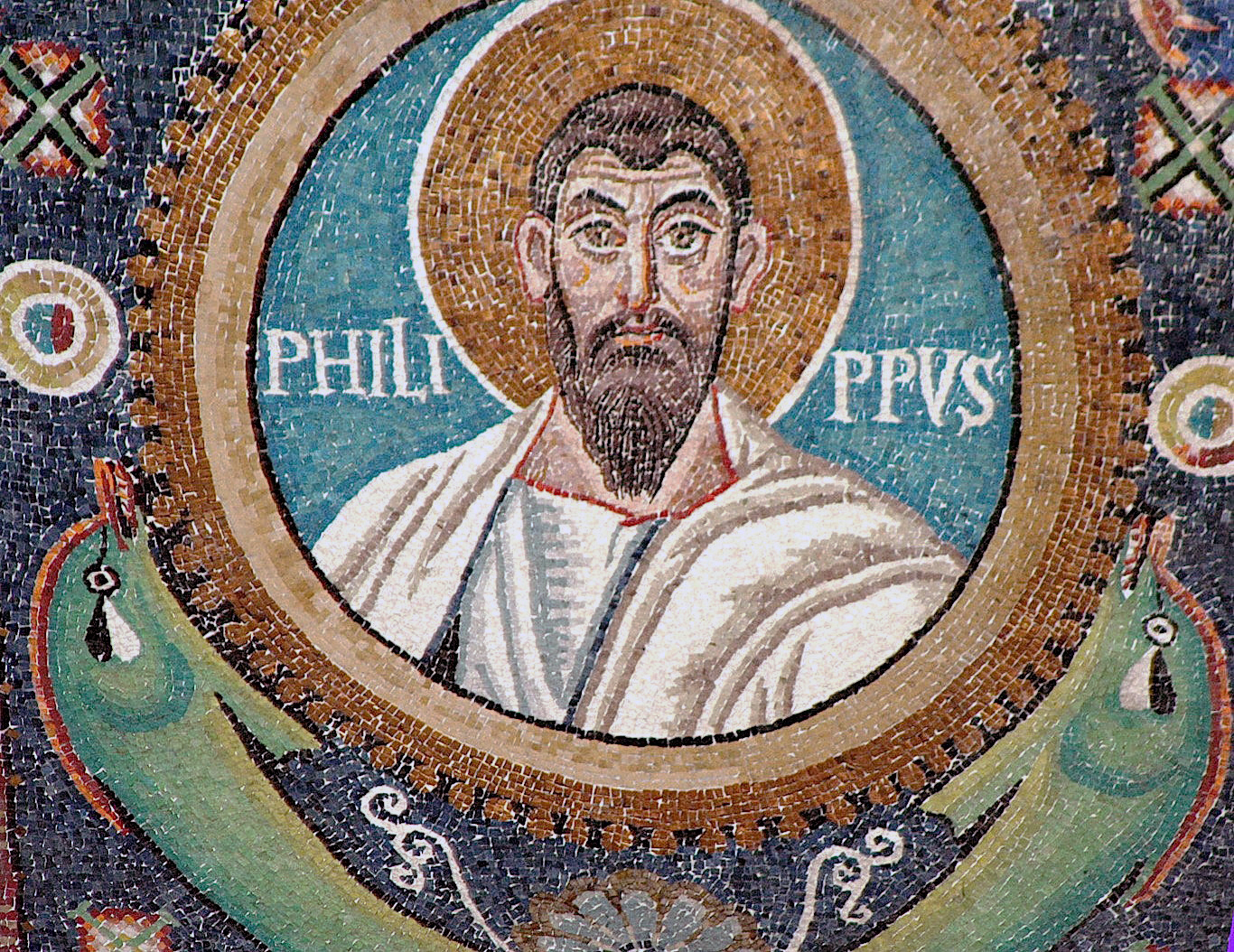
Philip the Apostle, detail of the mosaic in the Basilica of San Vitale, Ravenna, 6th century

== Life ==
=== New Testament ===
All three synoptic Gospels and the Book of Acts list Philip as one of the apostles; he is always listed on the fifth place. The Gospel of John recounts Philip's calling as a disciple of Jesus. Philip is described as a disciple from the city of Bethsaida, and the evangelist connects him with Andrew and Peter, who were from the same town. However, the Gospel of John states that Jesus found and called Philip directly, without mentioning any prior discipleship under John the Baptist (John 1:43). It was Philip who first introduced Nathanael (sometimes identified with Bartholomew) to Jesus. According to Butler, Philip was among those attending the wedding at Cana.

Of the four Gospels, Philip figures most prominently in the Gospel of John. (Note: Philip is mentioned 11 times in the New King James Version of John's Gospel, and three times in each of the other Gospels) Jesus tests Philip (John 6:6) when he asks him how to feed the 5,000 people. Later he appears as a link to the Greek community. Philip bore a Greek name, could likely speak Greek, and may have been known to the Greek pilgrims in Jerusalem. He advises Andrew that certain Greeks wish to meet Jesus, and together they inform Jesus of this (John 12:21). During the Last Supper, when Philip asked Jesus to show them the Father, he provides Jesus the opportunity to teach his disciples about the unity of the Father and the Son.

=== Early traditions ===
Eusebius, in his history of the Early Church, cites several authorities about Philip's later life. He cites Clement of Alexandria as stating that Philip, like Peter the Apostle, had married, had children, and gave his daughters in marriage. Eusebius also cites Polycrates who confirms Philip had married, had three daughters, was buried at Hieropolis along with two of his daughters while the third was buried at Ephesus.

The anonymous Acts of Philip, probably written by a contemporary of Eusebius, relates further stories about the apostle. This non-canonical book recounts the preaching and miracles of Philip. According to these accounts, following the resurrection of Jesus, Philip was sent with his sister Mariamne and Bartholomew to preach in Greece, Phrygia, and Syria. Included in the Acts of Philip is an appendix, entitled "Of the Journey of Philip the Apostle: From the Fifteenth Act Until the End, and Among Them the Martyrdom." This appendix gives an embellished account of Philip's martyrdom in the city of Hierapolis. According to this account, through a miraculous healing and his preaching Philip converted the wife of the proconsul of the city. This enraged the proconsul, and he had Philip, Bartholomew, and Mariamne all tortured. Philip and Bartholomew were then crucified upside-down, and Philip preached from his cross. As a result of Philip's preaching the crowd released Bartholomew from his cross, but Philip insisted that they not release him, and Philip died on the cross. Philip is also said to have been martyred by beheading, rather than crucifixion, in the city of Hierapolis.

=== Distinct from Philip the Evangelist ===
Philip the Apostle should not be confused with Philip the Evangelist, who was appointed with Stephen and five others to oversee charitable distributions (Acts 6:5).

== Apocryphal writings ==
One of the Gnostic texts discovered in the Nag Hammadi library in 1945 bears Philip's name in its title, on the bottom line. An early extra-biblical story about St. Philip is preserved in the apocryphal Letter from Peter to Philip, also one of the texts in the Nag Hammadi Library, and dated to the end of the 2nd century or early 3rd. This text begins with a letter from St. Peter to St. Philip, asking him to rejoin the other apostles who had gathered at the Mount of Olives. Fred Lapham believes that this letter indicates an early tradition that "at some point between the Resurrection of Jesus and the final parting of his risen presence from the disciples, Philip had undertaken a sole missionary enterprise, and was, for some reason, reluctant to return to the rest of the Apostles."

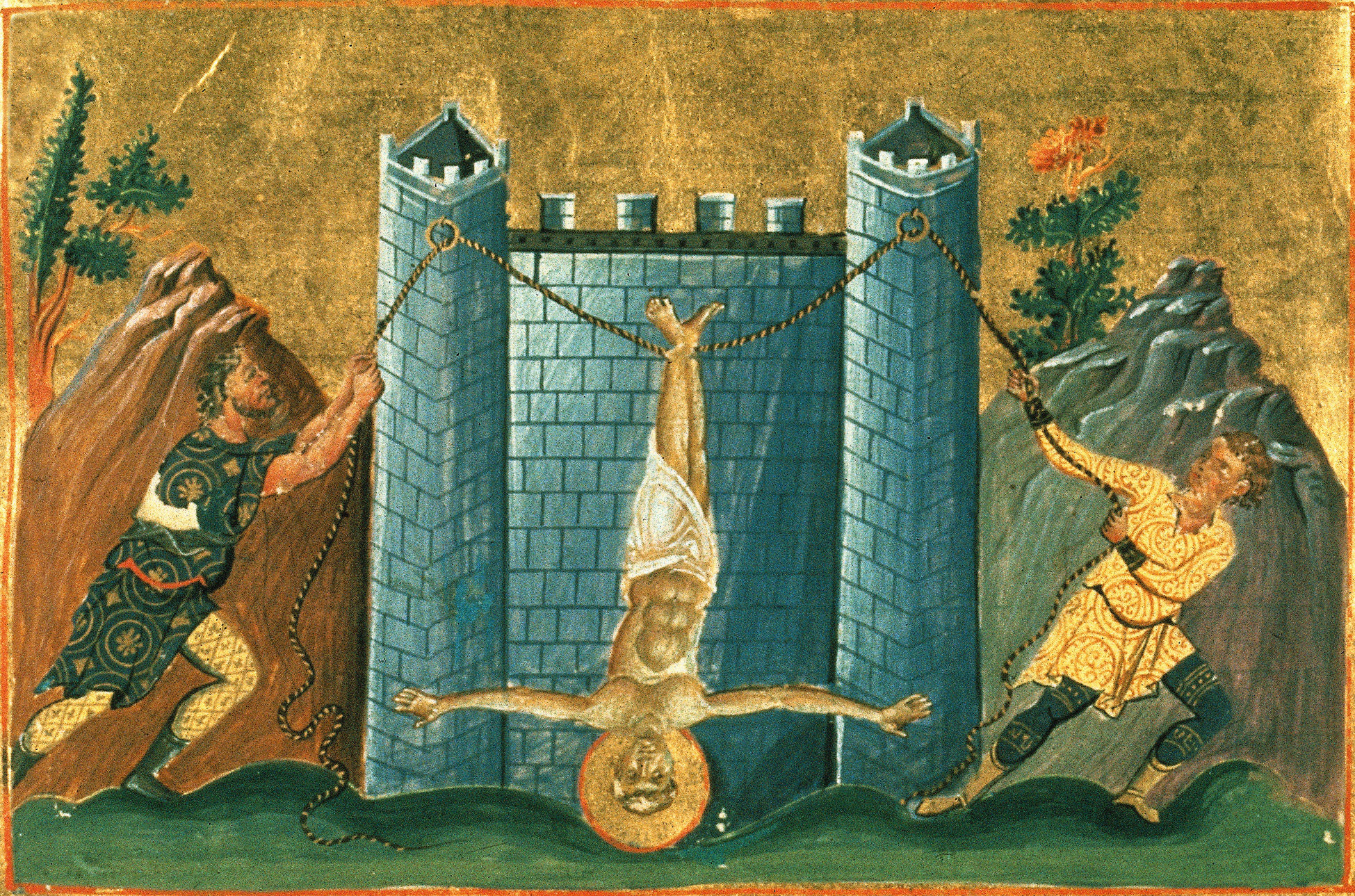
Martyrdom of Philip the Apostle. Scene from the Menologion of Basil II.

== Relics ==
The relics of Philip the Apostle are currently found in the crypt of Basilica Santi Apostoli, Rome, as well as the Church of St. Philip the Apostle in Cheektowaga, New York.

== Possible tomb location ==
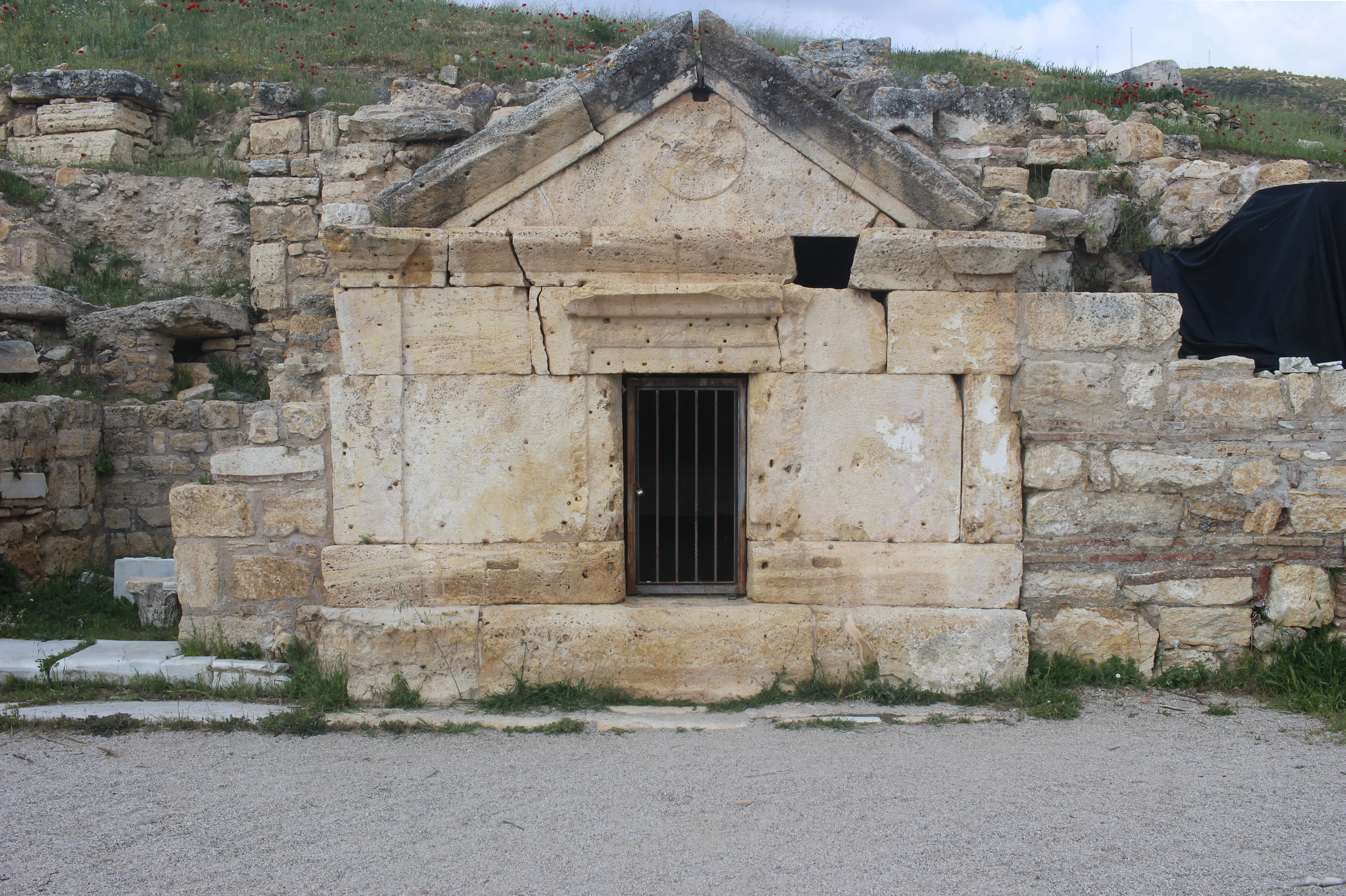
Tomb of Philip the Apostle, Hierapolis, Turkey

In 2011, Italian archaeologist Francesco D'Andria claimed to have discovered the tomb of Philip during excavations in ancient Hierapolis, close to the modern Turkish city of Denizli. The 1st-century tomb, found to be empty of relics, stood at the centre of a 4th- or 5th-century three-naved basilica, the Church of the Sepulchre, which was one of the focal points of an ancient pilgrimage hill complex dedicated to Philip. Ancient Greek prayers are carved into the walls of the tomb and church venerating Philip the Apostle, and a 6th-century bread stamp (signum pistoris) shows Philip holding bread (John 6) with a three-naved church on his left side, and the previously identified nearby martyrion church to his right, supporting the assertion that the basilica contains the original tomb of the apostle. The church built on his tomb and the martyrion church some 40 yards away were places of intense veneration for centuries: In Philip's Church of the Sepulchre the marble floors were worn down by thousands of people.

In 2012, Bartholomew, the patriarch of Constantinople and primate of the Orthodox church, celebrated the liturgy of St. Philip in the Church of the Sepulchre and in the martyrion church of the apostle.

== Iconography ==
Cross of Philip

Philip is commonly associated with the symbol of the Latin cross. Other symbols assigned to Philip include: the cross with the two loaves (because of his answer to the Lord in John 6:7), a basket filled with bread, a spear with the patriarchal cross, and a cross with a carpenter's square.

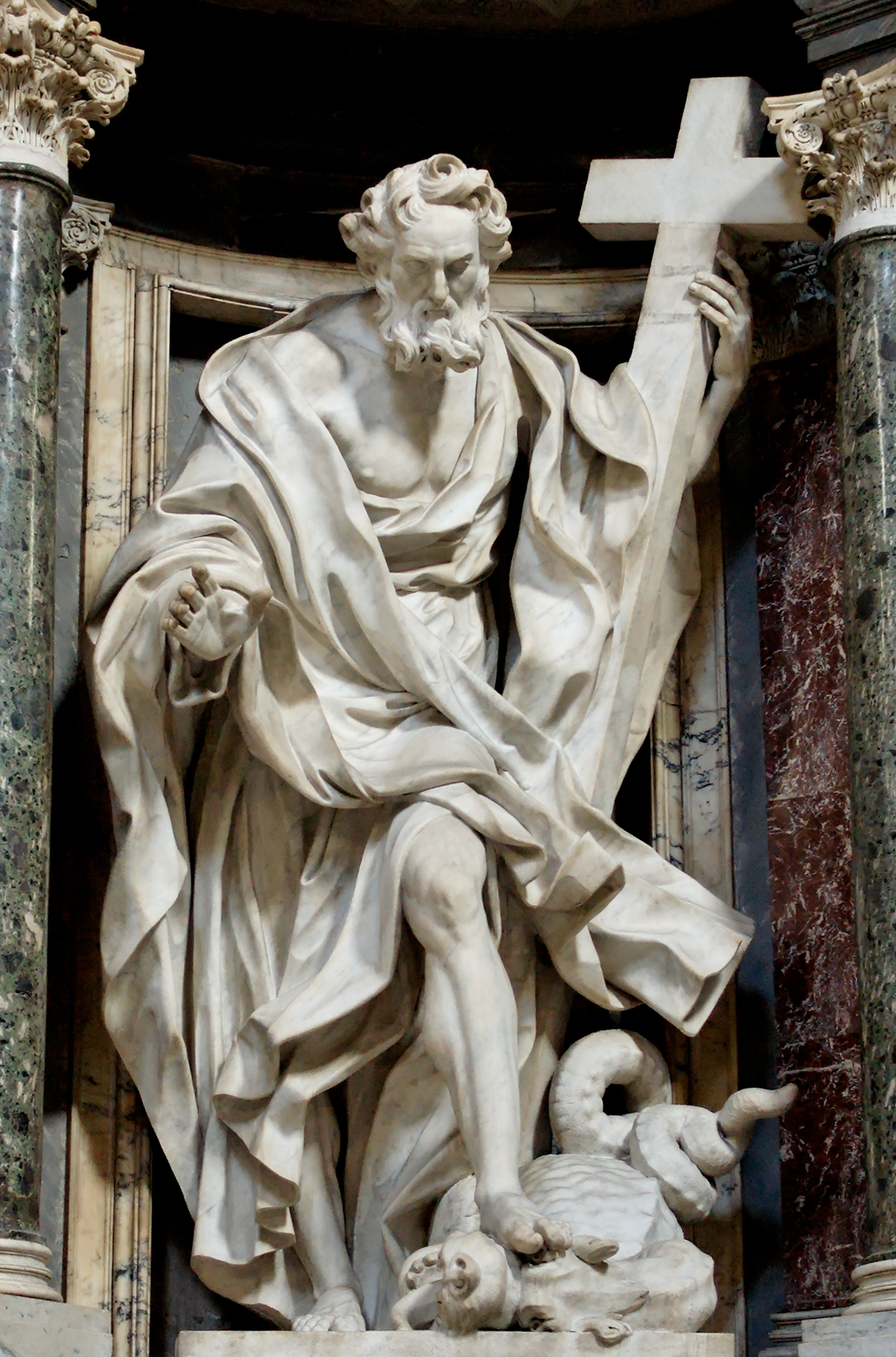
Statue of Philip in the Archbasilica of St. John Lateran by Giuseppe Mazzuoli

== Veneration ==
=== Anglicanism ===
Philip is remembered (with James the Less) in the Church of England with a Festival on 1 May.

=== Byzantine Christianity ===
The Eastern Orthodox and Greek Catholic Churches commemorate Philip on several days of the year.

- November 14: Primary Feast Day.
- June 30: Synaxis of the Twelve Apostles.
- July 31: Translation of Philip's Relics to Cyprus.

His feast day on November 14 is the day before beginning of the Nativity Fast in the Eastern Orthodox Church, which is sometimes called Philip's Fast (or the Philippian Fast). This Fast is the Eastern equivalent of Western Advent.

=== Roman Catholicism ===
Philip is remembered (with James the Less) in the Roman Catholic Church on 3 May. His feast was moved from 1 May in order to place the feast of St. Joseph the Worker on 1 May.

== Patronage ==
Saint Philip is the patron saint of hatters.

== See also ==
- Gospel of Philip
- List of biblical figures identified in extra-biblical sources
- Nordic cross flag
- Philip the Evangelist
- Saint Philip the Apostle, patron saint archive

== Notes ==
Catholic Church Titles
New creation	Bishop of Hierapolis; 1st century	Succeeded by Papias of Hierapolis
