= Mary Magdalene =

Saint and follower of Jesus

Saint Mary Magdalene
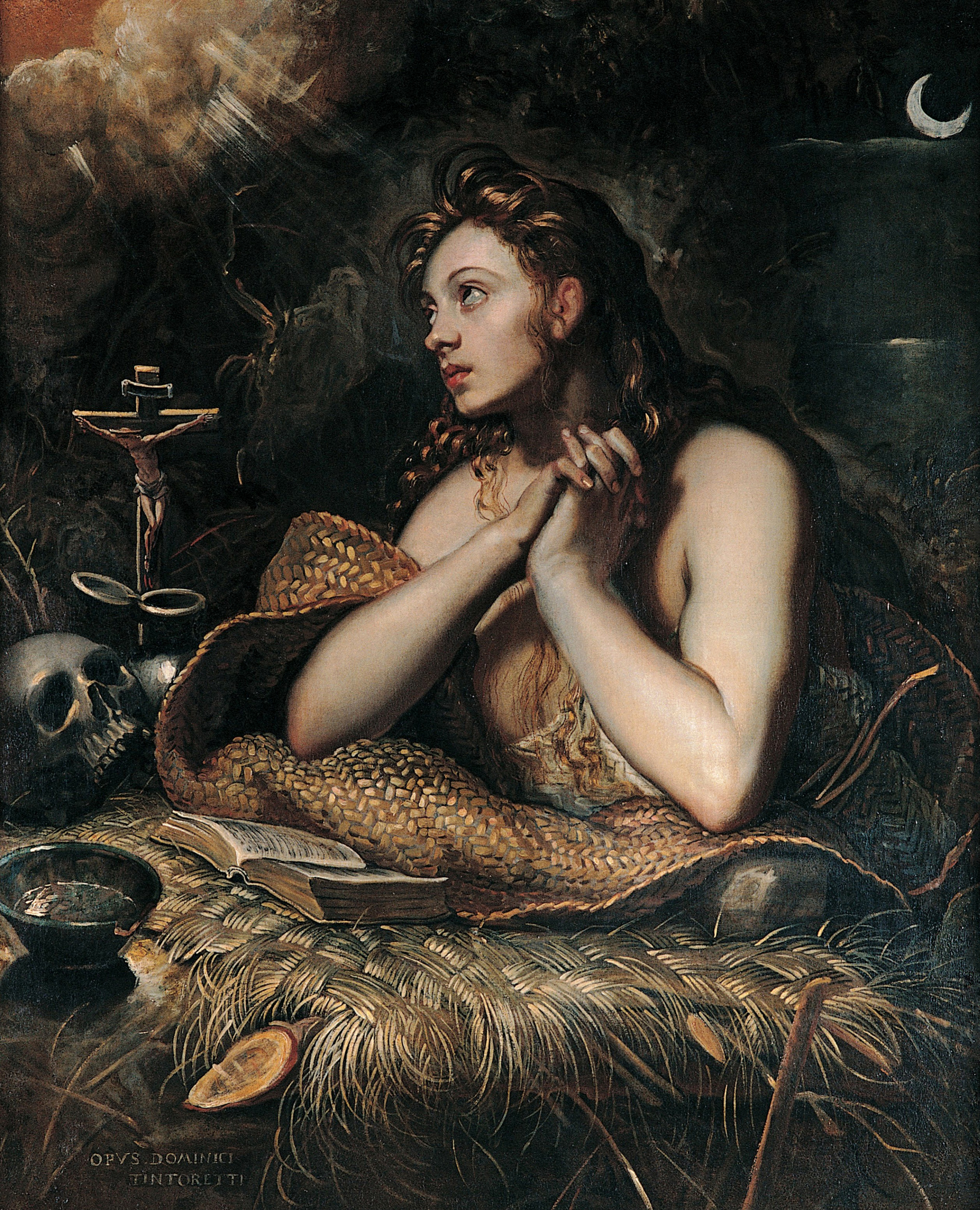
- Mary Magdalene (c. 1598) by Domenico Tintoretto, depicting her as a penitent

Apostle to the Apostles, Equal-to-the-Apostles, Myrrhbearer
- Born: Possibly Magdala, Roman Judea
- Venerated in: Catholic Church; Eastern Orthodox Church; Oriental Orthodox Churches; Anglican Communion; Lutheranism; other Protestant churches; Baháʼí Faith
- Canonized: Pre-Congregation
- Feast: 22 July
- Attributes: Western: alabaster box of ointment; Eastern: container of ointment (as a myrrhbearer), or holding a red egg (symbol of the resurrection); embracing the feet of Christ after the Resurrection
- Patronage: Apothecaries; Arahal, Spain; Atrani, Italy; Casamicciola Terme, Ischia; contemplative life; converts; Diocese of Salt Lake City; glovers; hairdressers; Kawit, Cavite; Amadeo, Cavite; Magdalena, Laguna; Santa Magdalena, Sorsogon; Santa Maria Magdalena, Hinigaran, Negros Occidental; Order of Preachers; perfumeries; people ridiculed for their piety; pharmacists; Pililla, Rizal; Provence; Maribor, Slovenia; penitent sinners; tanners; sexual temptation; women

Mary Magdalene (Note: /ˈmæɡdəlɪn, -iːn/; Biblical Hebrew: מרים המגדלית; original Biblical Greek: Μαρία ἡ Μαγδαληνή, romanized: María hē Magdalēnē, Arabic: مريم المجدلية, literally "Mary the Magdalene", Μαρία ἡ Μαγδαληνή in Matthew 27:56; 27:61; 28:1; Mark 15:40; 15:47; 16:1; 16:9 replaces "ἡ" with "τῇ" because of the case change. Luke 8:2 says "Μαρία ἡ ... Μαγδαληνή" and 24:10 says "ἡ Μαγδαληνὴ Μαρία". John 19:25, 20:1 and 20:18 all say "Μαρία ἡ Μαγδαληνή".) (sometimes called Mary of Magdala, or simply the Magdalene or the Madeleine) was a woman who, according to the four canonical gospels, travelled with Jesus as one of his followers and was a witness to his crucifixion and resurrection.

Mary Magdalene is accepted by scholars, secular and religious, as a historical figure. Her epithet is usually taken to mean that she came from Magdala, though Elizabeth Schrader Polczer and Joan Taylor have argued that Magdalene ("tower") may instead have been an honorific nickname. She is seen as a prominent follower of Jesus who was believed to have been healed by him, supported his ministry financially, and was present at his crucifixion and burial. She played a key role among his female disciples. Overall, there is limited information about her life.

During the Patristic era, Mary Magdalene was mentioned only briefly by early Church Fathers, with her image evolving from a minor gospel figure to being conflated with other women in the Bible. Eventually she became viewed in Western Christianity, largely due to Pope Gregory I's influential 591 sermon, as a repentant prostitute, despite there being no biblical basis for this portrayal.

Gnostic writings often portray Mary Magdalene as a prominent, spiritually insightful figure favoured by Jesus, challenging traditional patriarchal norms.

The Eastern Orthodox Church has always viewed Mary Magdalene as a virtuous Myrrhbearer and "Equal to the Apostles", distinct from other biblical women. The Catholic Church historically conflated her with the repentant sinner in Luke 7 but later emphasized her role as the first witness to the resurrection and honoured her as the "Apostle to the Apostles". Many alleged relics of Mary Magdalene, including her skull, a piece of forehead flesh, a tibia, and her left hand, are preserved in Catholic sites in France and Mount Athos, with notable displays and annual processions honouring them.

== Life ==
Historians, secular and religious alike agree that, like Jesus, Mary Magdalene was a real historical figure. Nonetheless, very little is known about her life. Unlike Paul the Apostle, Mary Magdalene left behind no known writings of her own. She was never mentioned in any of the Pauline epistles or in any of the general epistles. The earliest and most reliable sources about her life are the three Synoptic Gospels of Mark, Matthew, and Luke, which were all written during the first century AD.

=== During Jesus' ministry ===
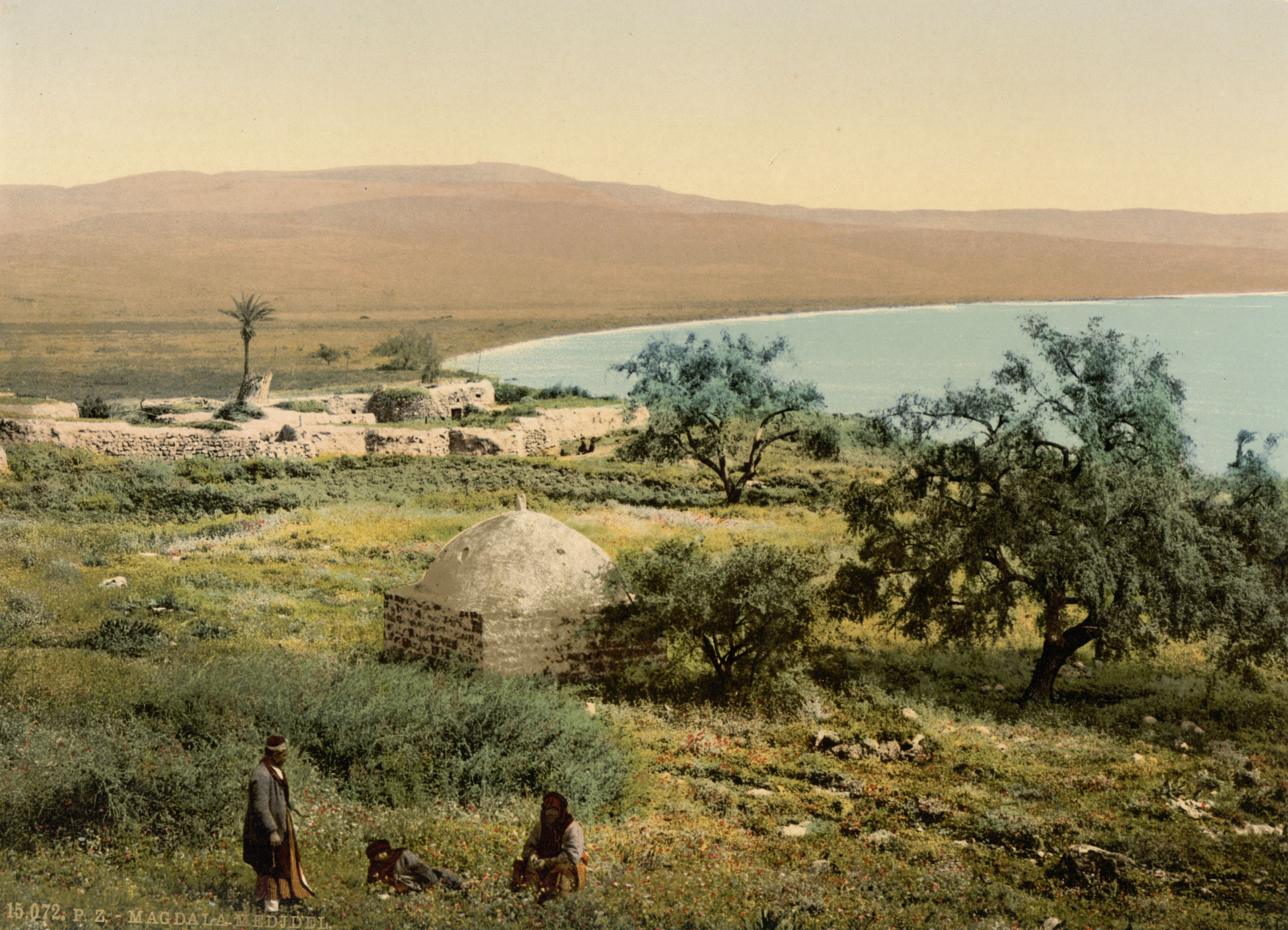
Photograph taken c. 1900 of al-Majdal, a village standing among the ruins of Magdala, Mary Magdalene's hometown

Mary Magdalene's epithet Magdalene (ἡ Μαγδαληνή; lit. 'the Magdalene') most likely means that she came from Magdala, (Note: In Hebrew Migdal (מגדל) means 'tower', 'fortress'; in Aramaic, Magdala means 'tower' or 'elevated, great, magnificent'. Meyer & de Boer 2009, pp. 74–96 provide an overview of the source texts excerpted in an essay "Should we all turn and listen to her? Mary Magdalene in the spotlight". Interpreters since the time of Jerome have suggested that Mary was called Magdalene because of her stature and faith, i.e. because she was like a tower: "Mary Magdalene received the epithet 'fortified with towers' because of her earnestness and strength of faith, and was privileged to see the rising of Christ first even before the apostles" (Haskins 2005, p. 406). Other interpreters have seen Magdalene as referring to a kind of hairstyle. This translation stems from certain passages in uncensored versions of the Talmud, where a woman, esoterically identified as Jesus's mother, is called hamegadela se'ar nasha, which has been translated "Miriam, the dresser of women's hair", possibly a euphemism for "prostitute". See Herford 2006, p. 40. The Talmudic passages are at tractate Sanhedrin 67a and tractate Hagigah 4b of the Babylonian Talmud; cf. tractate Shabbat 104b. The English theologian John Lightfoot (1602–1675) noted these passages and commented: "Whence she was called Magdalene, doth not so plainly appear; whether from Magdala, a town on the lake of Gennesaret, or from the word which signifies a plaiting or curling of the hair, a thing usual with harlots." (Lightfoot 1989, p. 373)) a village on the western shore of the Sea of Galilee which was primarily known in antiquity as a fishing town. Mary was, by far, the most common Jewish given name for girls and women during the first century, (Note: Mary Magdalene's name is mostly given as Μαρία (Maria), but in Matthew 28:1 as Μαριάμ (Mariam), Matthew 28:1–10, both of which are regarded as Greek forms of Miriam, the Hebrew name for Moses' sister. The name was extremely popular during the first century due to its connections to the ruling Hasmonean and Herodian dynasties (Good 2005, pp. 9–10). In the Gospel of John, Mary Magdalene is also referred to simply as "Mary" at least twice. John 20:11, 20:16) so it was necessary for the authors of the gospels to call her Magdalene in order to distinguish her from the other women named Mary who followed Jesus. Although the Gospel of Mark, reputed by scholars to be the earliest surviving gospel, does not mention Mary Magdalene until Jesus' crucifixion, the Gospel of Luke 8:2–3 provides a brief summary of her role during his ministry:

Soon afterwards he went on through cities and villages, proclaiming and bringing the good news of the kingdom of God. The twelve were with him, as well as some women who had been cured of evil spirits and infirmities: Mary, called Magdalene, from whom seven demons had gone out, and Joanna, the wife of Herod's steward Chuza, and Susanna, and many others, who provided for them out of their resources.

— Luke 8:1–3

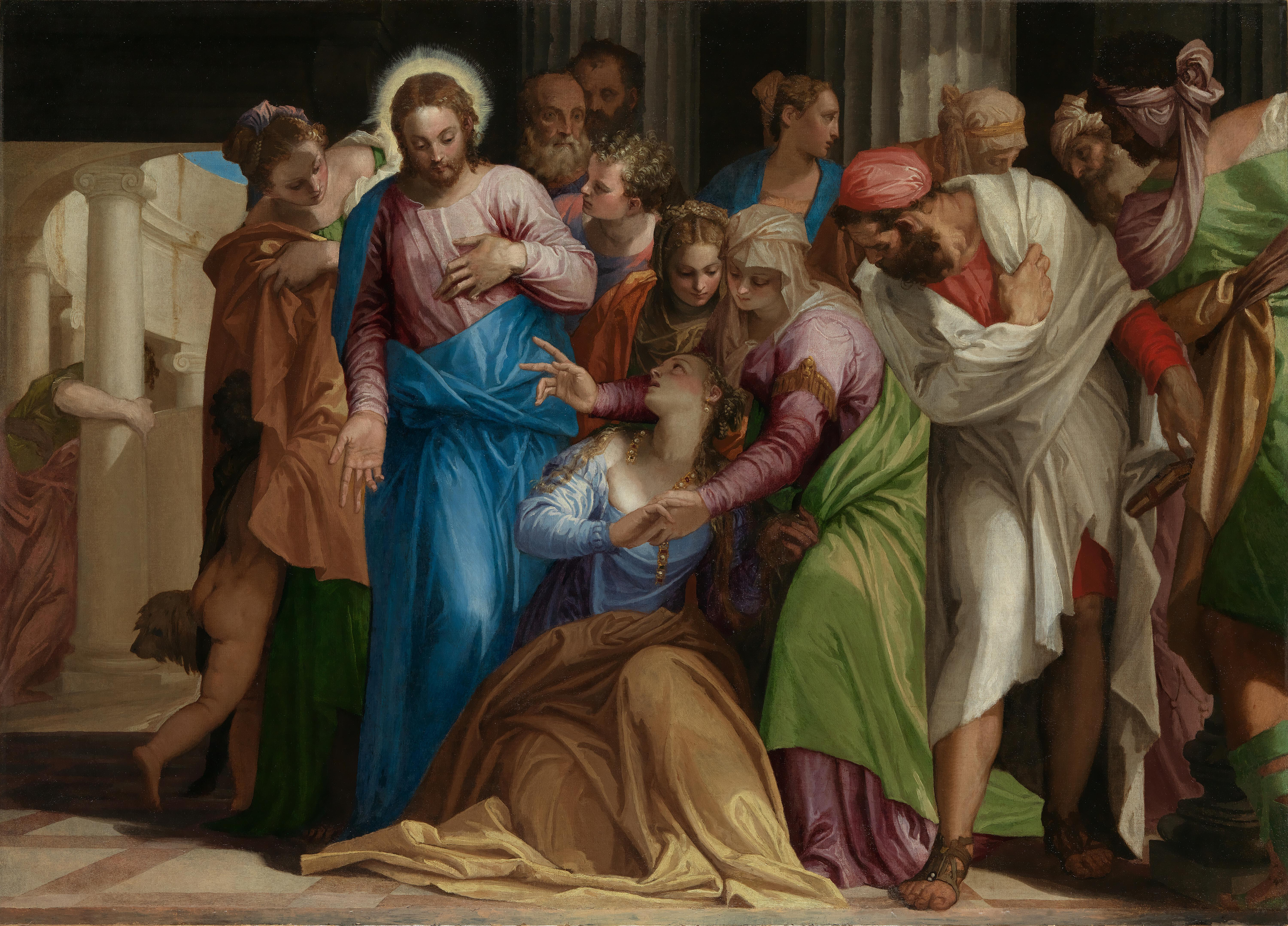
The Conversion of Mary Magdalene (c. 1548) by Paolo Veronese

According to the Gospel of Luke, Jesus exorcised "seven demons" from Mary Magdalene. That seven demons had possessed Mary is repeated in Mark 16:9, part of the "longer ending" of that gospel – this is not found in the earliest manuscripts and is possibly a second-century addition to the original text. In the first century, demons were believed widely to cause physical and psychological illness. Bruce Chilton, a scholar of early Christianity, states that the reference to the number of demons being "seven" may mean that Mary had to undergo seven exorcisms, probably over a long period of time, due to the first six being partially or wholly unsuccessful.

The number seven may be merely symbolic, since, in Jewish tradition, seven was the number of completion, so that Mary was possessed by seven demons may simply mean she was completely overwhelmed by their power. In either case, Casey and Ehrman infer that Mary must have suffered from severe emotional or psychological trauma for an exorcism of this kind to have been perceived as necessary. Consequently, her devotion to Jesus resulting from this healing must have been very strong.

Because Mary is listed as one of the women who supported Jesus' ministry financially, Casey and Ehrman conclude that she must have been relatively wealthy. The places where she and the other women are mentioned throughout the gospels indicate strongly that they were vital to Jesus' ministry and that Mary Magdalene always appears first, whenever she is listed in the Synoptic Gospels as a member of a group of women, indicates that she was seen as the most important out of all of them. Carla Ricci notes that, in lists of the disciples, Mary Magdalene occupies a similar position among Jesus' female followers as Simon Peter does among the male apostles.

=== Witness to Jesus's crucifixion and burial ===
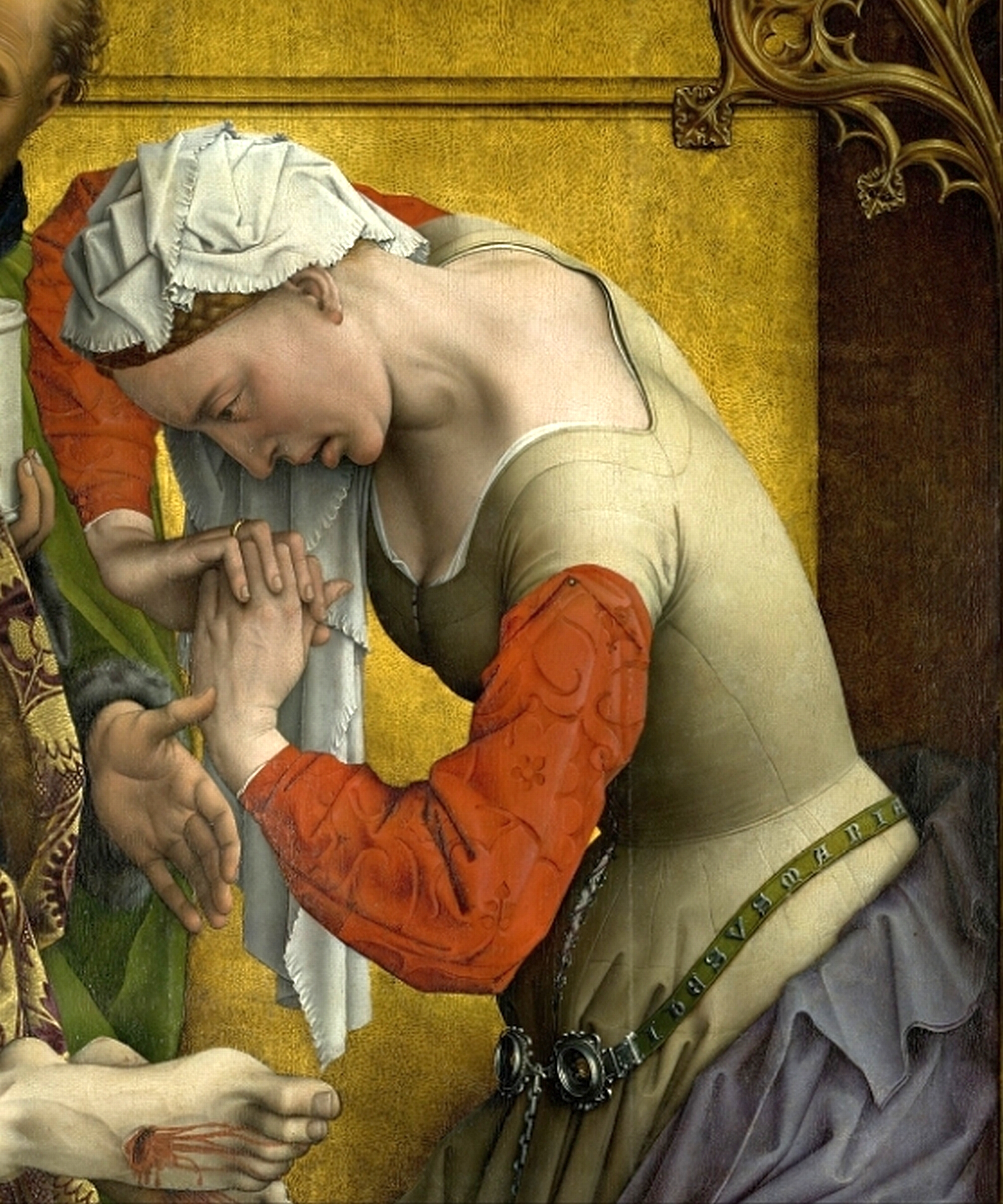
Detail of Mary Magdalene weeping at the crucifixion of Jesus, as portrayed in The Descent from the Cross (c. 1435) by the Flemish artist Rogier van der Weyden

All four canonical gospels agree that several women watched Jesus's crucifixion from a distance, with three explicitly naming Mary Magdalene as present. Mark 15:40 lists the names of these women as Mary Magdalene; Mary, mother of James; and Salome. Matthew 27:55–56 lists Mary Magdalene, Mary mother of James and Joseph, and the unnamed mother of the sons of Zebedee (who may be the same person Mark calls Salome). Luke 23:49 mentioned a group of women watching the crucifixion, but did not give any of their names. John 19:25 lists Mary, mother of Jesus, her sister, Mary, wife of Clopas, and Mary Magdalene as witnesses to the crucifixion.

Virtually all reputable historians agree that Jesus was crucified by the Romans under the orders of Pontius Pilate. James Dunn states of baptism and crucifixion that these "two facts in the life of Jesus command almost universal assent". Nonetheless, the gospels' accounts of Jesus's crucifixion differ. Ehrman states that the presence of Mary Magdalene and the other women at the cross is probably historical because Christians would have been unlikely to make up that the main witnesses to the crucifixion were women and also because their presence is attested in both the Synoptic Gospels and in the Gospel of John independently. Maurice Casey concurs that the presence of Mary Magdalene and the other women at the crucifixion of Jesus may be recorded as a historical fact. According to E. P. Sanders, the reason why the women watched the crucifixion even after the male disciples had fled may have been because they were less likely to be arrested, they were braver than the men, or some combination thereof.

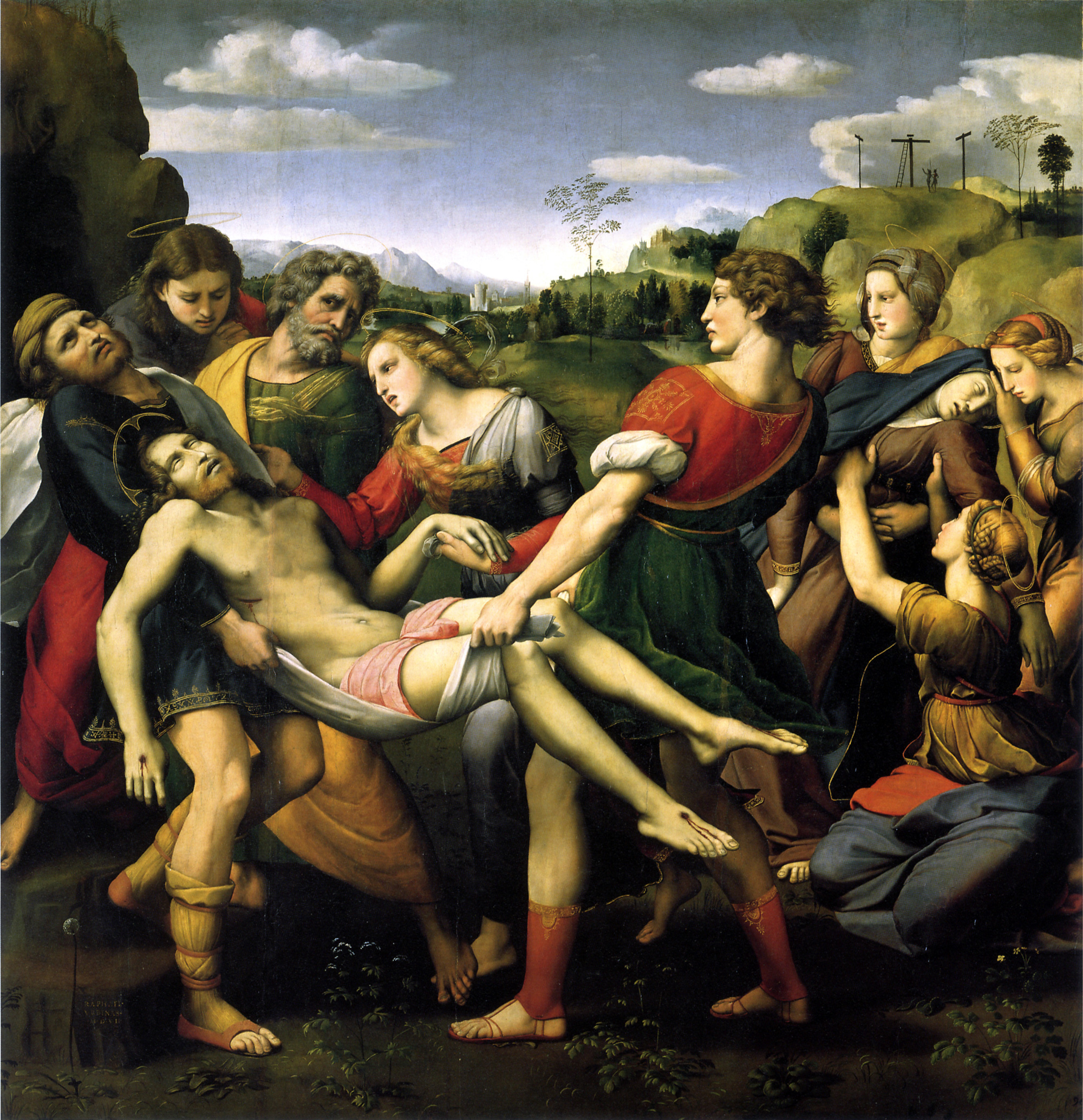
The Deposition (1507) by Raphael, showing a distressed, reddish-blond-haired Mary Magdalene dressed in fine clothes clutching the hand of Jesus's body as he is carried to the tomb

All four canonical gospels agree that Jesus's body was taken down from the cross and buried by a man named Joseph of Arimathea. Mark 15:47 lists Mary Magdalene and Mary, mother of Josus (not Jesus, explicitly identified as a different Mary) as witnesses to the burial of Jesus. Matthew 27:61 lists Mary Magdalene and "the other Mary" as witnesses. Luke 23:55 mentions "the women who had followed him from Galilee", but does not list any of their names. John 19:39–42 does not mention any women present during Joseph's burial of Jesus, but does mention the presence of Nicodemus, a Pharisee with whom Jesus had a conversation near the beginning of the gospel. Ehrman, who previously accepted the story of Jesus's burial as historical, now rejects it as a later invention on the basis that Roman governors almost never allowed for executed criminals to be given any kind of burial and Pontius Pilate in particular was not "the sort of ruler who would break with tradition and policy when kindly asked by a member of the Jewish council to provide a decent burial for a crucified victim". Casey argues that Jesus was given a proper burial by Joseph of Arimathea, noting that, on some very rare occasions, Roman governors did release the bodies of executed prisoners for burial. Nonetheless, he rejects that Jesus could have been interred in an expensive tomb with a stone rolled in front of it like the one described in the gospels, leading him to conclude that Mary and the other women must not have seen the tomb. Sanders affirms Jesus's burial by Joseph of Arimathea in the presence of Mary Magdalene and the other female followers as completely historical.

=== Resurrection of Jesus ===
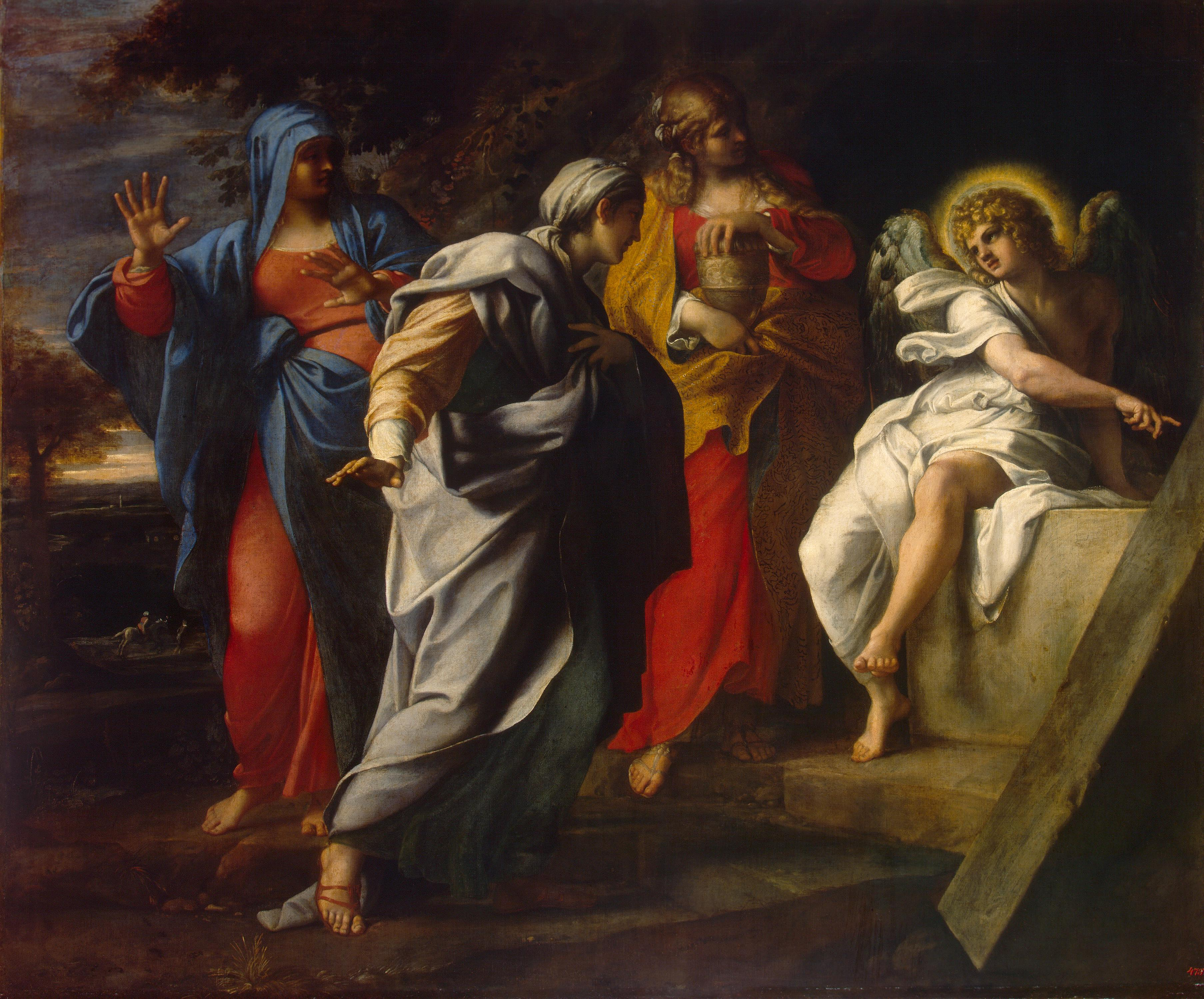
Holy Women at Christ's Tomb (c. 1590) by Annibale Carracci. In Matthew 28:1–10, Mary Magdalene and "the other Mary" encounter an angel at the tomb, who tells them that Christ has risen.

The earliest description of Jesus's post-resurrection appearances is a quotation of a pre-Pauline creed preserved by Paul the Apostle in 1 Corinthians 15:

For I handed on to you as of first importance what I in turn had received: that Christ died for our sins in accordance with the scriptures and that he was buried and that he was raised on the third day in accordance with the scriptures and that he appeared to Cephas, then to the twelve. Then he appeared to more than five hundred brothers and sisters at one time, most of whom are still alive, though some have died. Then he appeared to James, then to all the apostles.

— 1 Corinthians 15:3–7, NRSVue

Unlike the gospel accounts, this does not mention Mary Magdalene or the other women as first to discover the tomb empty. N. T. Wright argues that since women were sometimes not recognised as legal witnesses in the ancient world, the formula omits them.

According to Mark 16:1–8, the earliest account of the discovery of the empty tomb, Mary Magdalene, Mary the mother of James, and Salome went to the tomb just after sunrise, a day and half after Jesus's burial and found that the stone had already been rolled away. They went inside and saw a young man dressed in white, who told them that Jesus had risen from the dead and instructed them to tell the disciples that he would meet them in Galilee. Instead, the women ran away and told no one, because they were too afraid. The original text of the gospel ends here, without the resurrected Jesus making an appearance to anyone. Casey argues that the reason for this abrupt ending may be because the Gospel of Mark is an unfinished first draft.

According to Matthew 28:1–10, Mary Magdalene and "the other Mary" went to the tomb. An earthquake occurred and an angel dressed in white descended from Heaven and rolled aside the stone as the women were watching. The angel told them that Jesus had risen from the dead. Then the risen Jesus himself appeared to the women as they were leaving the tomb and told them to tell the other disciples that he would meet them in Galilee.

According to Luke 24:1–12 Mary Magdalene, Joanna, and Mary the mother of James went to the tomb and found the stone already rolled away, as in Mark. They went inside and saw two young men dressed in white who told them that Jesus had risen from the dead. Then they went and told the eleven remaining apostles, who dismissed their story as nonsense. Luke does not mention an appearance to the women. He recounts the appearance to Cleopas and an unnamed "disciple" on the road to Emmaus in Luke 24:13–35 and implies another to Simon in Luke 24:34 when the Emmaus travellers return to find that the other disciples already know. Luke's narrative also removes the injunction for the women to tell the disciples to return to Galilee and instead has Jesus tell the disciples not to return to Galilee, but rather to stay in the precincts of Jerusalem.

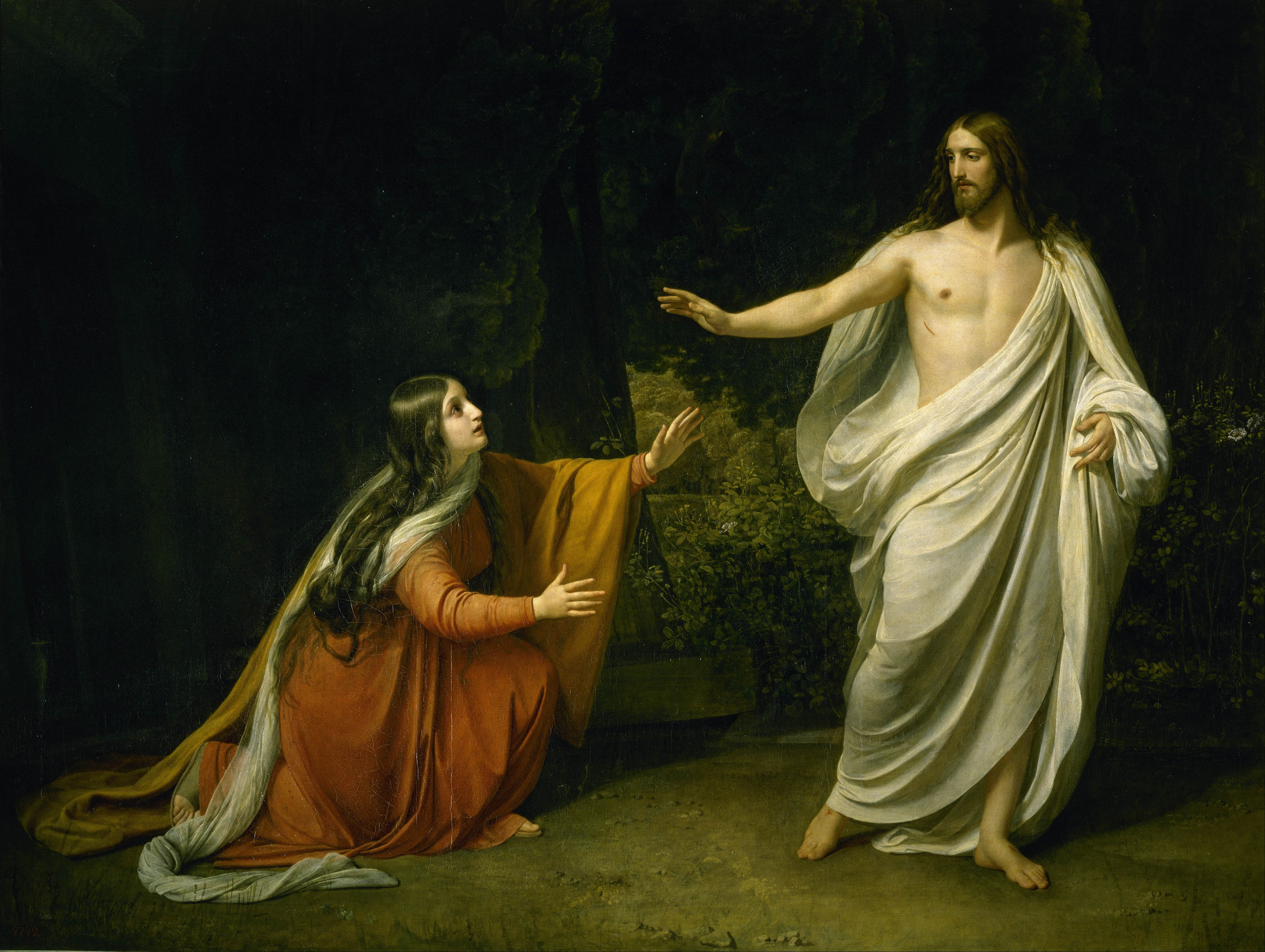
Christ's Appearance to Mary Magdalene after the Resurrection (1835) by Alexander Andreyevich Ivanov. In John 20:1–13, Mary Magdalene sees the risen Jesus alone and he tells her "Don't touch me, for I have not yet ascended to my father."

Mary Magdalene's role in the resurrection narrative is more prominent in the account from the Gospel of John. According to John 20:1–10, Mary Magdalene went to the tomb twice. The first time, when it was still dark, they saw that the stone had already been rolled away and saw no-one. She immediately ran to tell Peter and the "beloved disciple". She mentions to John that "we" do not know where they put him, implying she was not alone. Keener notes that John almost certainly knew of the tradition that there were multiple women, but focuses on Mary. Peter and the beloved disciple came with her to the tomb and confirmed that it was empty, but returned home without seeing the risen Jesus. According to John 20:11–18, Mary, now alone in the garden outside the tomb, saw two angels sitting where Jesus's body had been. Then the risen Jesus approached her. She at first mistook him for the gardener, but, after she heard him say her name, she recognized him and cried out "Rabbouni!" (which is Aramaic for 'teacher'). His next words may be translated as "Don't touch me, for I have not yet ascended to my Father" or "Stop clinging to me, [etc.]". D. A. Carson argues for the second rendering because the Greek present-tense prohibition does not by itself settle the question, but the context suggests that Mary is already grasping Jesus, and the words stand in deliberate contrast to Jesus's invitation to Thomas to touch him a week later (see John 20:24–29). Jesus then sent her to tell the other apostles the good news of his resurrection. The Gospel of John therefore, portrays Mary Magdalene as the first apostle, the apostle sent to the apostles. Because she was the first to witness Jesus's resurrection, Mary Magdalene is known in some Christian traditions as the "apostle to the apostles".

The oldest manuscripts of Mark end abruptly, and later copies contain additional material called the "shorter ending" and the "longer ending". In the "shorter ending", which precedes the longer one in nearly all witnesses except Codex Bobiensis, they report to Peter and afterwards Jesus sends the "sacred and imperishable proclamation of salvation" "through them" (the women) to the world. Casey describes this ending as "very forced" because it contradicts the last verse of the original gospel, stating that the women "told no one". The "longer ending", which is found in most surviving manuscripts, could be an "amalgam of traditions" containing episodes derived from the other gospels. First, it describes an appearance by Jesus to Mary Magdalene alone (as in the Gospel of John), followed by brief descriptions of him appearing to the two disciples on the road to Emmaus (as in the Gospel of Luke) and to the eleven remaining disciples (as in the Gospel of Matthew).

In his book published in 2006, Ehrman states that "it appears virtually certain" that the stories of the empty tomb, regardless of whether or not they are accurate, can definitely be traced back to the historical Mary Magdalene, saying that, in Jewish society, women were regarded as unreliable witnesses and were forbidden from giving testimony in court, so early Christians would have had no motive to make up a story about a woman being the first to discover the empty tomb. In fact, if they had made the story up, they would have had strong motivation to make Peter, Jesus's closest disciple while he was alive, the discoverer of the tomb instead. He also says that the story of Mary Magdalene discovering the empty tomb is independently attested in the Synoptics, the Gospel of John, and in the Gospel of Peter. N. T. Wright states that, "it is, frankly, impossible to imagine that [the women at the tomb] were inserted into the tradition after Paul's day."

Casey challenges this argument, contending that the women at the tomb are not legal witnesses, but rather heroines in line with a long Jewish tradition. He contends that the story of the empty tomb was invented by either the author of the Gospel of Mark or by one of his sources, based on the historically genuine fact that the women really had been present at Jesus's crucifixion and burial. In his book published in 2014, Ehrman rejects his own previous argument, stating that the story of the empty tomb can only be a later invention because there is virtually no possibility that Jesus's body could have been placed in any kind of tomb and, if Jesus was never buried, then no one alive at the time could have said that his non-existent tomb had been found empty. He concludes that the idea that early Christians would have had "no motive" to make up the story simply "suffers from a poverty of imagination" and that they would have had all kinds of possible motives, especially since women were overrepresented in early Christian communities and women themselves would have had strong motivation to make up a story about other women being the first to find the tomb. He does conclude later, however, that Mary Magdalene must have been one of the people who had an experience in which she thought she saw the risen Jesus, citing her prominence in the gospel resurrection narratives and her absence everywhere else in the gospels as evidence.

== Legacy ==
=== Patristic era ===
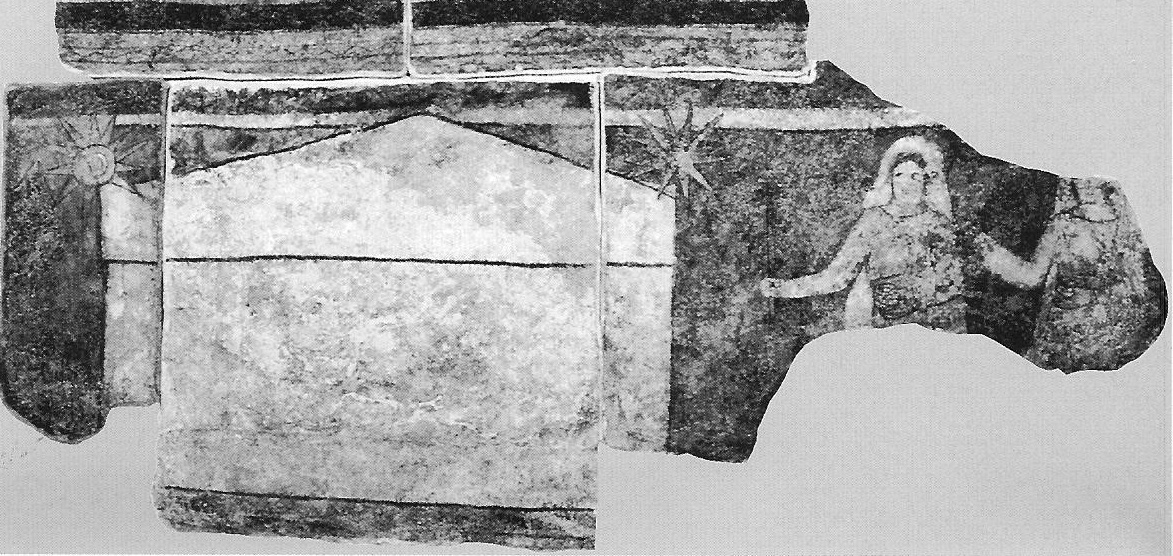
This fresco from the nave of the Dura-Europos church dates to c. 240 and contains the oldest surviving depiction of Mary Magdalene. She is shown alongside two other women (the third now almost completely missing due to extensive damage), each holding a lit torch and a bowl of myrrh, as they approach Jesus's tomb, which is still sealed.

Most of the earliest Church Fathers do not mention Mary Magdalene, and those who do mention her usually only discuss her very briefly. In his anti-Christian polemic The True Word, written between 170 and 180, the pagan philosopher Celsus declared that Mary Magdalene was nothing more than "a hysterical female... who either dreamt in a certain state of mind and through wishful thinking had a hallucination due to some mistaken notion (an experience which has happened to thousands), or, which is more likely, wanted to impress others by telling this fantastic tale, and so by this cock-and-bull story to provide a chance for other beggars". The Church Father Origen (c. 184 – c. 253) defended Christianity against this accusation in his apologetic treatise Against Celsus, mentioning Matthew 28:1, which lists Mary Magdalene and "the other Mary" both seeing the resurrected Jesus, thus providing a second witness. Origen also preserves a statement from Celsus that some Christians in his day followed the teachings of a woman named "Mariamme", who is almost certainly Mary Magdalene. Origen merely dismisses this, remarking that Celsus "pours on us a heap of names".

A sermon attributed to Hippolytus of Rome (c. 170 – 235) refers to Mary of Bethany and her sister Martha seeking Jesus in the garden like Mary Magdalene in John 20, indicating a conflation between Mary of Bethany and Mary Magdalene. The sermon describes the conflated woman as a "second Eve" who compensates for the disobedience of the first Eve through her obedience. The sermon also explicitly identifies Mary Magdalene and the other women as "apostles". The first clear identification of Mary Magdalene as a redeemed sinner comes from Ephrem the Syrian (c. 306 – 373). Part of the reason for the identification of Mary Magdalene as a sinner may derive from the reputation of her birthplace, Magdala, which, by the late first century, was infamous for its inhabitants' alleged vice and licentiousness.

In one of his preserved sayings, Gregory of Nyssa (c. 330 – 395) identifies Mary Magdalene as "the first witness to the resurrection, that she might set straight again by her faith in the resurrection, what was turned over in her transgression". Ambrose (c. 340 – 397), by contrast, not only rejected the conflation of Mary Magdalene, Mary of Bethany, and the anointing sinner, but even proposed that the authentic Mary Magdalene was, in fact, two separate people: one woman named Mary Magdalene who discovered the empty tomb and a different Mary Magdalene who saw the risen Christ. Augustine of Hippo (354–430) entertained the possibility that Mary of Bethany and the unnamed sinner from Luke might be the same person, but did not associate Mary Magdalene with either of them. Instead, Augustine praised Mary Magdalene as "unquestionably... surpassingly more ardent in her love than these other women who had administered to the Lord".

=== Portrayal as a prostitute ===
The portrayal of Mary Magdalene as a prostitute began in 591, when Pope Gregory I identified Mary Magdalene, who was introduced in Luke 8:2, with Mary of Bethany (Luke 10:39) and the unnamed "sinful woman" who anointed Jesus's feet in Luke 7:36–50. Pope Gregory's Easter sermon resulted in a widespread belief that Mary Magdalene was a repentant prostitute or promiscuous woman.

Her reputation in Western Christianity as being a repentant prostitute or loose woman do not appear in the canonical gospels, which do not imply that she had been a prostitute or notable for a sinful way of life. The belief probably arose due to a conflation between Mary Magdalene, Mary of Bethany (who anoints Jesus's feet in John 12:1–8), and the unnamed "sinful woman" who anoints Jesus's feet in Luke 7:36–50. As early as the third century, the Church Father Tertullian (c. 160 – 225) references the touch of "the woman which was a sinner" in effort to prove that Jesus "was not a phantom, but really a solid body". This may indicate that Mary Magdalene was already being conflated with the "sinful woman" in Luke 7:36–50, though Tertullian never identifies the woman of whom he speaks as Mary Magdalene.

Elaborate medieval legends from Western Europe then emerged, which told exaggerated tales of Mary Magdalene's wealth and beauty, as well as of her alleged journey to southern Gaul (modern-day France). The identification of Mary Magdalene with Mary of Bethany and the unnamed "sinful woman" was a major controversy in the years leading up to the Reformation, and some Protestant leaders rejected it. During the Counter-Reformation, the Catholic Church emphasized Mary Magdalene as a symbol of penance. In 1969, Pope Paul VI removed the identification of Mary Magdalene with Mary of Bethany and the "sinful woman" from the General Roman Calendar, but the view of her as a former prostitute has persisted in popular culture.

=== Early Middle Ages ===
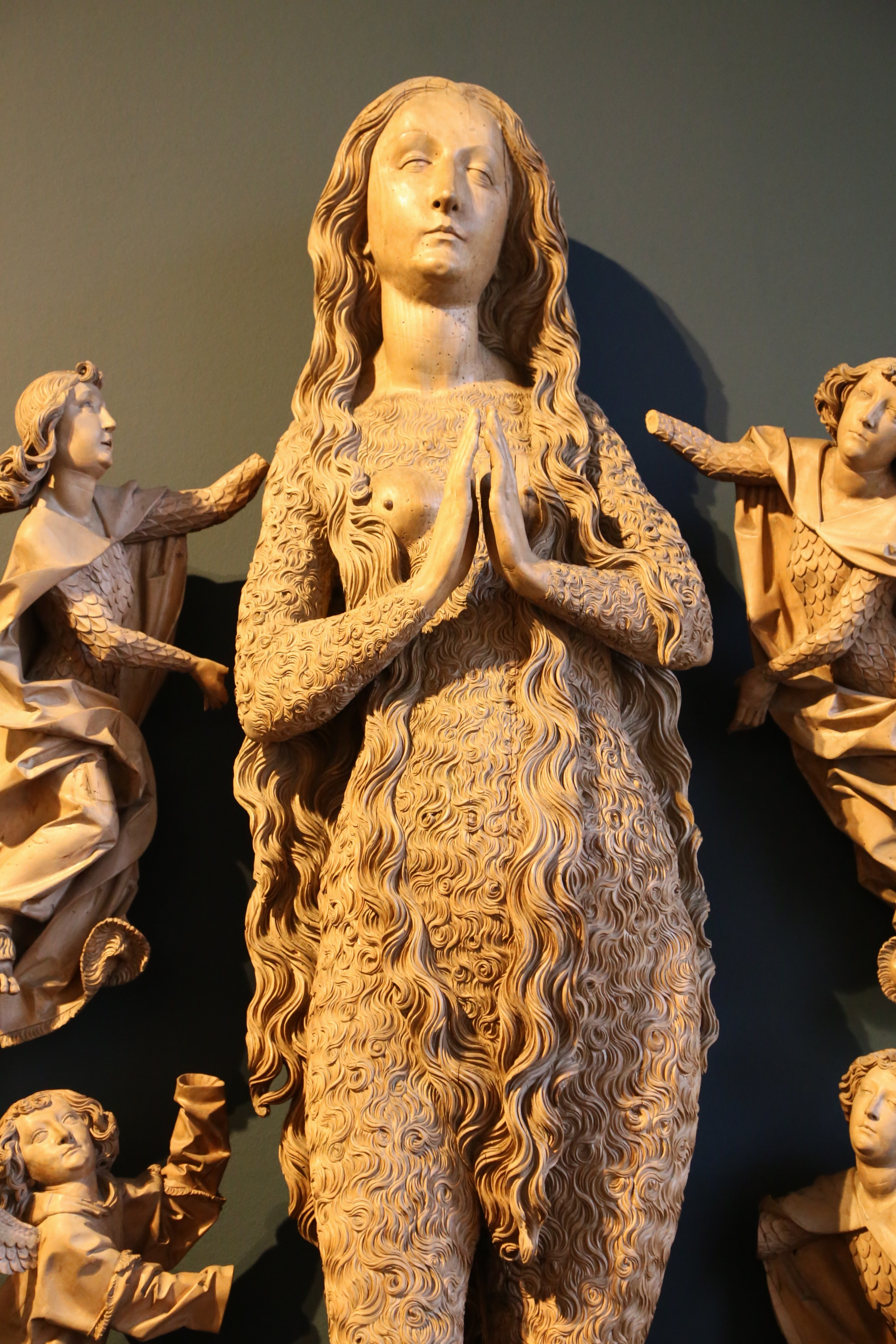
Ascension of Mary Magdalene by Tilman Riemenschneider (1490–1492).
A depiction of Mary Magdalene with thick body hair.

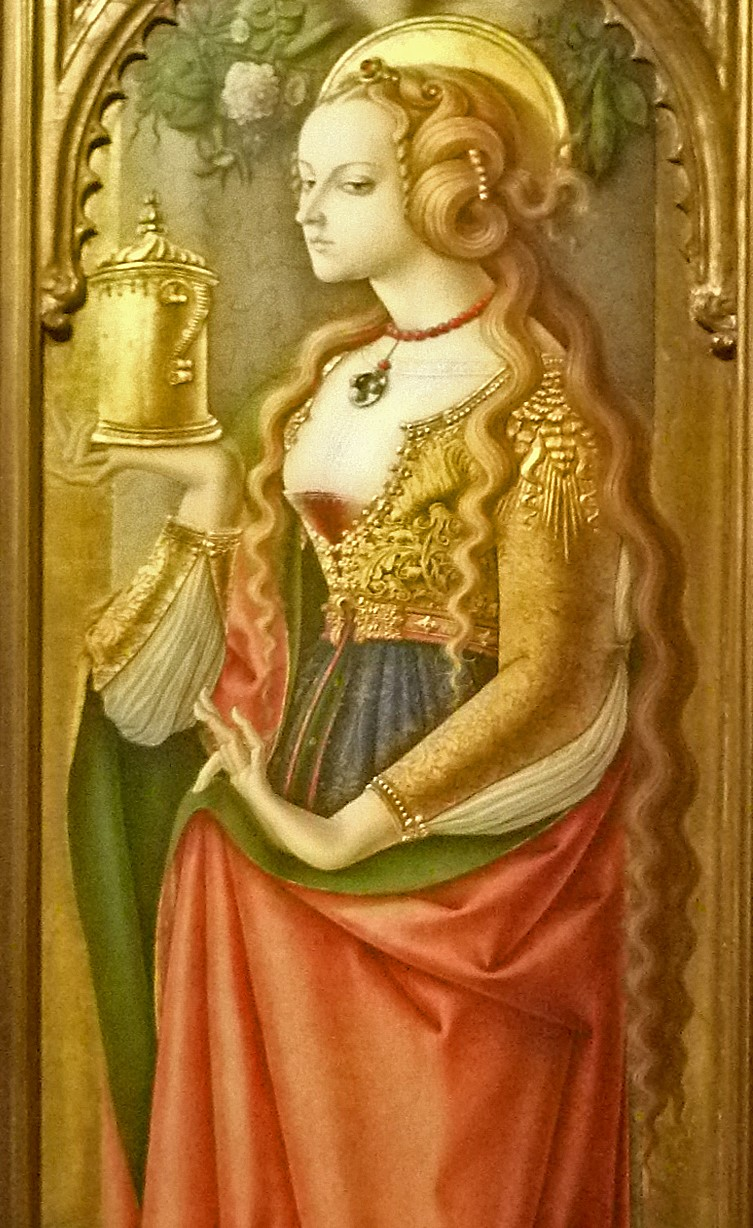
Mary Magdalene (c. 1480–1487), altarpiece in International Gothic style by Carlo Crivelli showing her with long, blonde hair

The unnamed "sinful woman" in Luke 7:36–50 is never identified as a prostitute and, in Jewish society at the time the gospel was written, "sinful" could have meant that she "did not assiduously observe the law of Moses". The motif of Mary Magdalene specifically being a former prostitute or loose woman dates to a narrative in an influential homily by Pope Gregory I ("Gregory the Great") in around 591, in which he identifies Magdalene with the anonymous sinner with the perfume in Luke's gospel and with Mary of Bethany, the sister of Martha and Lazarus, and for the first time, explicitly identifies her sins as ones of a sexual nature:

She whom Luke calls the sinful woman, whom John calls Mary, we believe to be the Mary from whom seven devils were ejected according to Mark. What did these seven devils signify, if not all the vices? It is clear, that the woman previously used the unguent to perfume her flesh in forbidden acts. What she therefore displayed more scandalously, she was now offering to God in a more praiseworthy manner. She had coveted with earthly eyes, but now through penitence these are consumed with tears. She displayed her hair to set off her face, but now her hair dries her tears. She had spoken proud things with her mouth, but in kissing the Lord's feet, she now planted her mouth on the Redeemer's feet. For every delight, therefore, she had had in herself, she now immolated herself. She turned the mass of her crimes to virtues, in order to serve God entirely in penance.

— Pope Gregory I (homily XXXIII), Carroll 2006

In Pope Gregory's interpretation, the seven demons expelled from Mary Magdalene by Jesus are transformed into the seven deadly sins of medieval Catholicism, leading Mary "to be condemned not only for lust, but for pride and covetousness as well". The aspect of the repentant sinner became almost equally significant as the disciple in her persona as depicted in Western art and religious literature, fitting well with the great importance of penitence in medieval theology. In subsequent religious legend, Mary's story became conflated with that of Mary of Egypt, a repentant prostitute who then lived as a hermit. With that, Mary's image was, according to Susan Haskins, author of Mary Magdalene: Myth and Metaphor, "finally settled...for nearly fourteen hundred years", although in fact the most important late medieval popular accounts of her life describe her as a rich woman whose life of sexual freedom is for pleasure. This composite depiction of Mary Magdalene was carried into the Mass texts for her feast day: in the Tridentine Mass, the collect identifies her as Mary of Bethany by describing Lazarus as her brother, and the Gospel is the story of the penitent woman anointing Jesus's feet.

Eastern Orthodox churches believed Mary was a disciple, and believed that after the Resurrection she lived as a companion to Mary the mother of Jesus. The Benedictine Order always celebrated Mary of Bethany together with Martha and Lazarus of Bethany on July 29, while Mary Magdalene was celebrated on July 22. John Chrysostom in the East (Matthew, Homily 88), and Ambrose (De virginitate 3,14; 4,15) in the West, when speaking of Mary Magdalene after the resurrection of Jesus Christ, suggest she was a virgin. Starting in around the eighth century, Christian sources record mention of a church in Magdala purported to have been built on the site of Mary Magdalene's house, where Jesus exorcized her of the seven demons.

In an eastern tradition supported by the western bishop and historian Gregory of Tours (c. 538 – 594), Mary Magdalene is said to have retired to Ephesus in Asia Minor with Mary the mother of Jesus, where they both lived out the rest of their lives. Gregory states that Mary Magdalene was buried in the city of Ephesus. Modestus, the Greek Orthodox Patriarch of Jerusalem from 630 until 634, describes a tradition that Mary Magdalene had come to Ephesus to live with the apostle John following the death of Mary the mother of Jesus.

=== High Middle Ages ===
==== Fictional biographies ====
Starting in early High Middle Ages, writers in western Europe began developing elaborate fictional biographies of Mary Magdalene's life. Stories about noble saints were popular during this time period; accordingly, tales of Mary Magdalene's wealth and social status became exaggerated. In the tenth century, Odo of Cluny (c. 880 – 942) wrote a sermon in which he described Mary as an extraordinarily wealthy noblewoman of royal descent. Some manuscripts of the sermon record that Mary's parents were named Syrus and Eucharia and one manuscript goes into detail, portraying her family as having land holdings in Bethany, Jerusalem, and Magdala.

The theologian Honorius Augustodunensis (c. 1080 – c. 1151) wrote that Mary was a wealthy noblewoman who was married in "Magdalum", but that she committed adultery, so she fled to Jerusalem and became a "public sinner" (vulgaris meretrix). Honorius said that, out of love for Jesus, Mary repented and withdrew into a life of quiet isolation. Under the influence of stories about other female saints, such as Mary of Egypt and Pelagia, painters in Italy during the ninth and tenth centuries gradually began to develop the image of Mary Magdalene living alone in the desert as a penitent ascetic. This portrayal became popular and quickly spread to Germany and England. From the twelfth century, Abbot Hugh of Semur (died 1109), Peter Abelard (died 1142), and Geoffrey of Vendôme (died 1132) all referred to Mary Magdalene as the sinner who merited the title apostolorum apostola (Apostle to the Apostles), with the title becoming commonplace during the twelfth and thirteenth centuries.

==== Belief of burial in France ====
In western Europe, elaborate and conflicting legends began to develop, which said that Mary Magdalene had travelled to southern France and died there. Starting in around 1050, the monks of the Vézelay Abbey of la Madaleine in Burgundy said they discovered Mary Magdalene's actual skeleton. At first, the existence of the skeleton was asserted, but, in 1265, the monks publicly announced that they had discovered it and, in 1267, the bones were brought before the king of France, who venerated them. On December 9, 1279, an excavation ordered by Charles II, King of Naples at Saint-Maximin-la-Sainte-Baume, Provence, led to the discovery of another burial, said by them to be of Mary Magdalene. According to them, the shrine was found intact, with an explanatory inscription stating why the relics had been hidden. Charles II commissioned the building of a new gothic basilica on the site and, in return for providing accommodation for pilgrims, the town's residents were exempt from taxes. Saint-Maximin-la-Sainte-Baume gradually displaced Vézelay in popularity and acceptance.

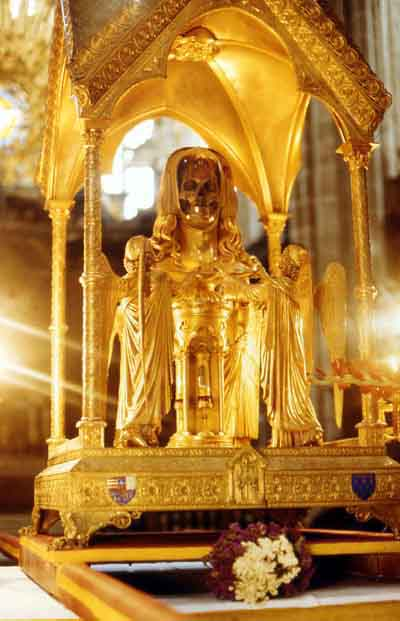
In 1279, the monks of Saint-Maximin-la-Sainte-Baume said they discovered Mary Magdalene's skeleton. The reliquary at St. Maximin, created in the nineteenth century, contains her purported skull.

==== The Golden Legend ====
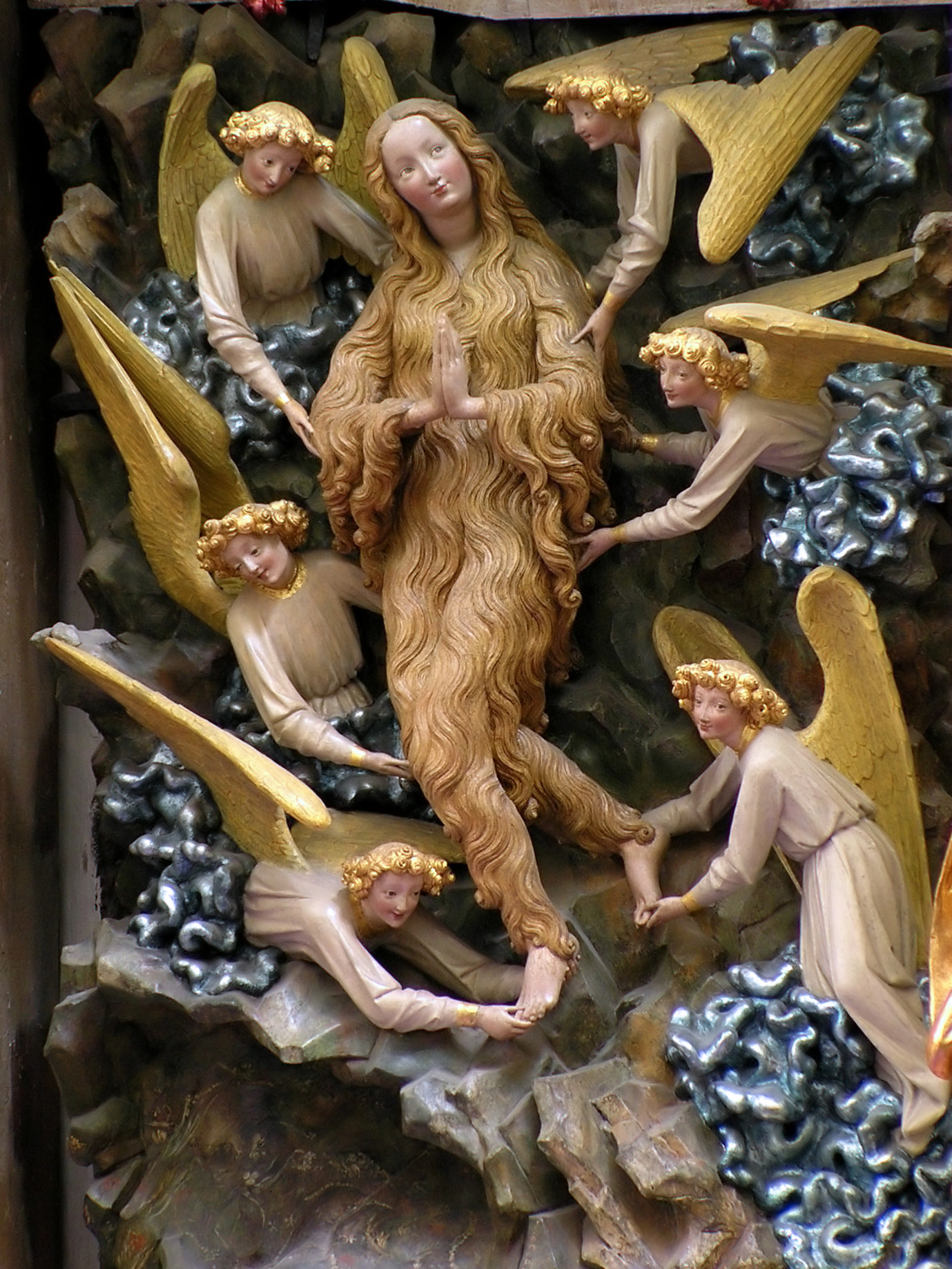
International Gothic Elevation of Mary Magdalene with angels raising her in SS. Johns' Cathedral in Toruń

The most famous account of Mary Magdalene's legendary life comes from The Golden Legend, a collection of medieval saints' stories compiled circa 1260 by the Italian writer and Dominican friar Jacobus de Voragine (c. 1230 – 1298). In this account, Mary Magdalene is, in Ehrman's words, "fabulously rich, insanely beautiful, and outrageously sensual", but she gives up her life of wealth and sin to become a devoted follower of Jesus. Fourteen years after Jesus's crucifixion, some pagans throw Mary, Martha, Lazarus who, in this account, is their brother due to a conflation with Mary of Bethany, and two other Christians named Maximin and Cedonius onto a rudderless boat in the Mediterranean to die. Miraculously, however, the boat washes ashore at Marseille in southern France. Mary persuades the governor of the city not to offer sacrifices to a pagan god and later persuades him to convert to Christianity after she proves the Christian God's power by successfully praying to Him to make the governor's wife pregnant. The governor and his wife sail for Rome to meet the apostle Peter in person, but their ship is struck by a storm, which causes the wife to go into labor. The wife dies in childbirth and the governor leaves her on an island with the still-living infant at her breast. The governor spends two years with Peter in Rome and, on his way home, he stops at the same island to discover that, due to Mary Magdalene's miraculous long-distance intercession, his child has survived for two years on his dead mother's breast milk. Then the governor's wife rises from the dead and tells him that Mary Magdalene has brought her back. The whole family returns to Marseille, where they meet Mary again in person. Mary herself spends the last thirty years of her life alone as a penitent ascetic in a cave in a desert in the French region of Provence. At every canonical hour, the angels come and lift her up to hear their songs in Heaven. On the last day of her life, Maximin, now the bishop of Aix, comes to her and gives her the Eucharist. Mary cries tears of joy and, after taking it, she lies down and dies. De Voragine gives the common account of the transfer of Mary Magdalene's relics from her sepulchre in the oratory of Saint Maximin at Aix-en-Provence to the newly founded Vézelay; the transportation of the relics is entered as undertaken in 771 by the founder of the abbey, identified as Gerard, Duke of Burgundy.

==== Spouse of John the Evangelist ====
The monk and historian Domenico Cavalca (c. 1270 – 1342), citing Jerome, suggested that Mary Magdalene was betrothed to John the Evangelist: "I like to think that the Magdalene was the spouse of John, not affirming it... I am glad and blythe that St Jerome should say so." They were sometimes thought to be the couple at the Wedding at Cana, though the Gospel accounts say nothing of the ceremony being abandoned. In the Golden Legend, De Voragine dismisses talk of John and Mary being betrothed and John leaving his bride at the altar to follow Jesus as nonsense.

=== Late Middle Ages and Renaissance ===
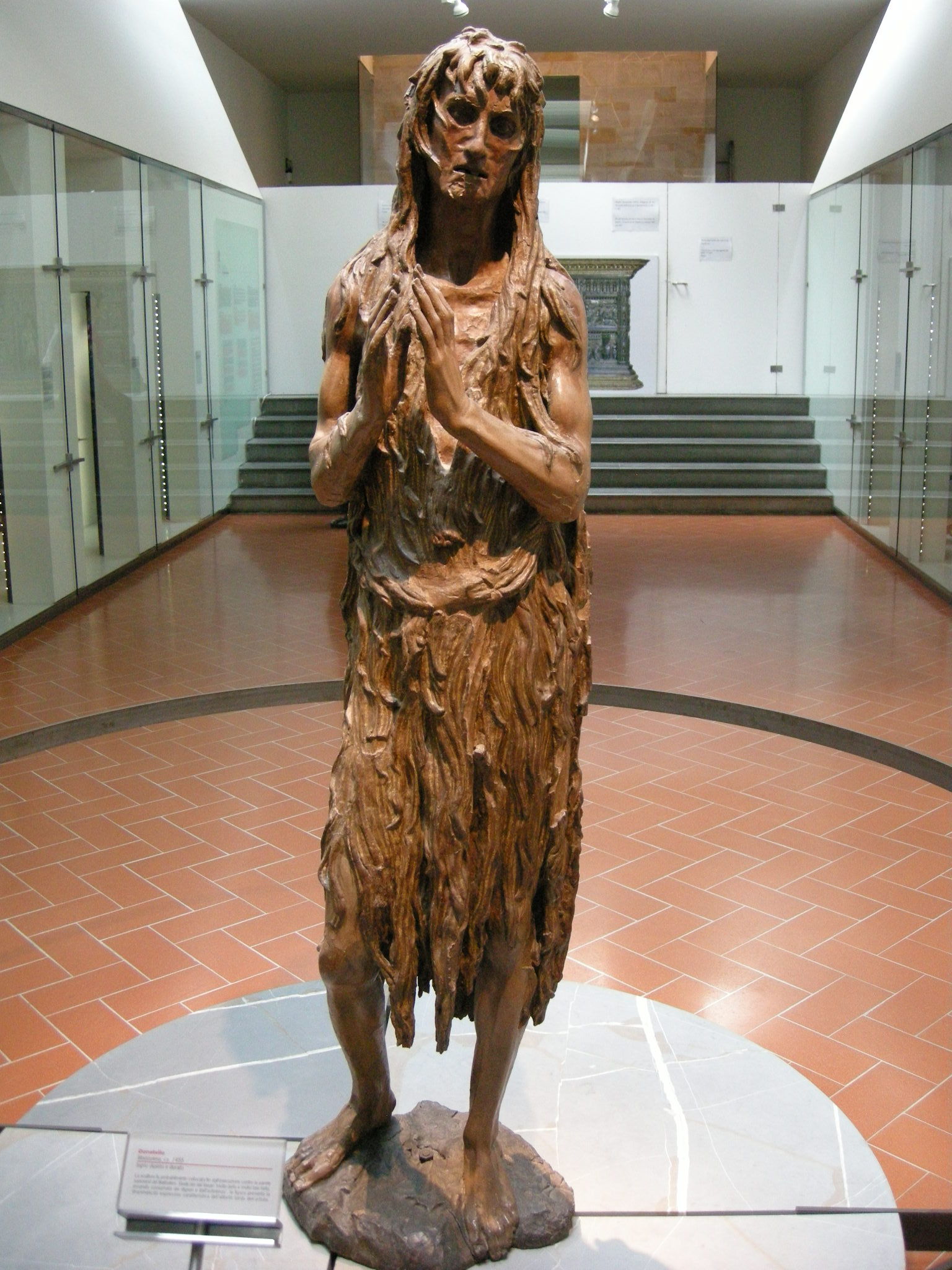
Penitent Magdalene (c. 1454) by Donatello, showing her as "an old, emaciated and toothless woman... worn down by years of hard solitude in her cave". The sculpture is an "extreme" example of Mary Magdalene's usual portrayal as a penitent ascetic.

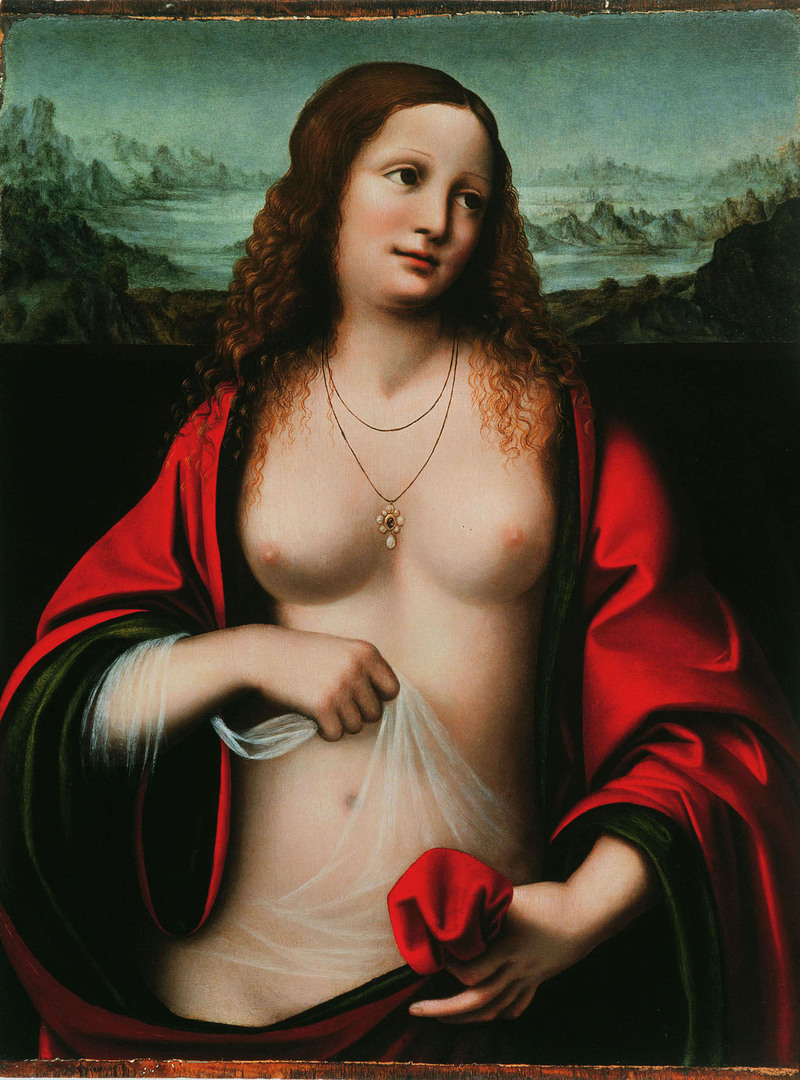
Mary Magdalene (c. 1515), traditionally attributed to Leonardo da Vinci's student Giampietrino. This painting shows a very different image of Mary Magdalene as "a woman who repents of nothing, who feels no shame or guilt".

The thirteenth-century Cistercian monk and chronicler Peter of Vaux de Cernay said it was part of Catharist belief that the earthly Jesus Christ had a relationship with Mary Magdalene, described as his concubine: "Further, in their secret meetings they said that the Christ who was born in the earthly and visible Bethlehem and crucified at Jerusalem was 'evil', and that Mary Magdalene was his concubine – and that she was the woman taken in adultery who is referred to in the Scriptures." A document, possibly written by Ermengaud of Béziers, undated and anonymous, attached to his Treatise against Heretics, makes a similar statement:

Also they [the Cathars] teach in their secret meetings that Mary Magdalene was the wife of Christ. She was the Samaritan woman to whom He said, "Call thy husband". She was the woman taken into adultery, whom Christ set free lest the Jews stone her, and she was with Him in three places, in the temple, at the well, and in the garden. After the Resurrection, He appeared first to her.

In the middle of the fourteenth century, a Dominican friar wrote a biography of Mary Magdalene in which he described her brutally mutilating herself after giving up prostitution, clawing at her legs until they bled, tearing out clumps of her hair, and beating her face with her fists and her breasts with stones. This portrayal of her inspired the sculptor Donatello (c. 1386 – 1466) to portray her as a gaunt and beaten ascetic in his wooden sculpture Penitent Magdalene (c. 1454) for the Florence Baptistery. In 1449, King René d'Anjou gave to Angers Cathedral the amphora from Cana in which Jesus changed water to wine, acquiring it from the nuns of Marseilles, who told him that Mary Magdalene had brought it with her from Judea, relating to the legend where she was the jilted bride at the wedding after which John the Evangelist received his calling from Jesus. (Note: Jansen 2001 citing Jacques Levron, Le bon roi René (Paris: Arthaud, 1972).)

=== Reformation and Counter-Reformation ===
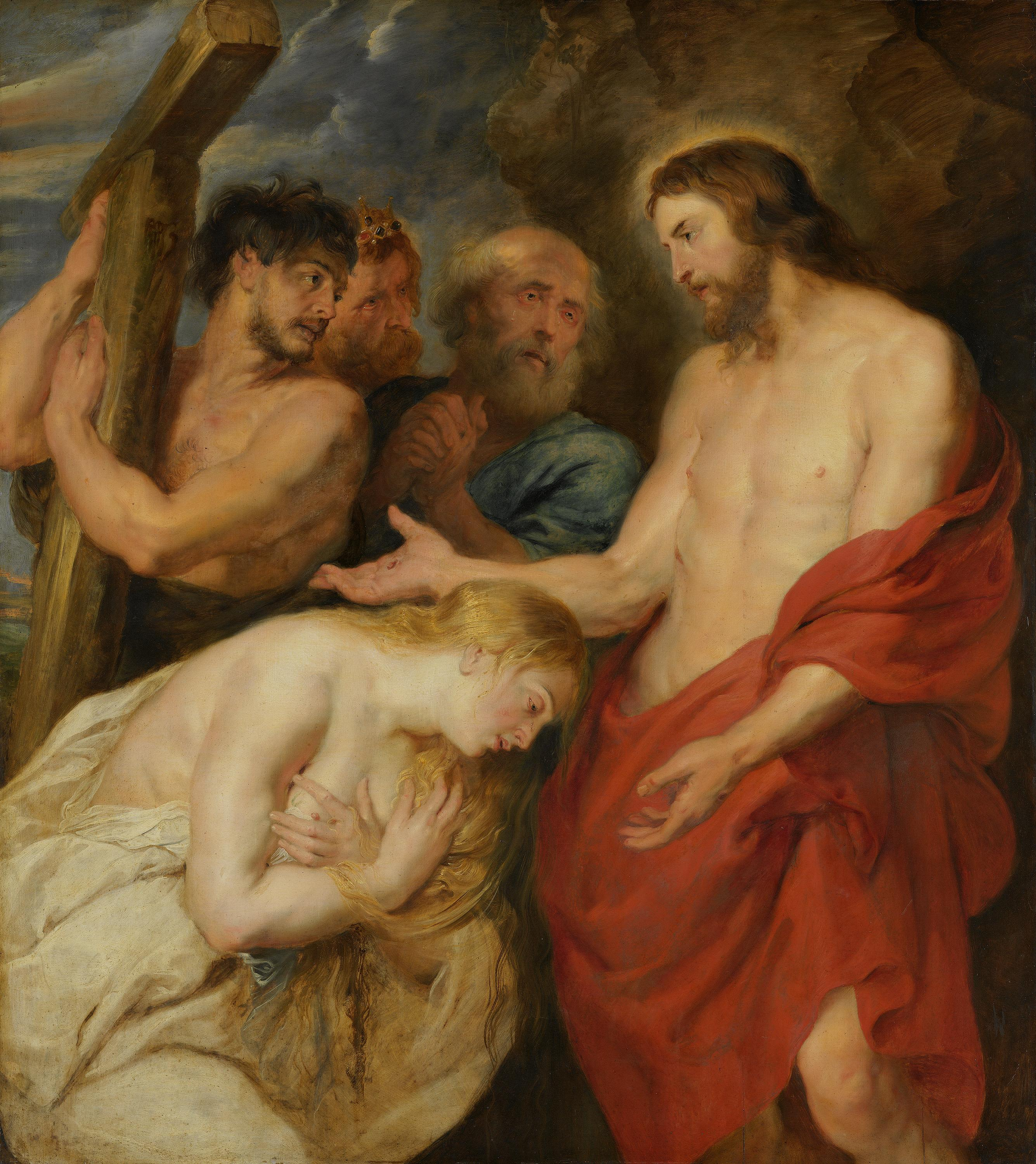
Christ and the Penitent Sinners (1617) by Peter Paul Rubens is a typical example of how Mary Magdalene was portrayed during the Baroque era, emphasizing her erotic allure and blurring the lines between religious and erotic art.

In 1517, on the brink of the Protestant Reformation, the leading French Renaissance humanist Jacques Lefèvre d'Étaples published his book De Maria Magdalena et triduo Christi disceptatio (Disputation on Mary Magdalene and the Three Days of Christ), in which he argued against the conflation of Mary Magdalene, Mary of Bethany, and the unnamed sinner in Luke. Various authors published a flurry of books and pamphlets in response, the vast majority of which opposed Lefèvre d'Étaples. In 1521, the theology faculty of the Sorbonne formally condemned the idea that the three women were separate people as heretical, and debate died down, overtaken by the larger issues raised by Martin Luther. Luther and Huldrych Zwingli (1484–1531) both supported the composite Magdalene. Luther, whose views on sexuality were much more liberal than those of his fellow reformers, reportedly once joked to a group of friends that "even pious Christ himself" had committed adultery three times: once with Mary Magdalene, once with the Samaritan woman at the well, and once with woman taken in adultery. Because the cult of Mary Magdalene was inextricably associated with the Catholic teaching of the intercession of saints, it came under particularly harsh criticism by Protestant leaders. Zwingli demanded for the cult of Mary Magdalene to be abolished and all images of her to be destroyed. John Calvin (1509–1564) not only rejected the composite Magdalene, but criticized Catholics as ignorant for having ever believed in it.

During the Counter-Reformation, Catholicism began to strongly emphasize Mary Magdalene's role as a penitent sinner. Her medieval role as a patron and advocate became minimized and her penitence became regarded as her most important aspect, especially in France and in the Catholic portions of southern Germany. A large number of Baroque paintings and sculptures depict the penitent Magdalene, often showing her nude or partially nude, with a strong emphasis on her erotic beauty. Poems about Mary Magdalene's repentance were also popular. Anton Giulio Brignole-Sale's Maria Maddalena peccatrice convertita (1636) is considered one of the masterpieces of the 17th-century religious novel, depicting the Magdalene's tormented journey to repentance convincingly and with psychological subtlety. Estates of nobles and royalty in southern Germany were equipped with small, modest hermitages called "Magdalene cells" that functioned as both chapels and dwellings, where the nobility could retreat to find religious solace. They were usually located in wild areas away from the rest of the property and their exteriors were designed to suggest vulnerability.

=== Modern era ===
Not she with trait'rous kiss her Saviour stung,
Not she denied Him with unholy tongue;
She, while apostles shrank, could danger brave,
Last at His cross, and earliest at His grave.

— Eaton Stannard Barrett, Woman (1810), Part I, lines 141–145

Because of the legends saying that Mary Magdalene had been a prostitute, she became the patroness of "wayward women", and, in the eighteenth century, moral reformers established Magdalene asylums to help save women from prostitution. Edgar Saltus's historical fiction novel Mary Magdalene: A Chronicle (1891) depicts her as a heroine living in a castle at Magdala, who moves to Rome becoming the "toast of the tetrarchy", telling John the Baptist she will "drink pearls... sup on peacock's tongues". Peter Julian Eymard, a Catholic priest and saint, called her "the patroness and model of a life spent in the adoration and service of Jesus in the sacrament of His Love".

The common identification of Mary Magdalene with other New Testament figures was omitted in the 1969 revision of the General Roman Calendar, with the comment regarding her liturgical celebration on July 22: "No change has been made in the title of today's memorial, but it concerns only Saint Mary Magdalene, to whom Christ appeared after his resurrection. It is not about the sister of Saint Martha, nor about the sinful woman whose sins the Lord forgave." Elsewhere it said of the Roman liturgy of July 22 that "it will make mention neither of Mary of Bethany nor of the sinful woman of Luke 7:36–50, but only of Mary Magdalene, the first person to whom Christ appeared after his resurrection". According to historian Michael Haag, these changes were an admission from the Vatican that the Church's previous teaching of Mary Magdalene as a repentant prostitute had been wrong. Mary of Bethany's feast day and that of her brother Lazarus is now on July 29, the memorial of their sister Martha.

The view of Mary as a repentant prostitute grew more prevalent in popular culture. She is portrayed as one in Martin Scorsese's 1988 film adaptation of The Last Temptation of Christ, in which Jesus, as he is dying on the cross, has a vision from Satan of what it would be like if he married Mary Magdalene and raised a family with her instead of dying for humanity's sins. Mary is likewise portrayed as a reformed prostitute in Andrew Lloyd Webber and Tim Rice's 1971 rock opera Jesus Christ Superstar. In Superstar, Mary describes her sexual attraction to Jesus in the song "I Don't Know How to Love Him", which shocked many of the play's original viewers. Ki Longfellow's novel The Secret Magdalene (2005) draws on the Gnostic gospels and other sources to portray Mary as a brilliant and dynamic woman who studies at the fabled library of Alexandria, and shares her knowledge with Jesus. Lady Gaga's song "Judas" (2011) is sung from Mary's perspective, portraying her as a prostitute who is "beyond repentance".

The 2018 film Mary Magdalene, starring Rooney Mara as the eponymous character, sought to reverse the portrayal of Mary Magdalene as a repentant prostitute, while also arguing against statements of her being Jesus's wife or sexual partner. Instead, the film portrays her as Jesus's closest disciple and the only one who truly understands his teachings. This portrayal is partially based on the Gnostic Gospel of Mary Magdalene. The film, which has been described as having a "strongly feminist bent", was praised for its music score and cinematography, its faithfulness to the Biblical narrative, and its acting, but was criticized as slow-moving, overwritten, and too solemn to be believable. It was also criticized by many Christians, who were offended by the film's use of extracanonical source material.

=== In Western art ===
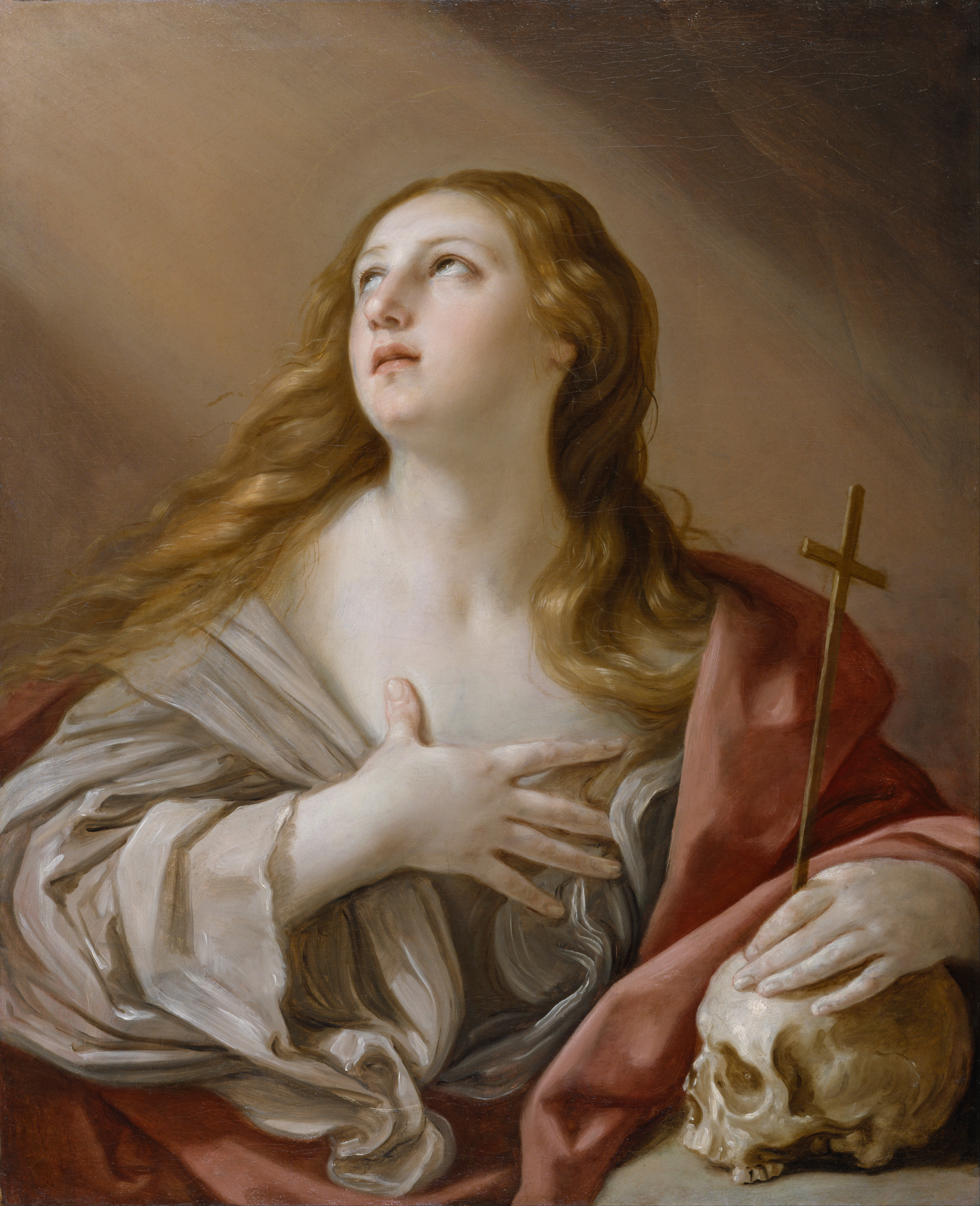
Penitent Magdalene (c. 1635) by Guido Reni, showing her as a penitent

The early belief of Mary Magdalene as a sinner and adulteress was reflected in Western medieval Christian art, where she was the most commonly depicted female figure after the Virgin Mary. She may be shown either as extravagantly and fashionably dressed, unlike other female figures wearing contemporary styles of clothes, or alternatively as completely naked but covered by very long blonde or reddish-blonde hair. The latter depictions represent the "Penitent Magdalene" motif, according to the medieval legend that she had spent a period of repentance as a desert hermit after leaving her life as a follower of Jesus. Her story became conflated in the West with that of Mary of Egypt, a fourth-century prostitute turned hermit, whose clothes wore out and fell off in the desert. The widespread artistic representations of Mary Magdalene in tears are the source of the modern English word maudlin, meaning "sickeningly sentimental or emotional".

In medieval depictions Mary's long hair entirely covers her body and preserves her modesty, supplemented in some German versions such as one by Tilman Riemenschneider by thick body hair, but, from the sixteenth century, some depictions, like those by Titian, show part of her naked body, the amount of nudity tending to increase in successive periods. When covered, she often wears a drape pulled around her, or an undergarment. In particular, Mary is often shown nude in the legendary scene of her "Elevation", where she is sustained in the desert by angels who raise her up and feed her heavenly manna, as recounted in the Golden Legend.

Mary Magdalene at the foot of the cross during the Crucifixion appears in an eleventh-century English manuscript "as an expressional device rather than a historical motif", intended as "the expression of an emotional assimilation of the event, that leads the spectator to identify himself with the mourners". Other isolated depictions occur, but, from the thirteenth century, additions to the Virgin Mary and John as the spectators at the Crucifixion become more common, with Mary Magdalene as the most frequently found, either kneeling at the foot of the cross clutching the shaft, sometimes kissing Christ's feet, or standing, usually at the left and behind Mary and John, with her arms stretched upwards towards Christ in a gesture of grief, as in a damaged painting by Cimabue in the Basilica of Saint Francis of Assisi of c. 1290. A kneeling Magdalene by Giotto in the Scrovegni Chapel, c. 1305 was especially influential. As Gothic painted crucifixions became complex compositions, the Magdalene became a prominent figure, with a halo and identifiable by her long blonde hair, and usually a bright red dress. As the swooning Virgin Mary became more common, generally occupying the attention of John, the unrestrained gestures of Magdalene increasingly represented the main display of the grief of the spectators.

According to Robert Kiely, "No figure in the Christian Pantheon except Jesus, the Virgin Mary, and John the Baptist has inspired, provoked, or confounded the imagination of painters more than the Magdalene." Apart from the Crucifixion, Mary was often shown in scenes of the Passion of Jesus, when mentioned in the Gospels, such as the Crucifixion, Christ Carrying the Cross and Noli me Tangere, but usually omitted in other scenes showing the Twelve Apostles, such as the Last Supper, in which she did not appear in the biblical accounts. As Mary of Bethany, she is shown as present at the Resurrection of Lazarus, her brother, and in the scene with Jesus and her sister Martha, which began to be depicted often in the seventeenth century, as in Christ in the House of Martha and Mary by Velázquez.

==== Gallery ====
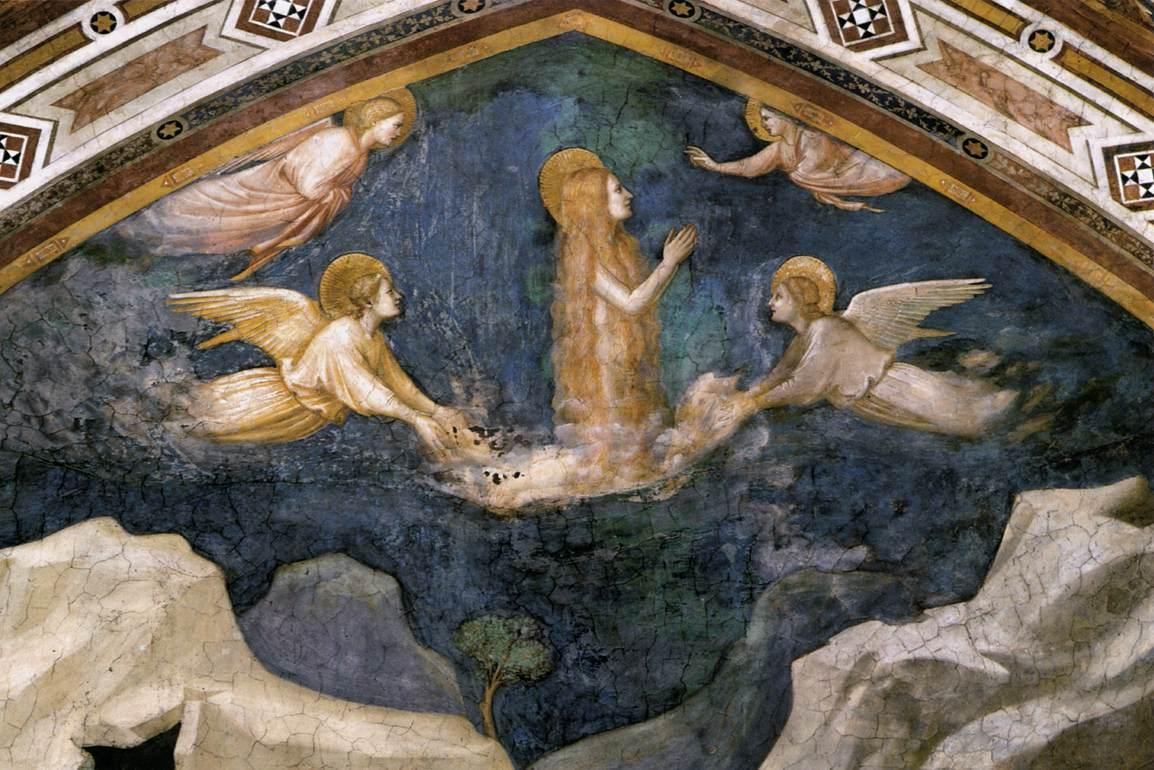
Giotto, Scenes from the Life of Mary Magdalene: Mary Magdalene Speaking to the Angels 1320s

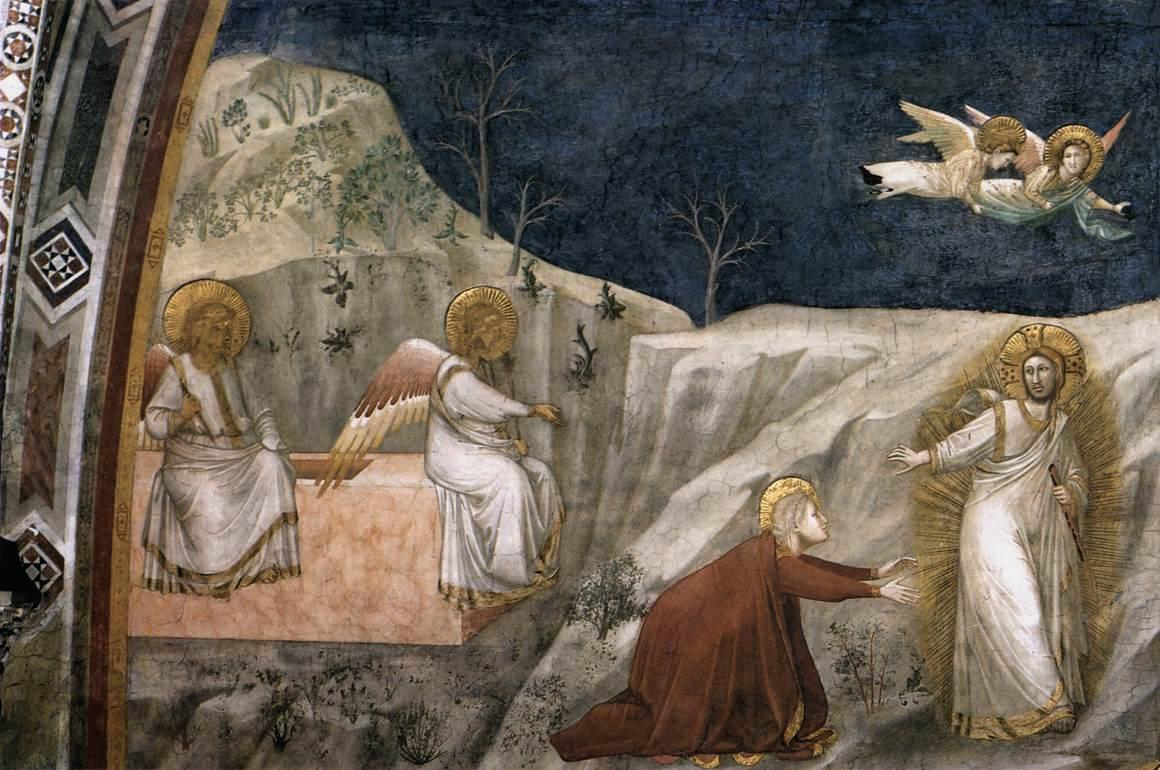
Giotto, Scenes from the Life of Mary Magdalene: Noli me tangere, 1320s

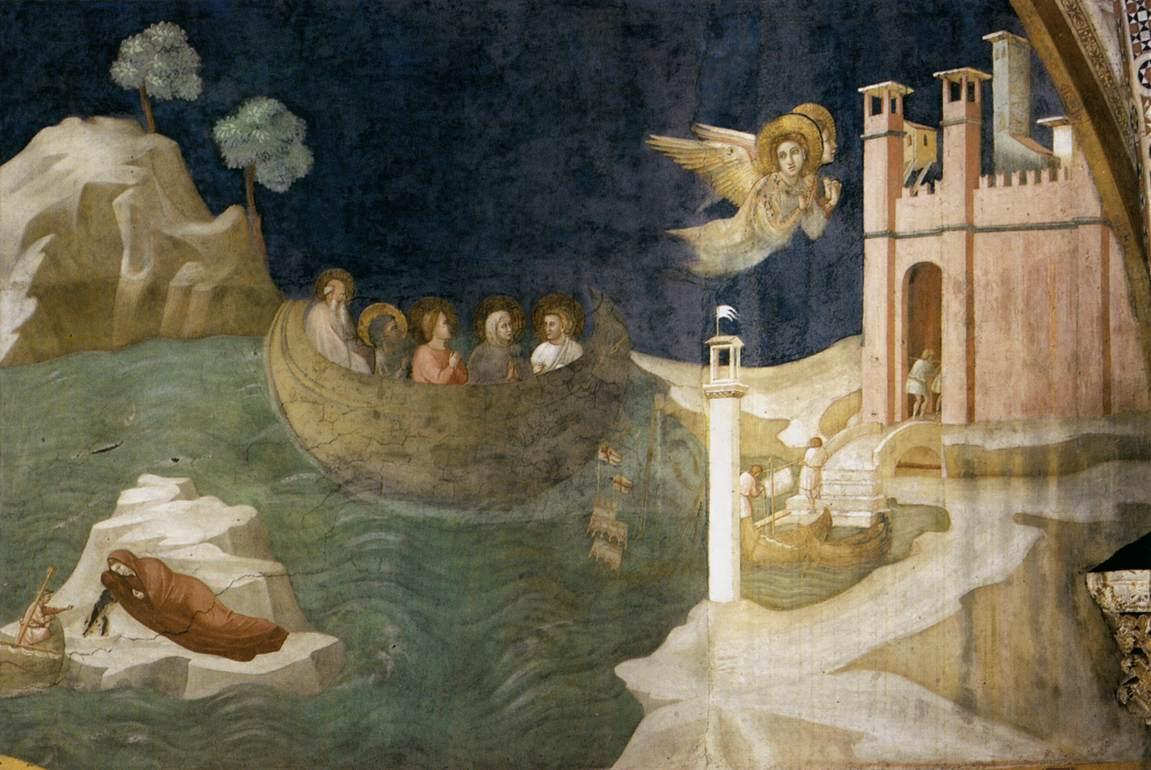
Giotto, Scenes from the Life of Mary Magdalene: Mary Magdalene's Voyage to Marseilles, 1320s

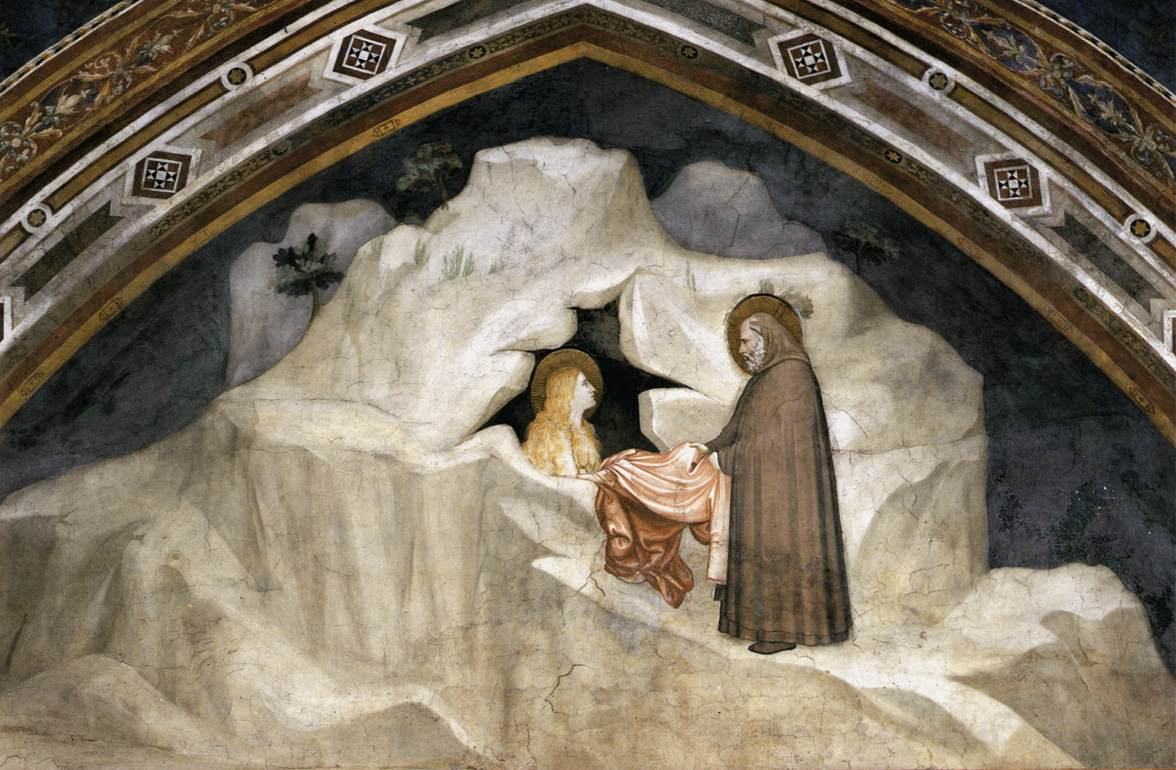
Giotto, Scenes from the Life of Mary Magdalene: The Hermit Zosimus Giving a Cloak to Magdalene, 1320s

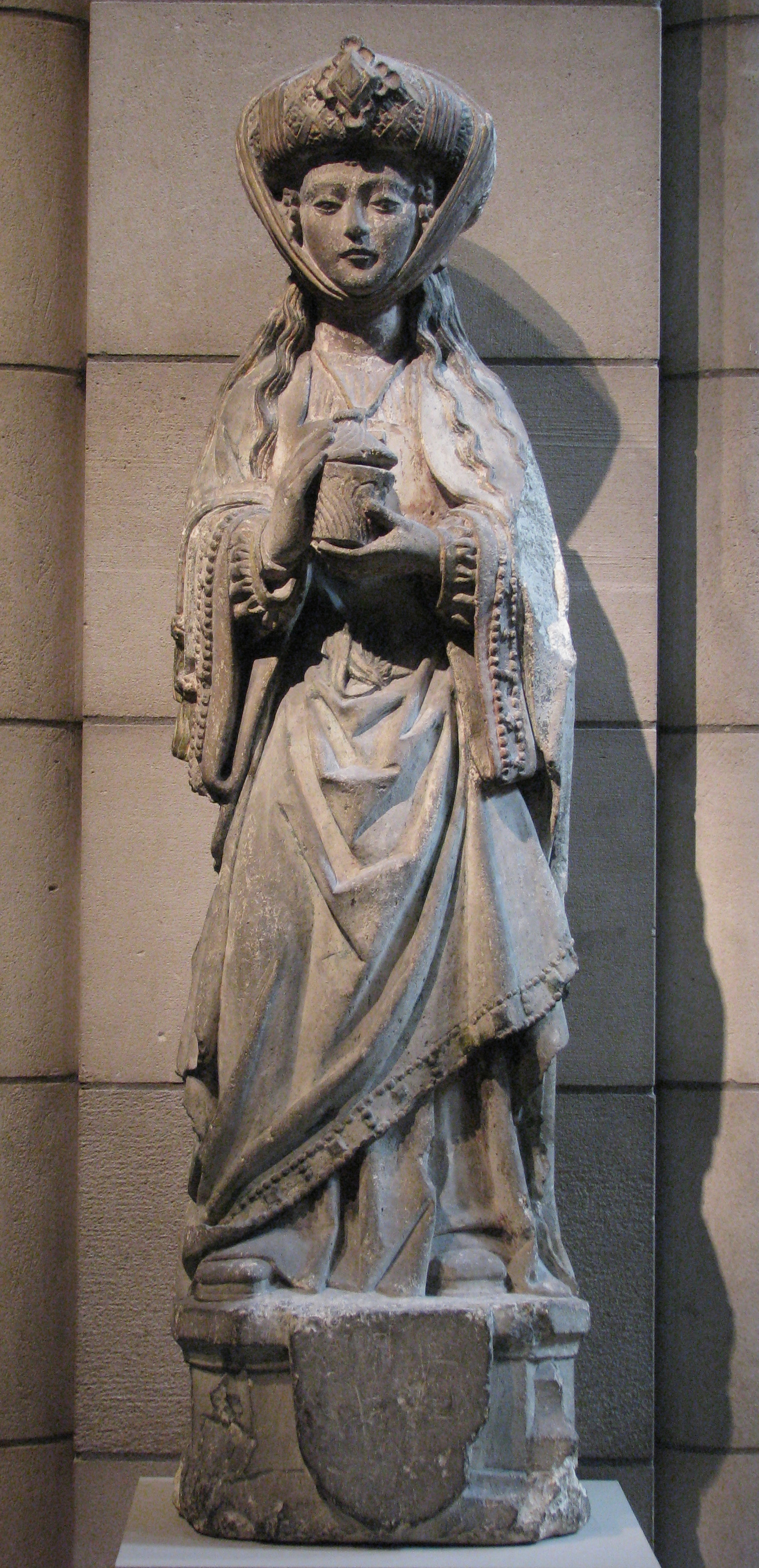
Saint Mary Magdalene, French (1500-25)

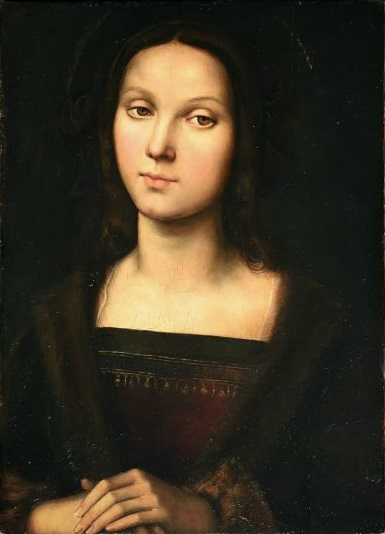
St. Mary Magdalene, attr. Raphael (1505)

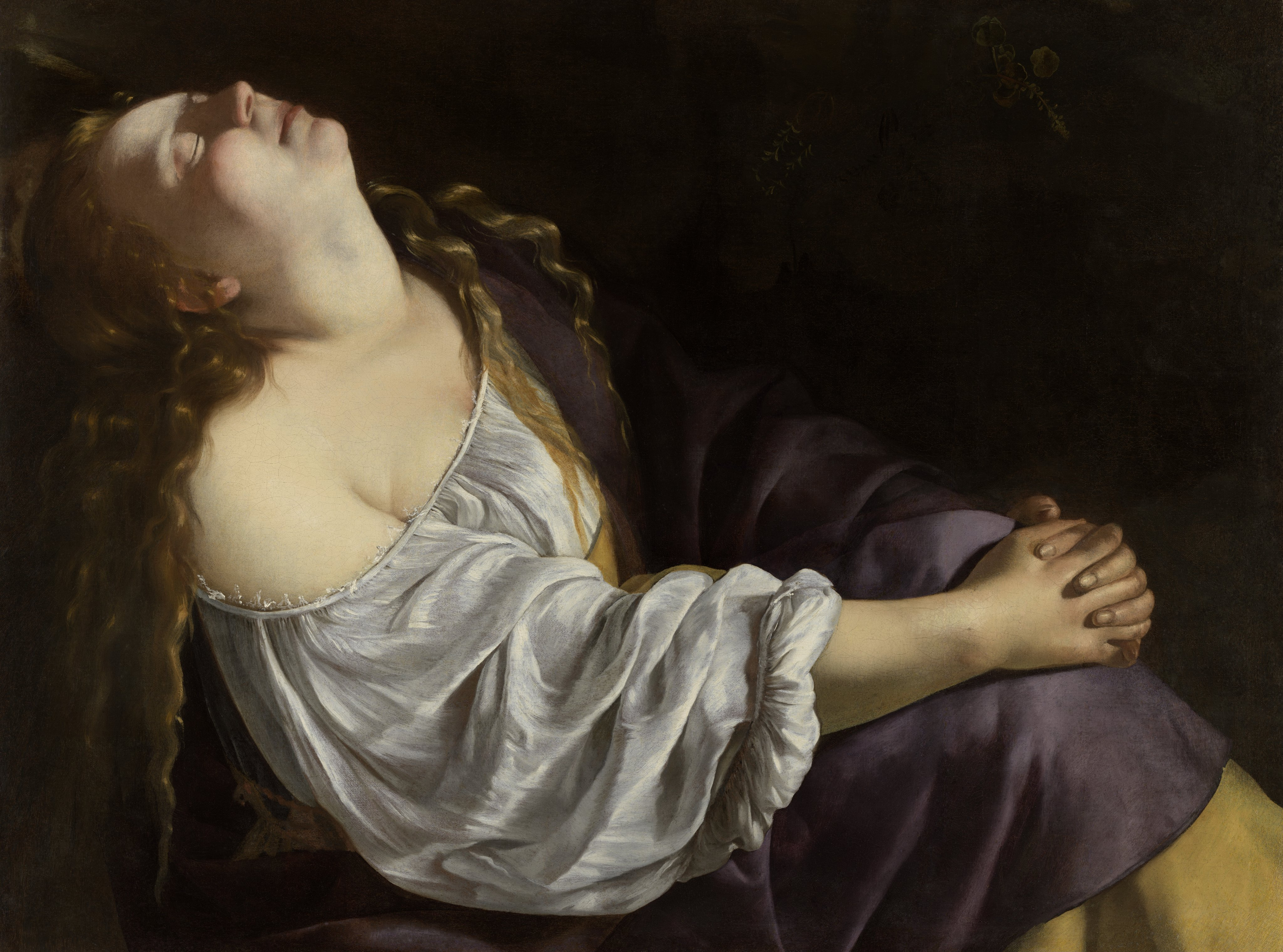
Artemisia Gentileschi, Mary Magdalene in Ecstasy (1625)

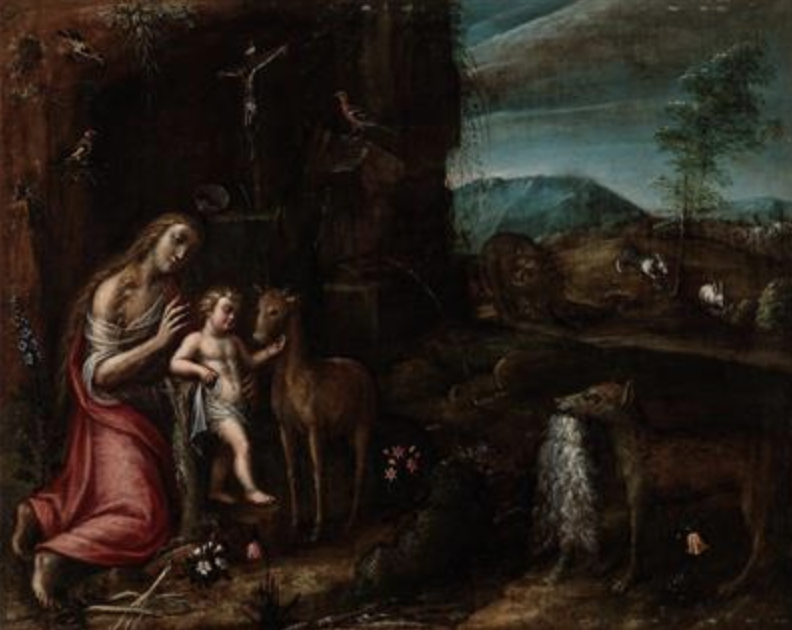
Orsola Maddalena Caccia, The Penitent Mary Magdalene (17th century)

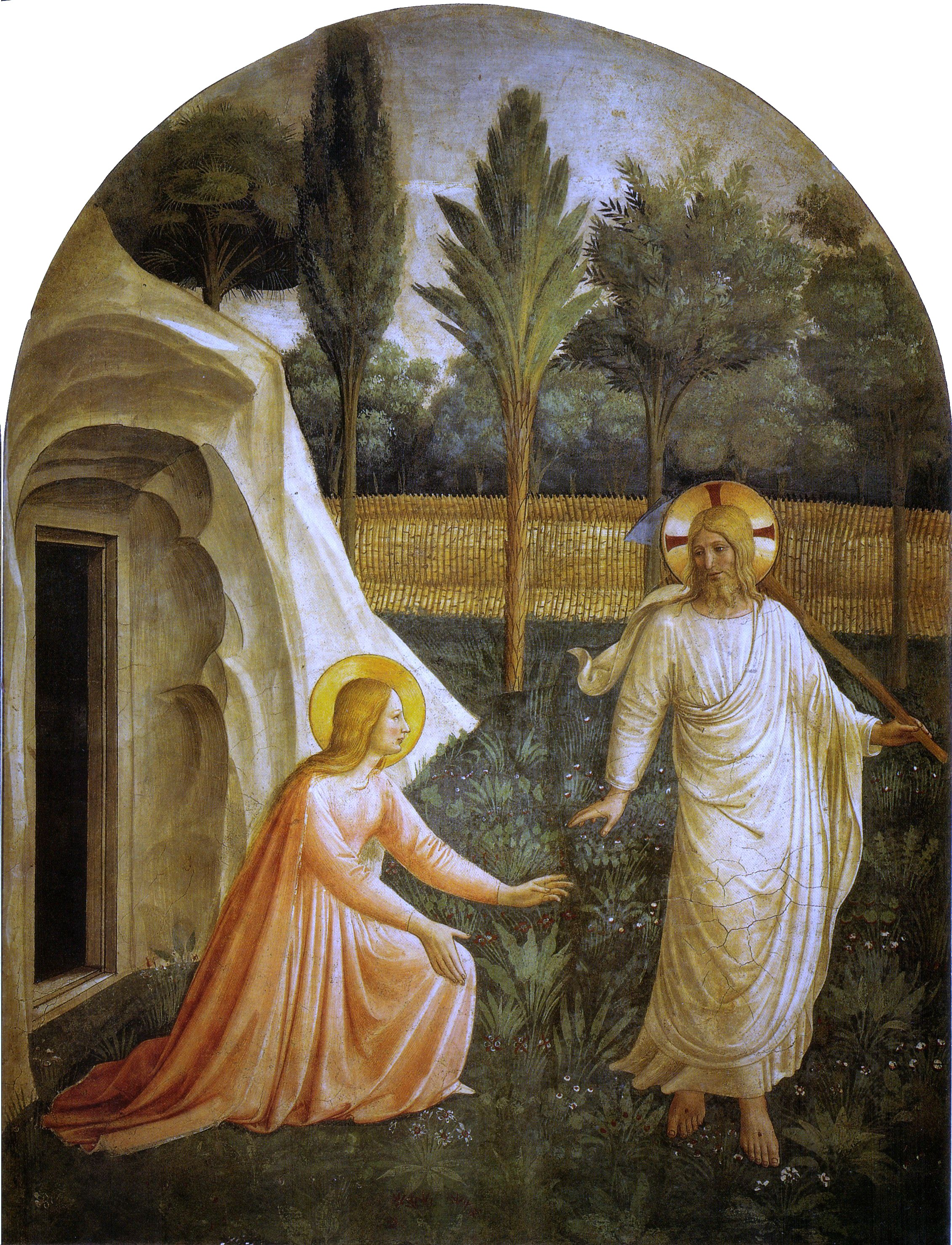
Noli me tangere (c. 1440 – 1442), fresco by Fra Angelico

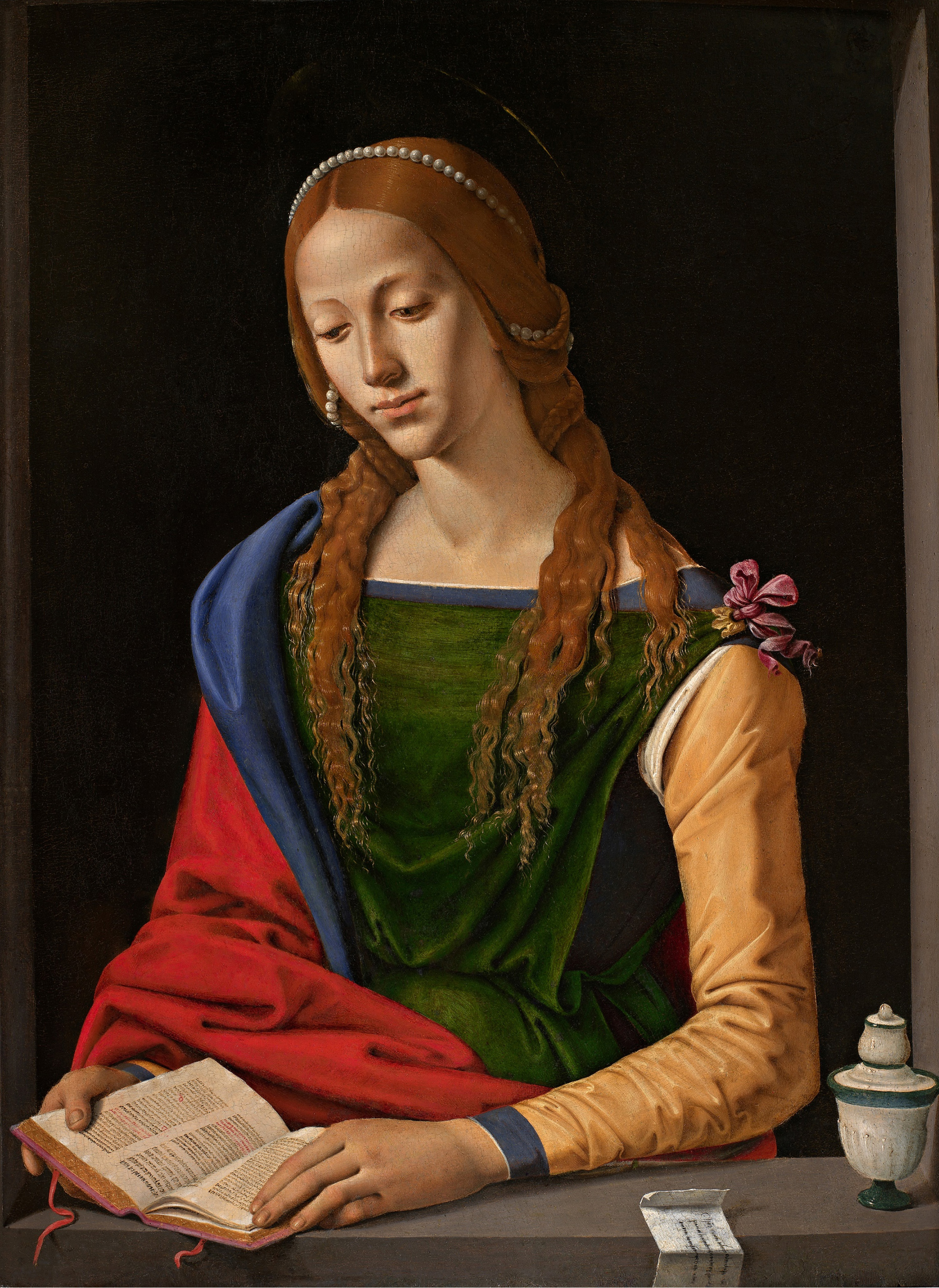
Mary Magdalene Reading (c. 1500 – 1510) by Piero di Cosimo

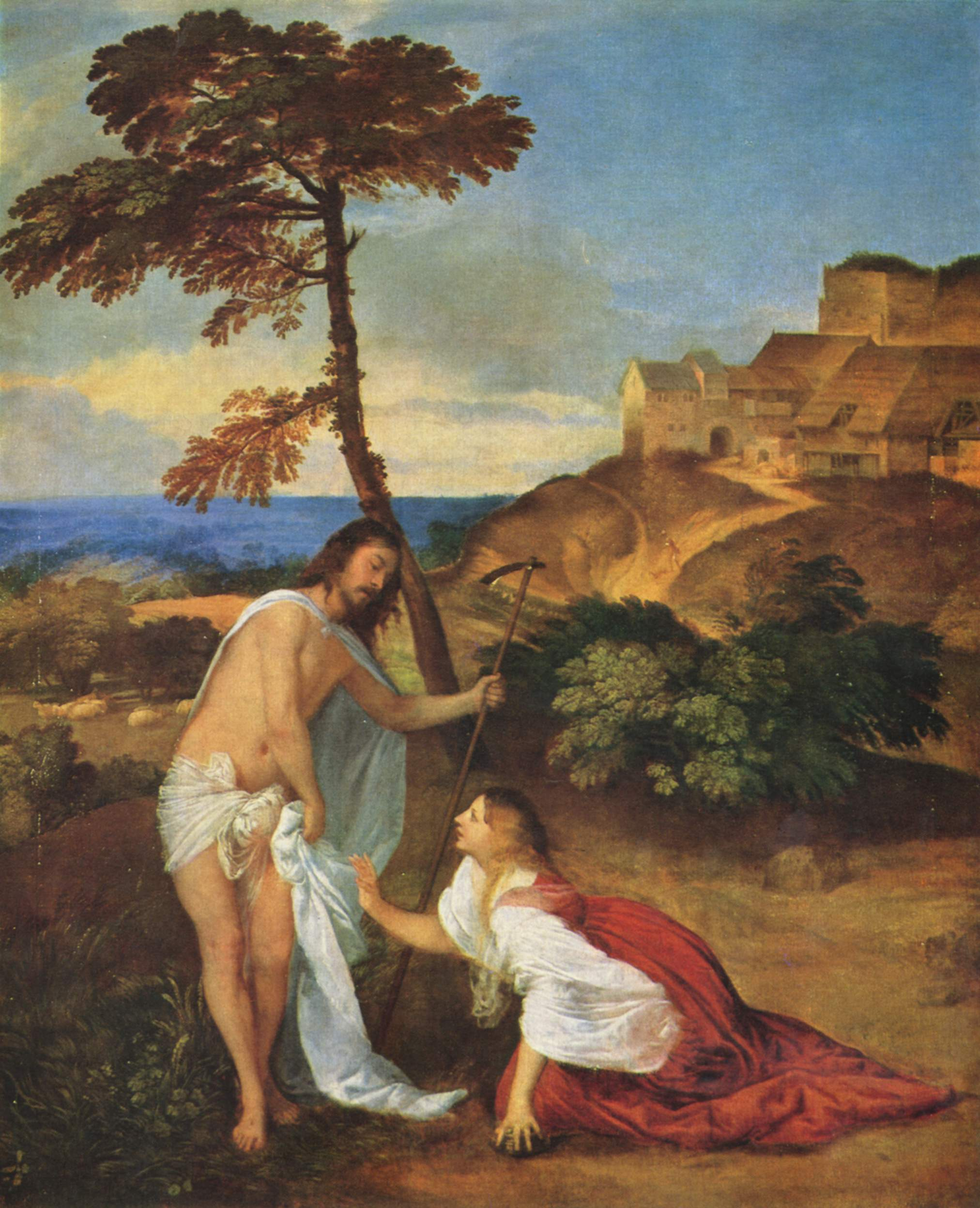
Noli me tangere (c. 1512) by Titian

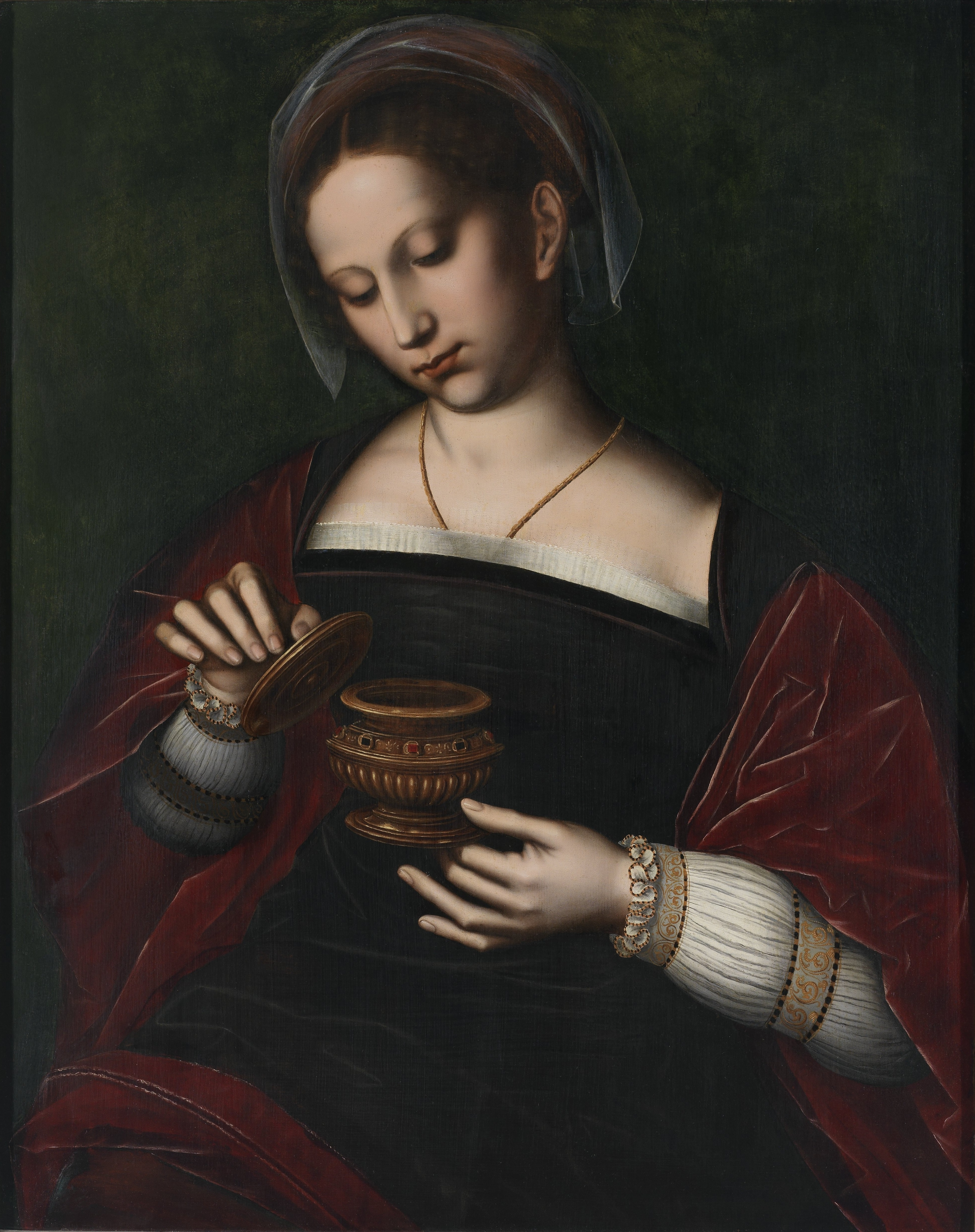
Mary Magdalene (early 1500s) by Ambrosius Benson

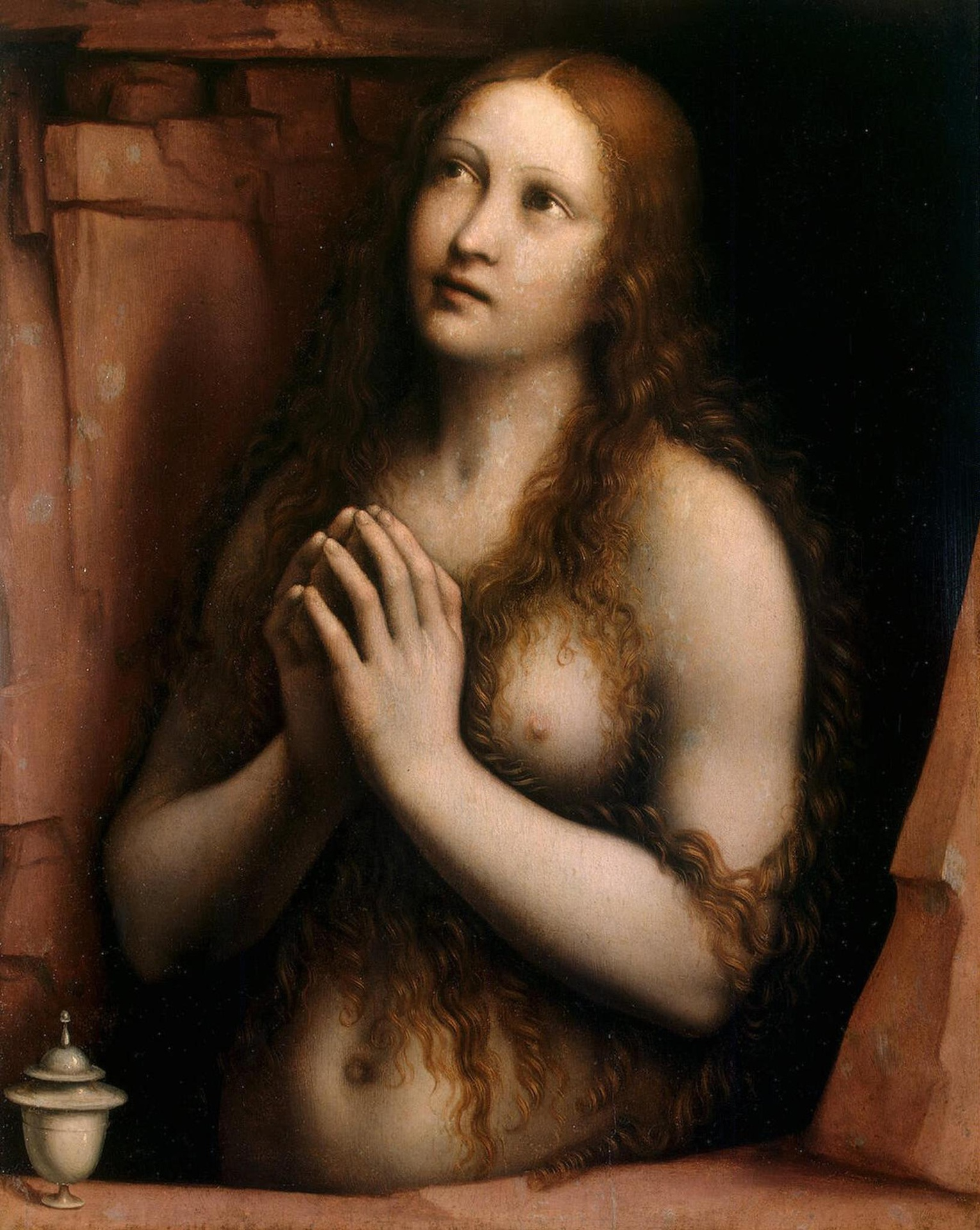
Magdalena Penitente (early 1500s) by Giampietrino

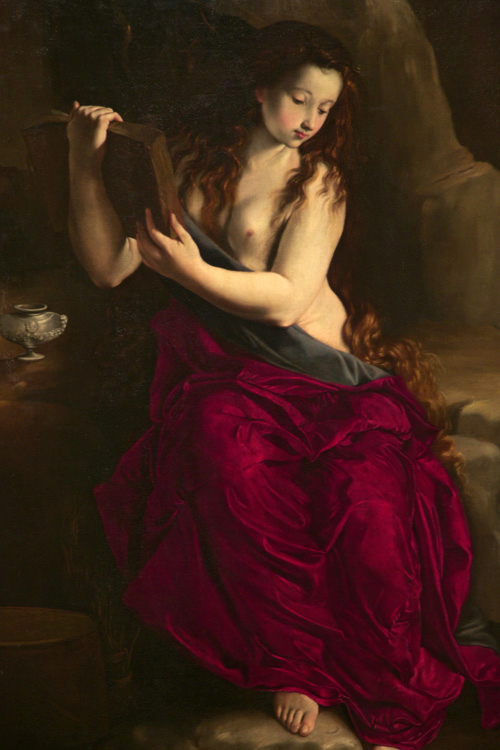
Mary Magdalene (1615) by Juan Bautista Maíno

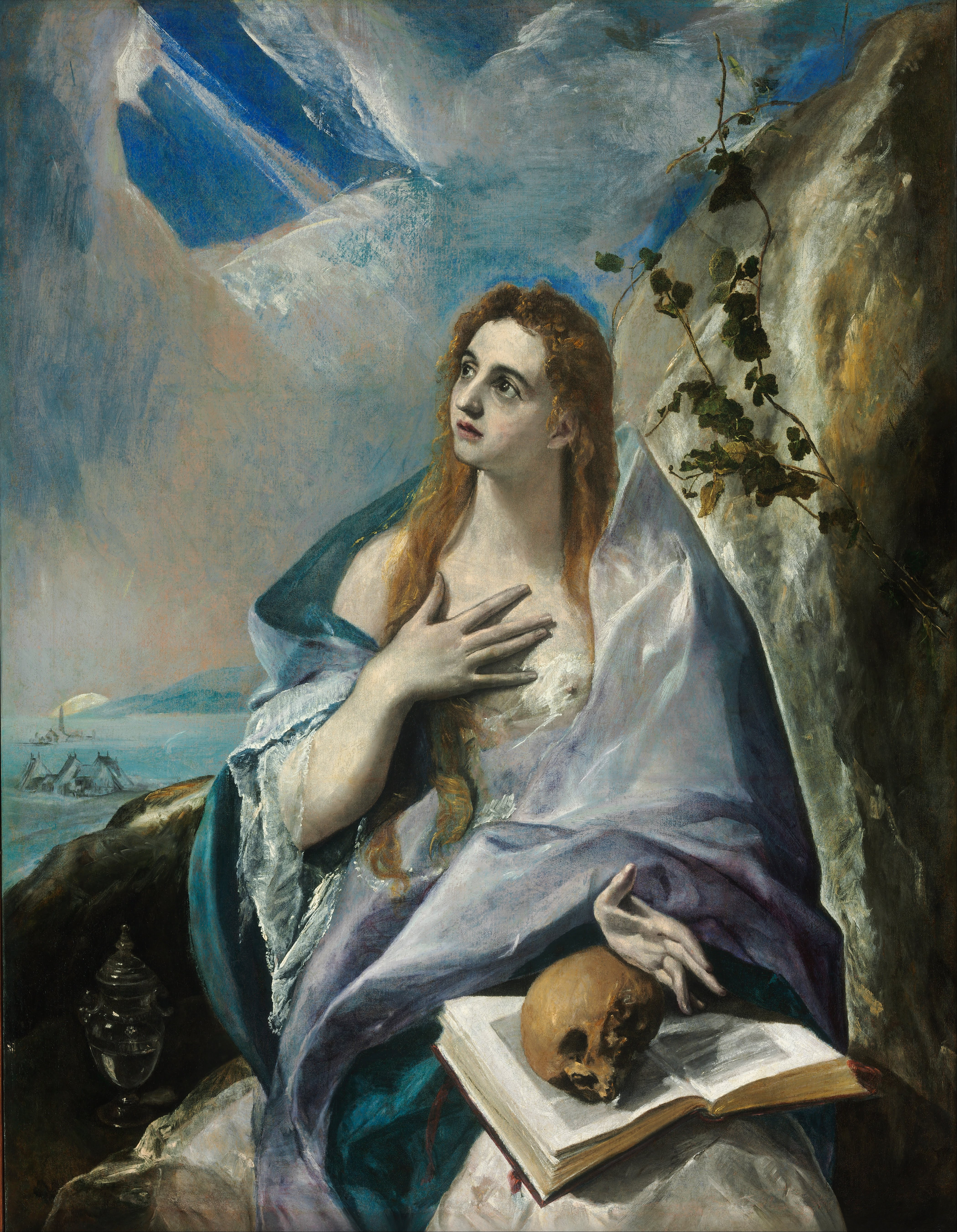
Penitent Magdalene (c. 1576 – 1578) by El Greco

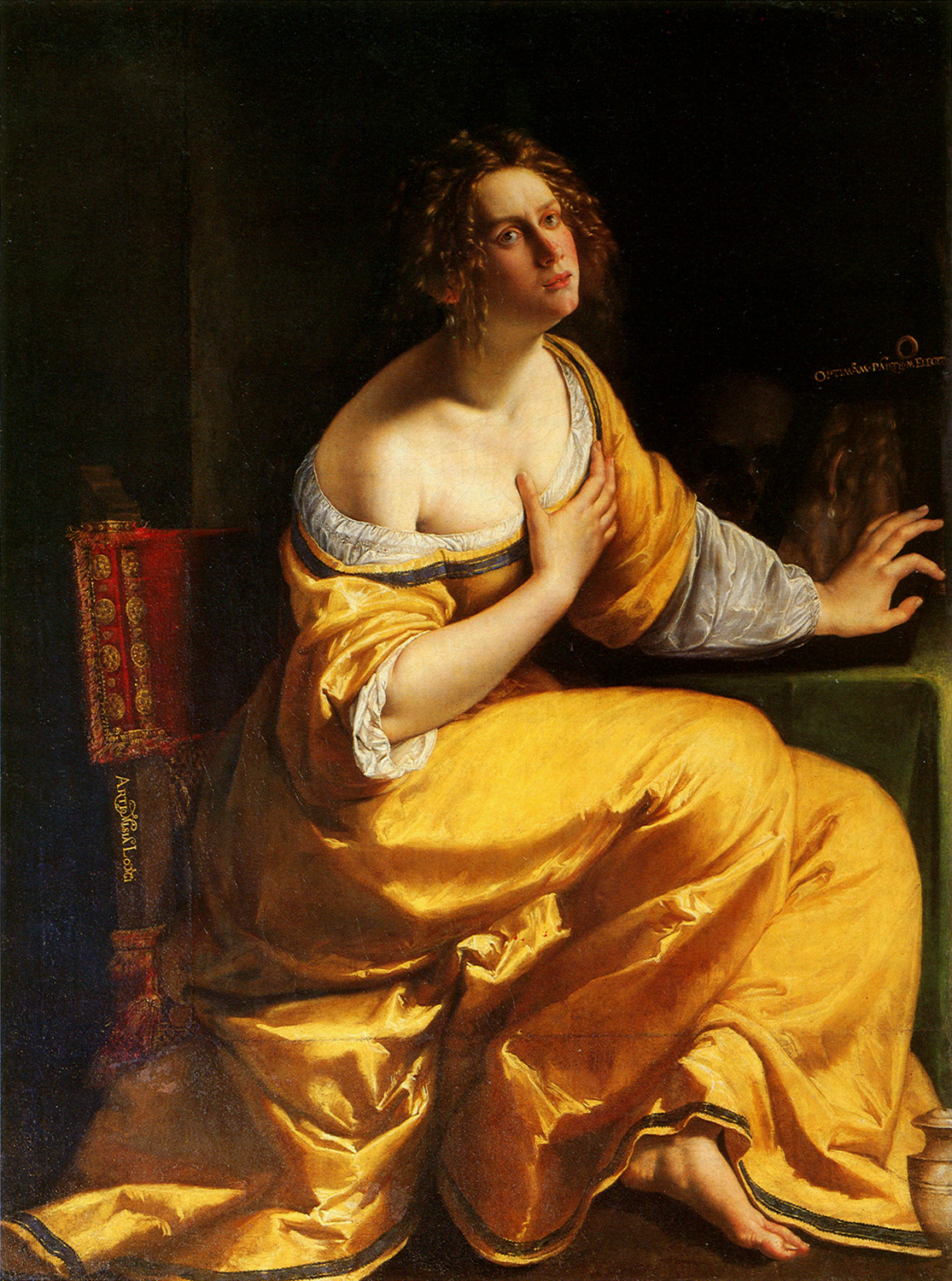
Mary Magdalene (1615–1616 or 1620–1625) by Artemisia Gentileschi

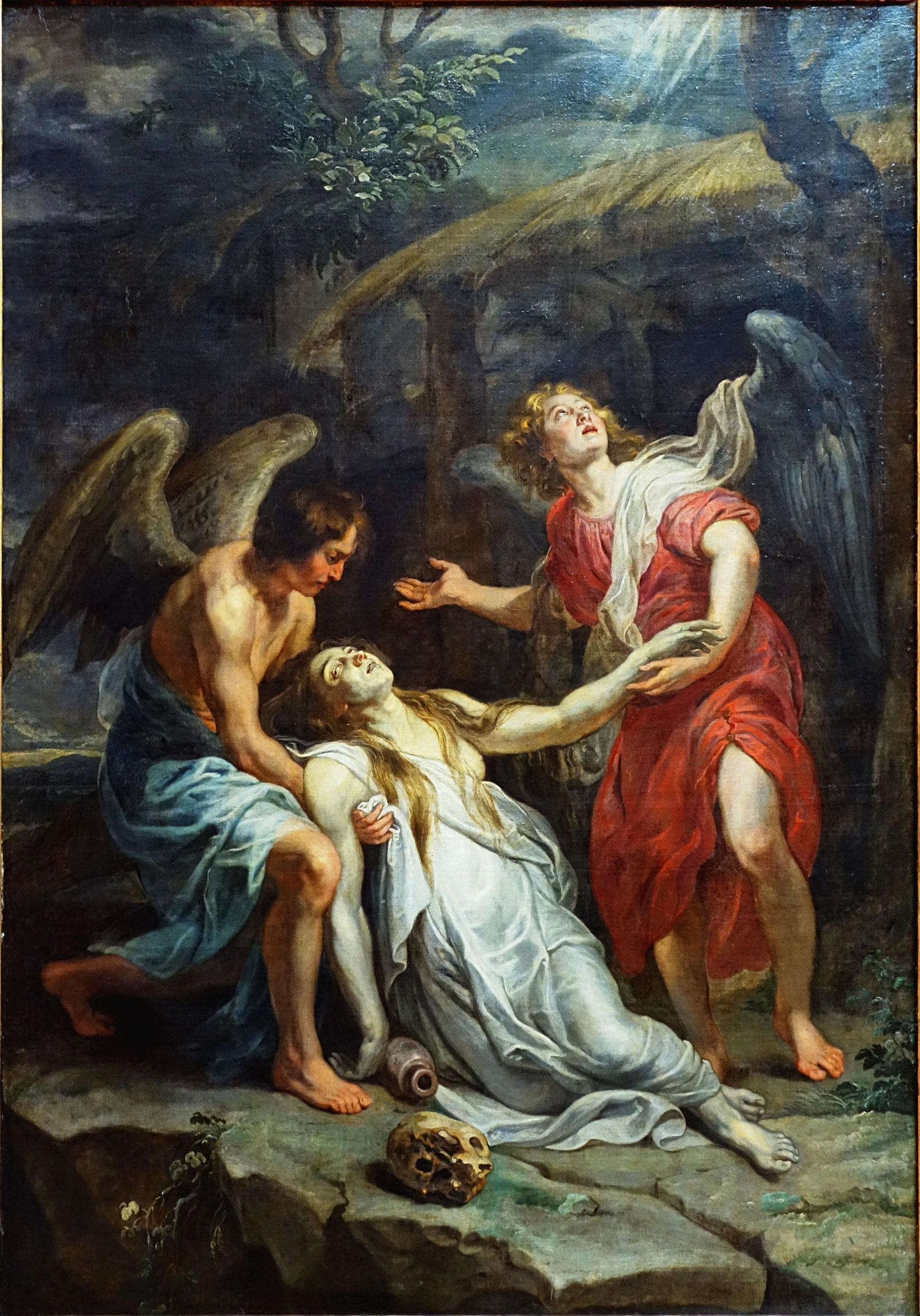
St Mary Magdalene in Ecstasy (c. 1619 – 1620) by Peter Paul Rubens

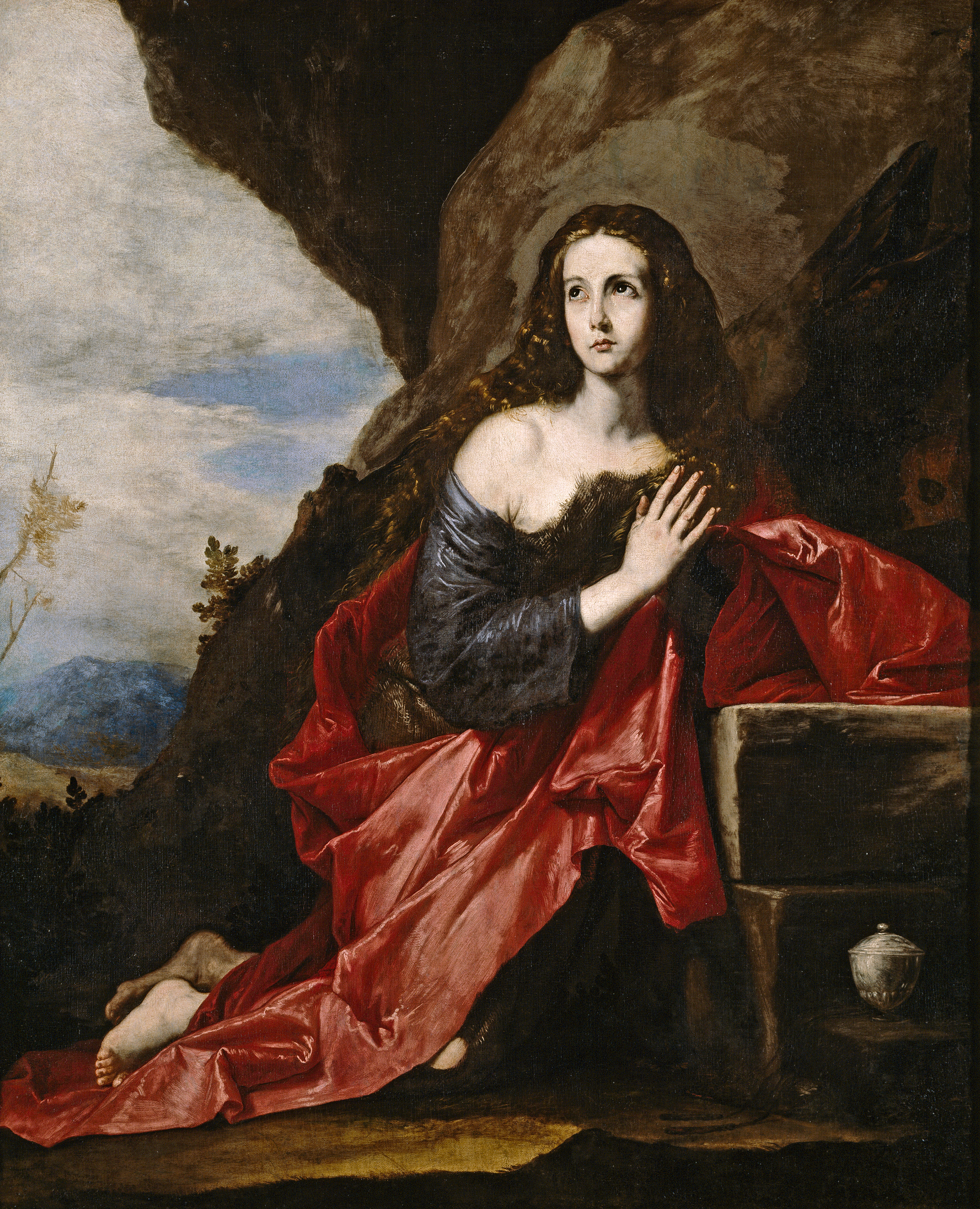
Mary Magdalene (1641) by José de Ribera

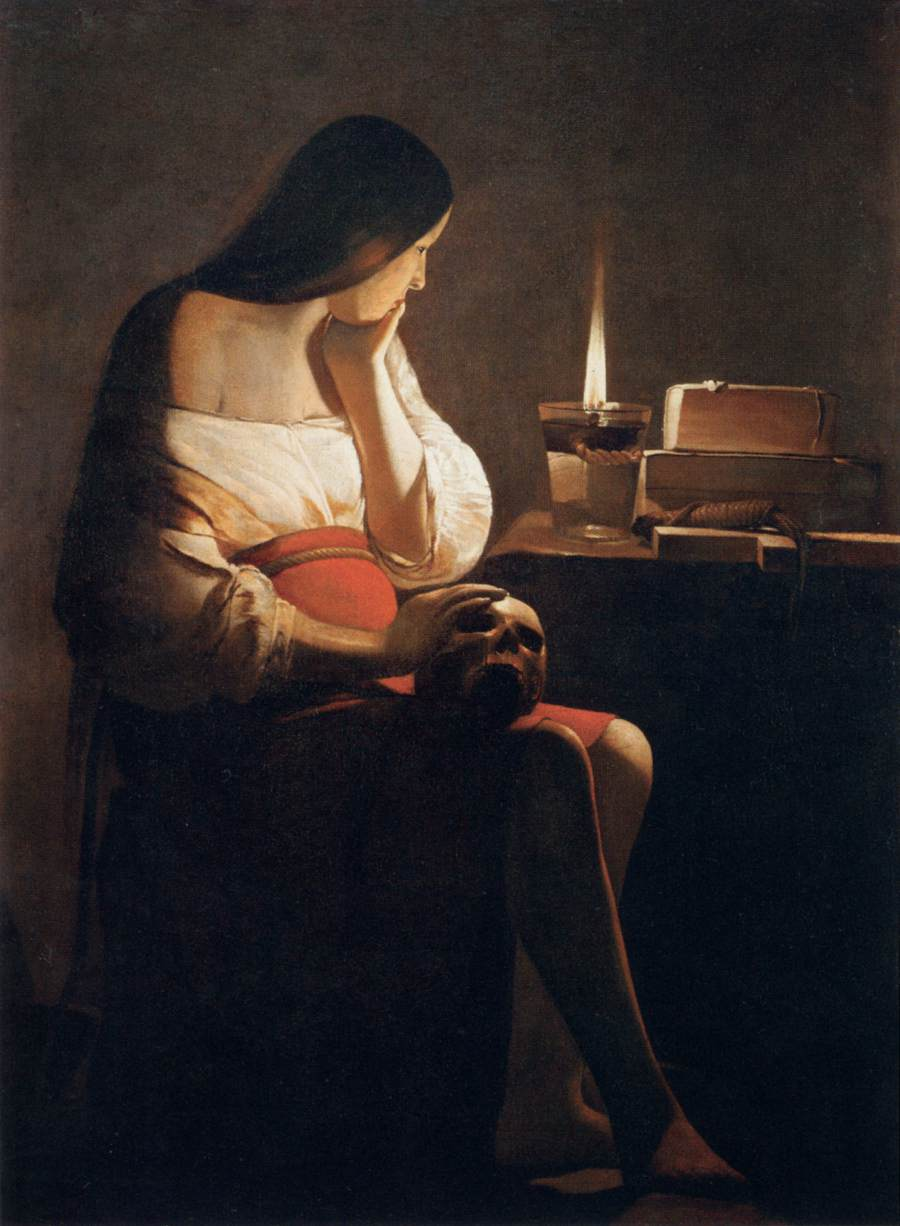
Magdalene with the Smoking Flame (c. 1640) by Georges de La Tour

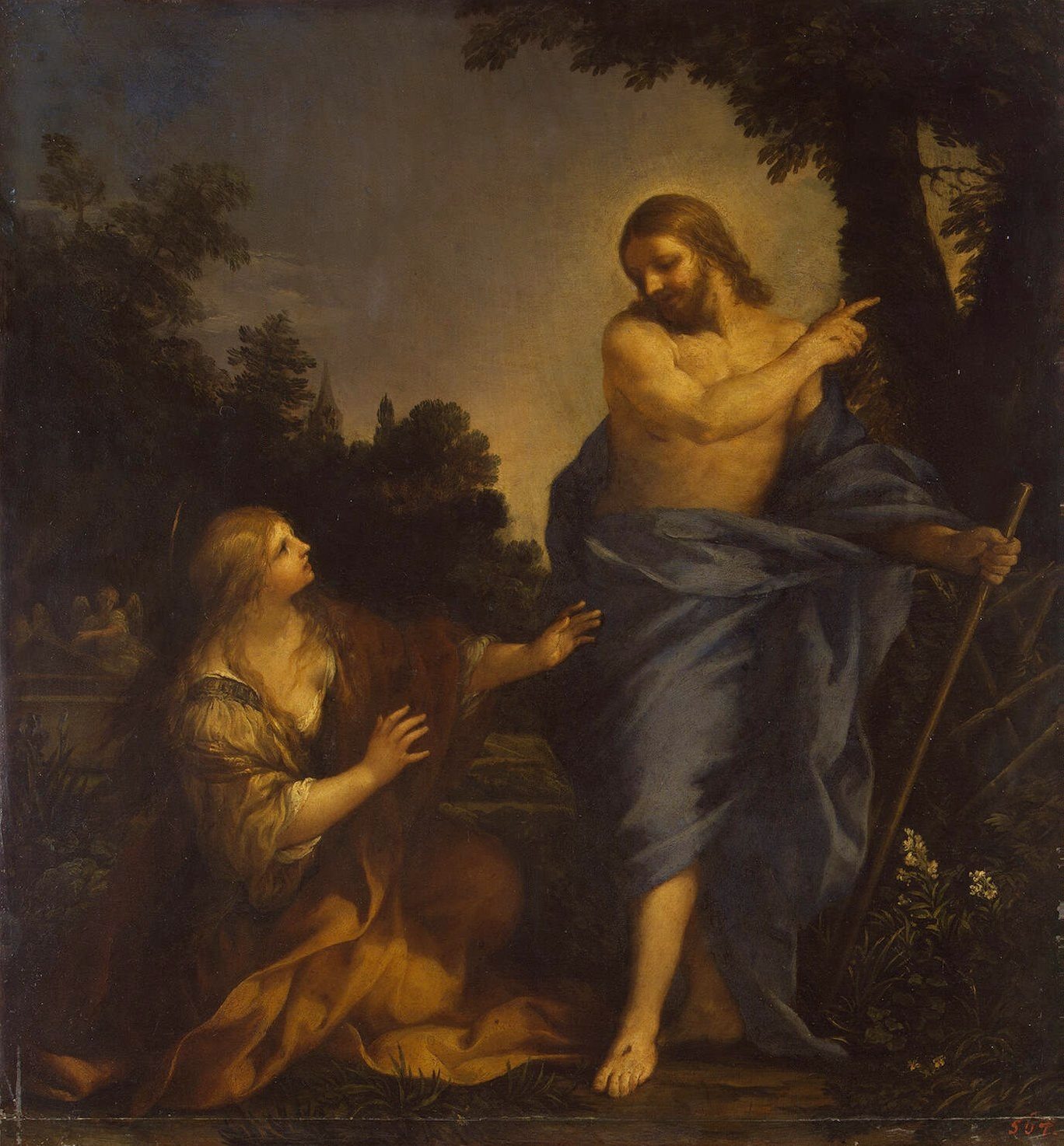
Christ Appearing to Mary Magdalene (between 1640 and 1650) by Pietro da Cortona

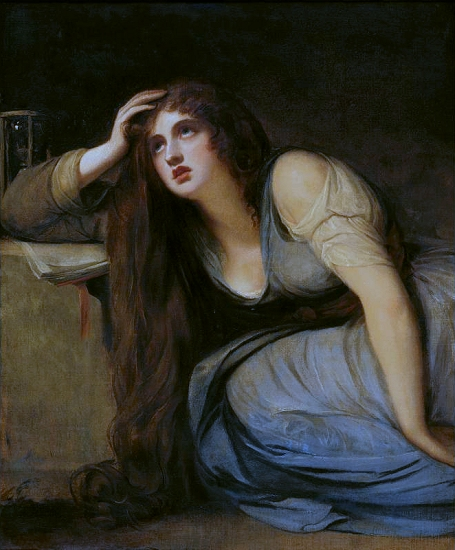
The Magdalene (before 1792) by George Romney

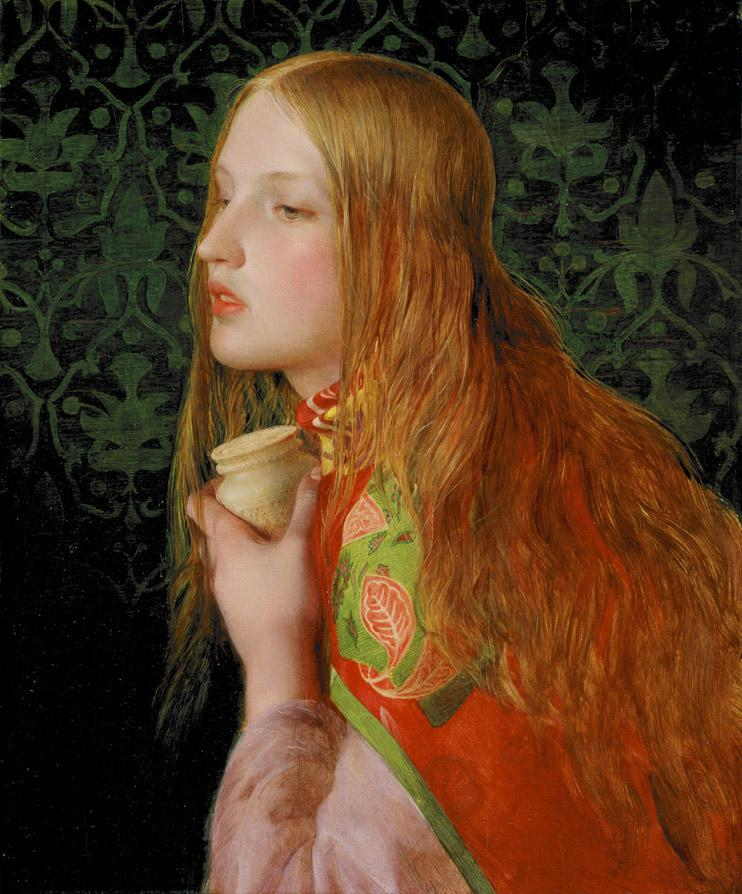
Mary Magdalene (1858–1860) by Frederick Sandys

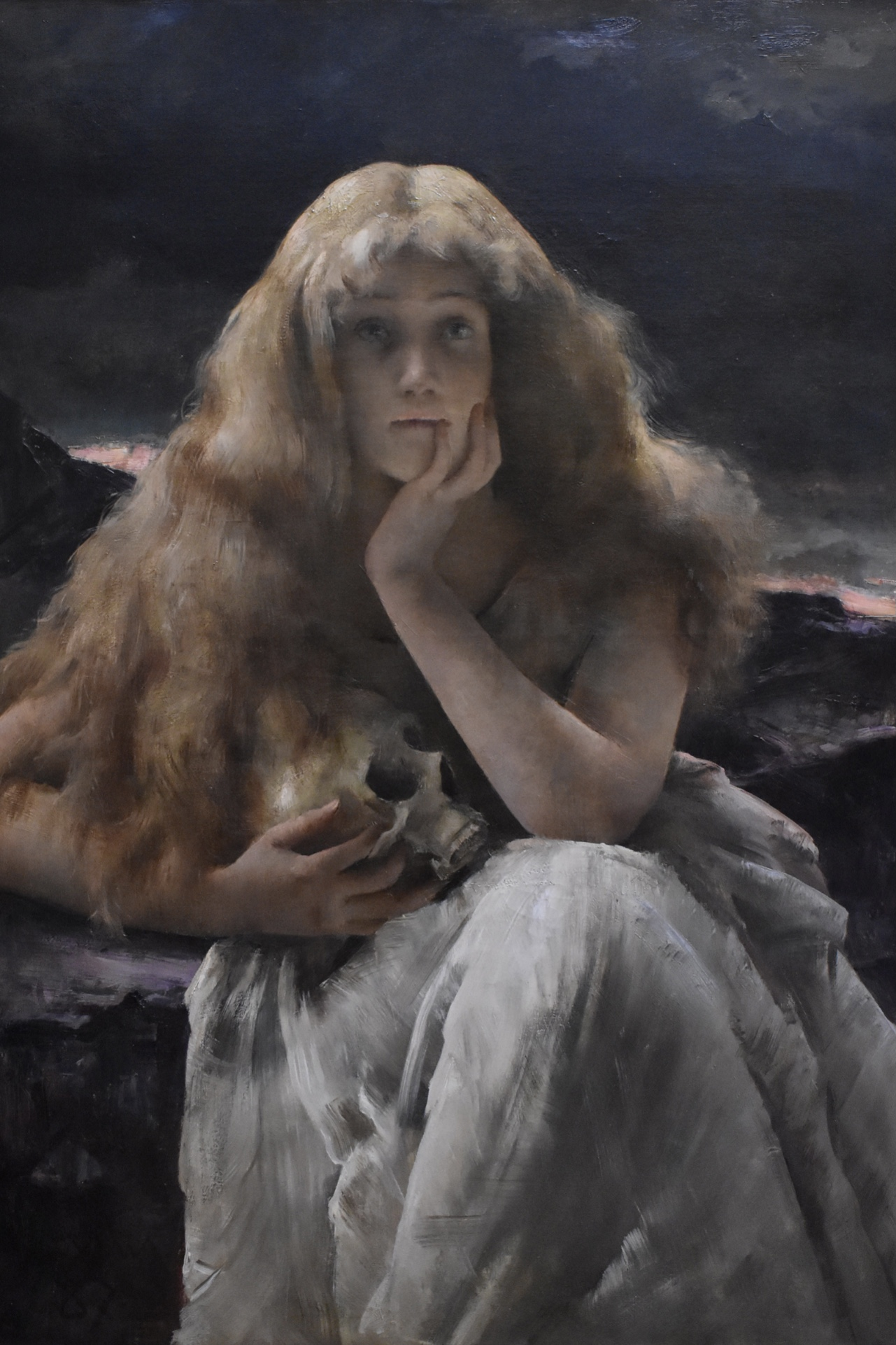
Sarah Bernhardt as Maria Magdalena (1887) by Alfred Stevens

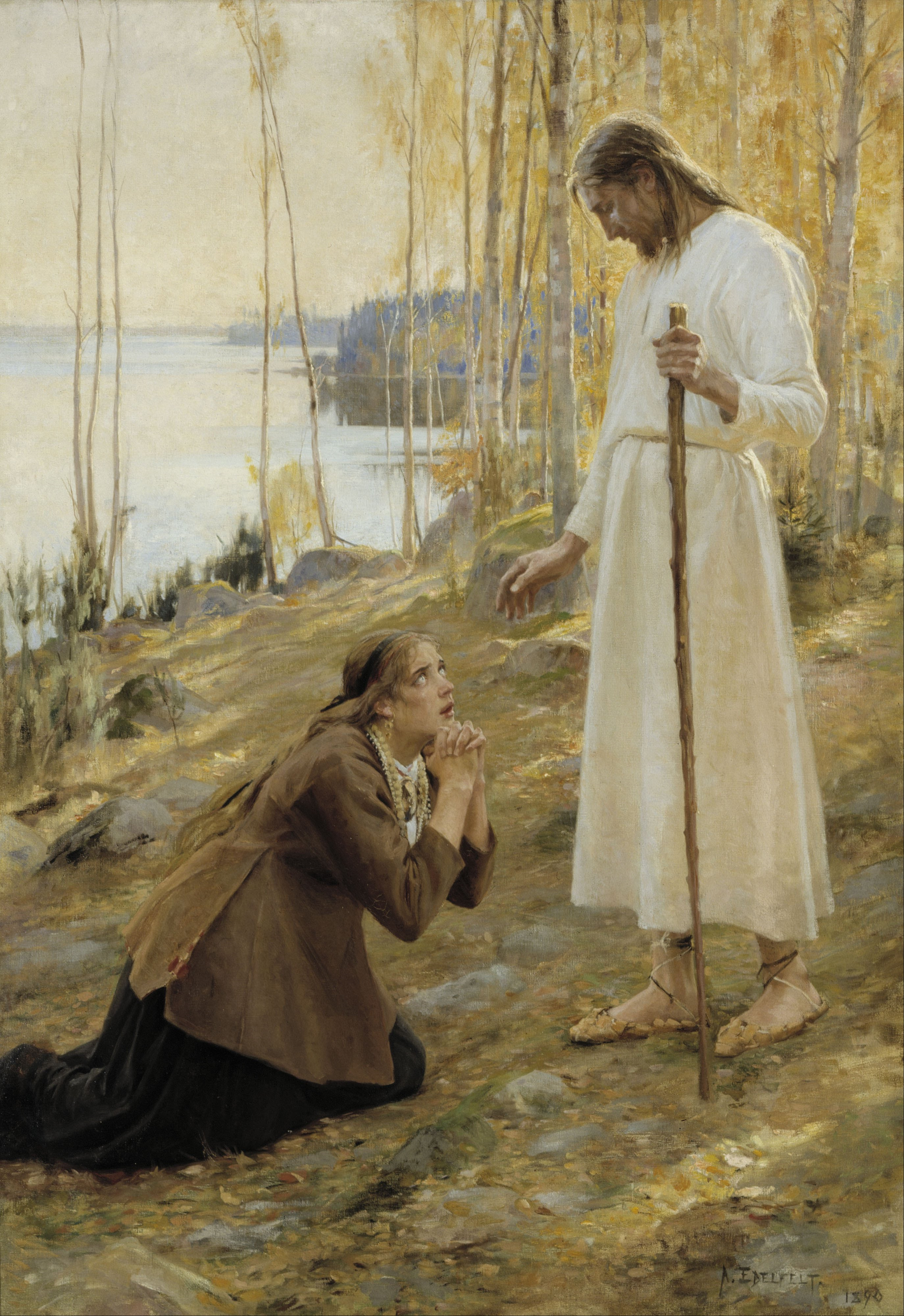
Christ and Mary Magdalene (1890) by Albert Edelfelt in a Finnish locale

Mary Magdalene in the pedimental sculpture The Last Judgement of La Madeleine (1899), by Philippe Joseph Henri Lemaire

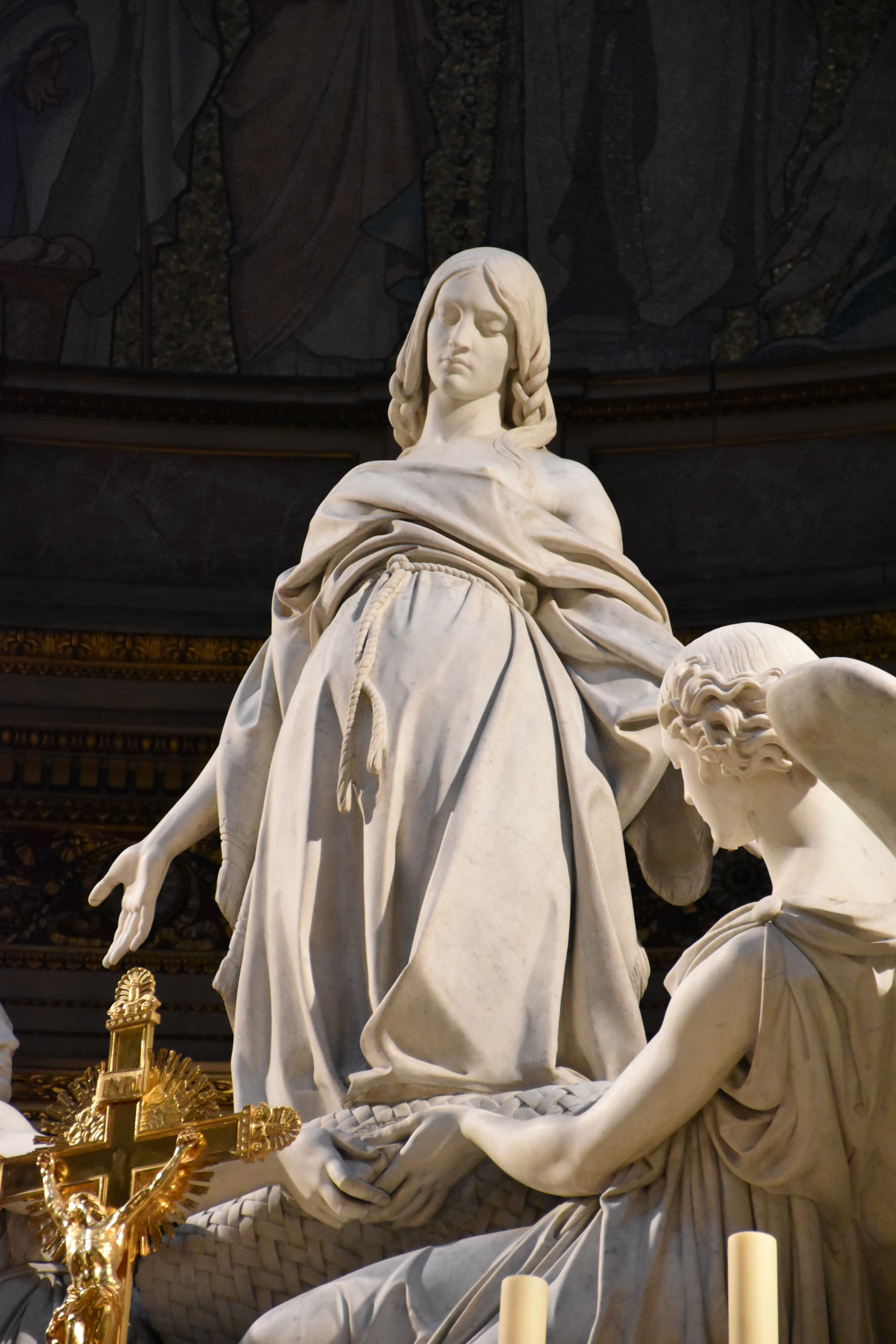
The Ecstasy of Mary Magdalene (1843) by Carlo Marochetti, located in La Madeleine

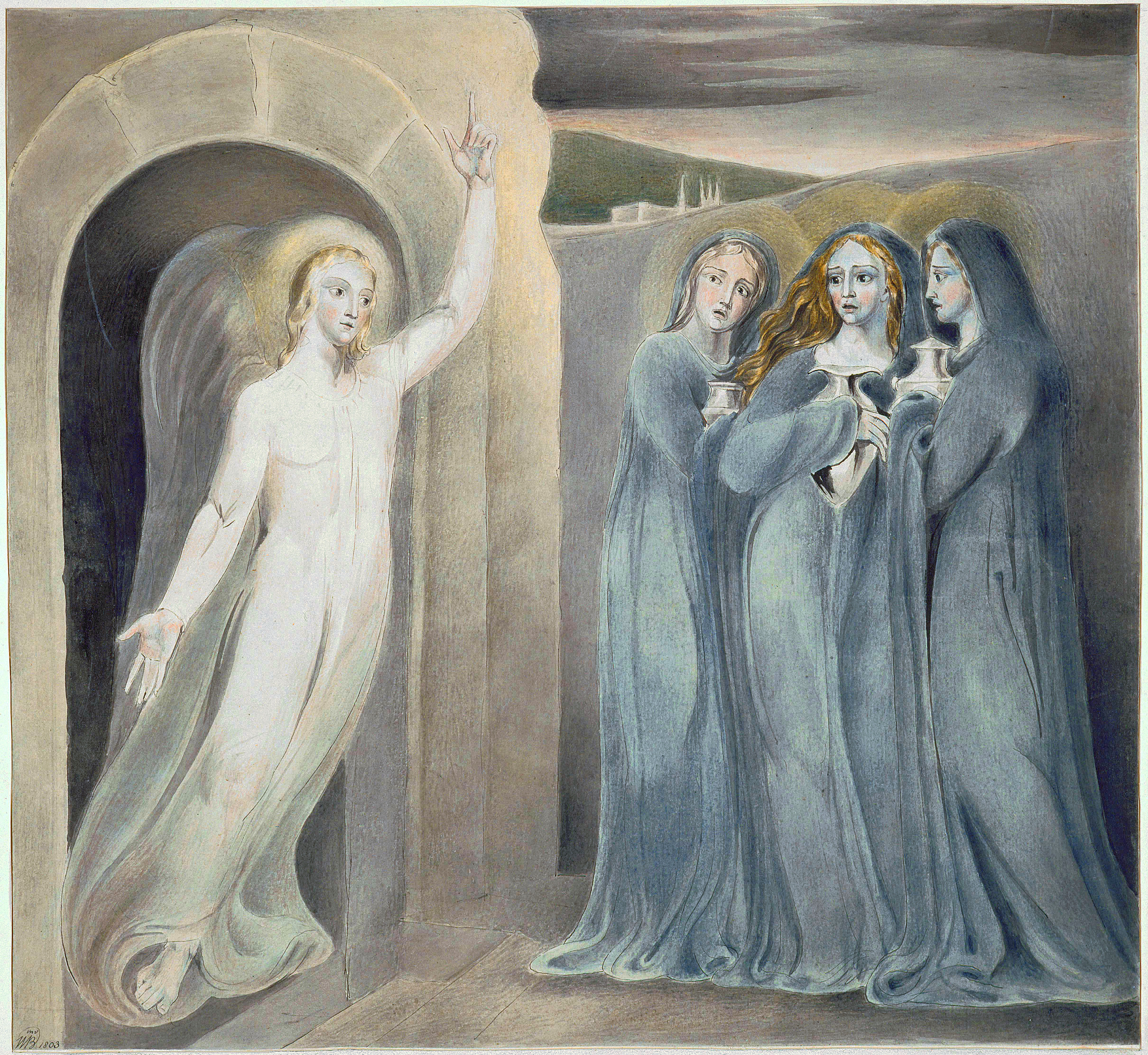
William Blake, The Three Marys at the Sepulchre (1800-3)

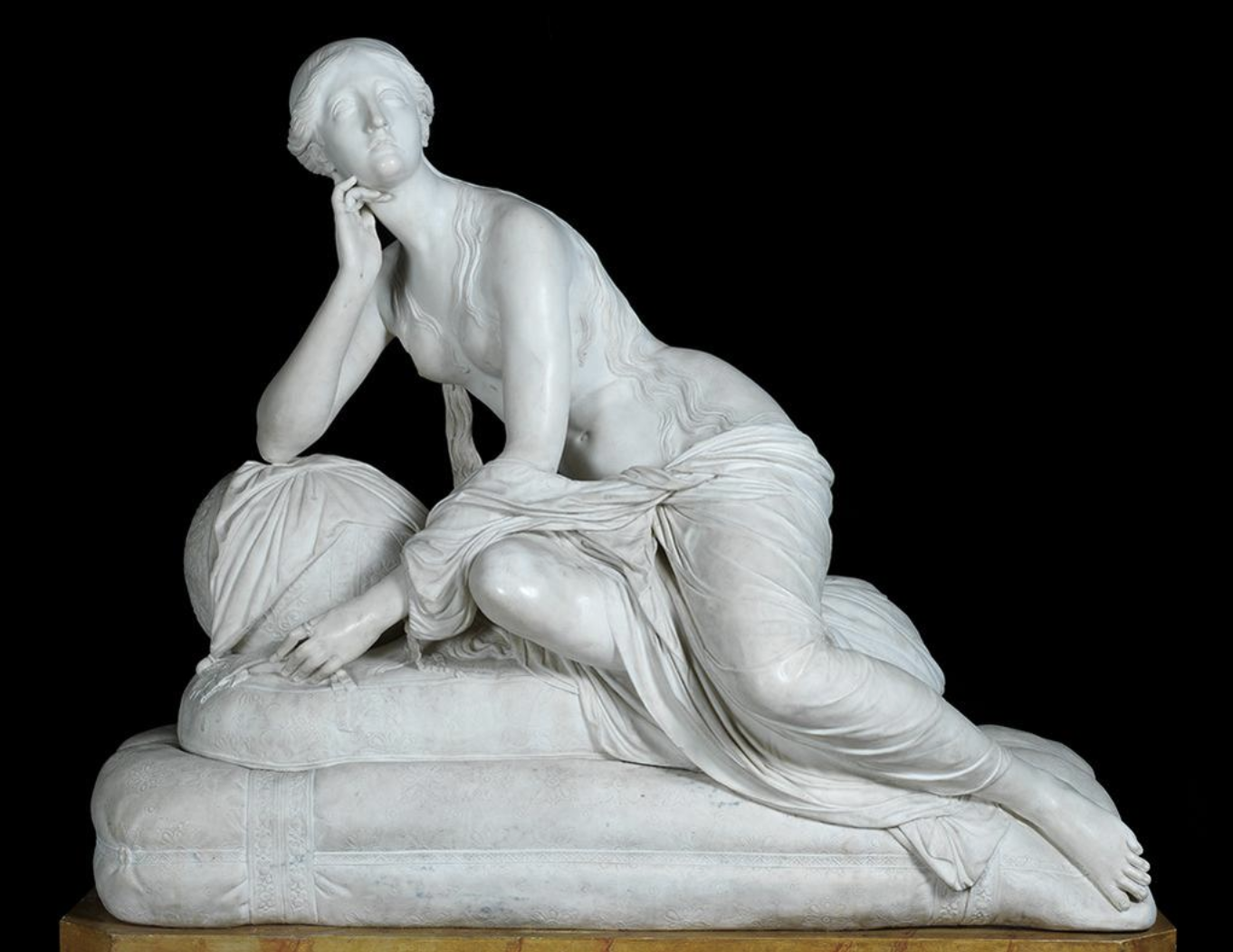
Pompeo Marchesi, Maddalena (1832)

=== In music ===
- The Byzantine composer Kassia wrote the only penitential hymn for Mary Magdalene, Kyrie hē en pollais.
- Marc-Antoine Charpentier:
  - Magdalena lugens voce sola cum symphonia, H.343 & H.343 a, motet for 1 voice, 2 treble instruments and continuo (1686–1687).
  - For Mary Magdalene, H.373, motet for 2 voices, 2 flutes and continuo (date unknown).
  - Magdalena lugens, H.388, motet for 3 voices and continuo (date unknown).
  - Dialogus inter Magdalena et Jesum 2 vocibus Canto e Alto cum organo, H.423, for 2 voices and continuo (date unknown).
- The German singer Sandra released “(I’ll Never Be) Maria Magdalena” in 1985. It was a major hit in Europe and is still Sandra’s most well-known song.
- Croatian singer Doris Dragović represented Croatia in the Eurovision Song Contest 1999 with the song "Marija Magdalena" (Croatian for 'Mary Magdalene') where it finished in fourth place with 118 points. The track also served as the lead single from Dragović's twelfth studio album, titled Krajem vijeka. Within Croatia and Balkan, the song achieved significant popularity and emerged as one of her most prominent songs.
- Singer-songwriter Tori Amos has multiple songs which reference Mary Magdalene, but the one song "Marys of the Sea" on her 2005 album The Beekeeper directly highlights Jesus and Mary Magdalene’s intimacy in the lyrics.
- American recording artist Lady Gaga assumes the role of Mary Magdalene, whom she found a "feminine force", in her 2011 song "Bloody Mary".
- English singer-songwriter FKA Twigs released album Magdalene in 2019, saying that she related to the way Mary Magdalene's narrative was revised.
- The French metal band Mürrmürr released an EP titled Magdala, which centers on the figure of Mary Magdalene.

== Religious views and veneration ==
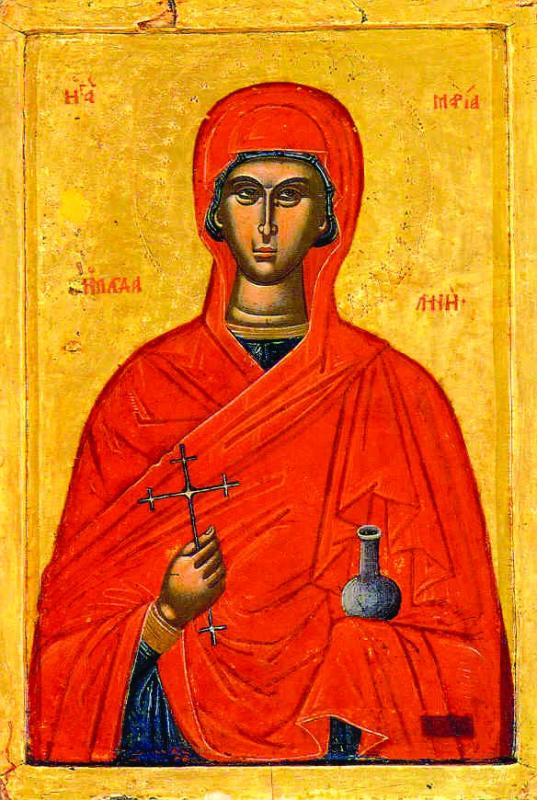
Eastern Orthodox icon of Mary Magdalene as a Myrrhbearer

=== Eastern Orthodox ===
The Eastern Orthodox Church has never identified Mary Magdalene with Mary of Bethany or the "sinful woman" who anoints Jesus in Luke 7:36–50 and has always taught that Mary was a virtuous woman her entire life, even before her conversion. They have never celebrated her as a penitent. Mary Magdalene's image did not become conflated with other women mentioned in Biblical texts until Pope Gregory the Great's sermon in the sixth century, and even then this only occurred in Western traditions. Instead, she has traditionally been honored as a "Myrrhbearer" (Μυροφόρος; the equivalent of the western Three Marys) and "Equal to the Apostles" (ἰσαπόστολος). For centuries, it has been the custom of many Eastern Orthodox Christians to share dyed and painted eggs, particularly on Easter Sunday. The eggs represent new life, and Christ bursting forth from the tomb. Among Eastern Orthodox Christians this sharing is accompanied by the proclamation "Christ is risen!" One folk tradition concerning Mary Magdalene says that following the death and resurrection of Jesus, she used her position to gain an invitation to a banquet given by the Roman emperor Tiberius in Rome. When she met him, she held a plain egg in her hand and exclaimed, "Christ is risen!". The emperor laughed, and said that Christ rising from the dead was as likely as the egg in her hand turning red while she held it. Before he finished speaking, the egg in her hand turned a bright red and she continued proclaiming the Gospel to the entire imperial house.

=== Catholicism ===
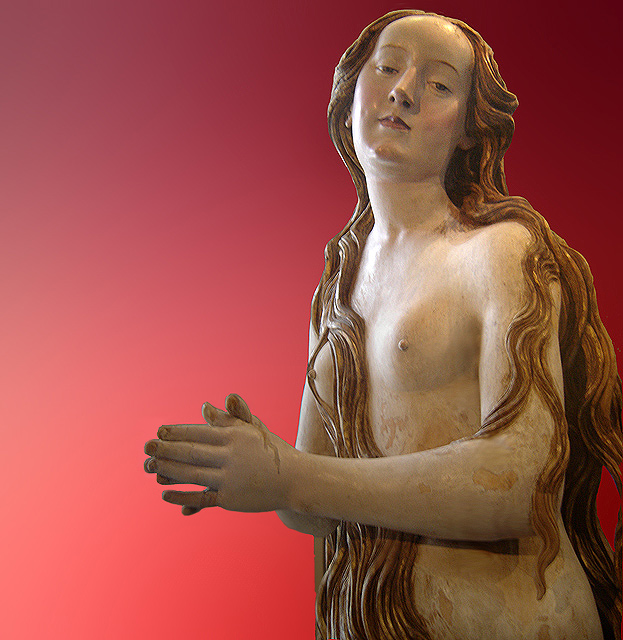
Mary Magdalene by Gregor Erhart (died 1525)

During the Counter-Reformation and Baroque periods (late 16th and 17th centuries), the description "penitent" was added to the indication of her name on her feast day, July 22. It had not yet been added at the time of the Tridentine calendar of 1569 and is no longer found in the present General Roman Calendar but, once added, it remained until the General Roman Calendar of 1960. The Gospel reading in the Tridentine Mass was Luke 7:36–50 (the sinful woman anointing the feet of Jesus), while in the present version of the Roman Rite of Mass it is John 20:1–2, 11–18 (meeting of Mary Magdalene with Jesus after his resurrection).

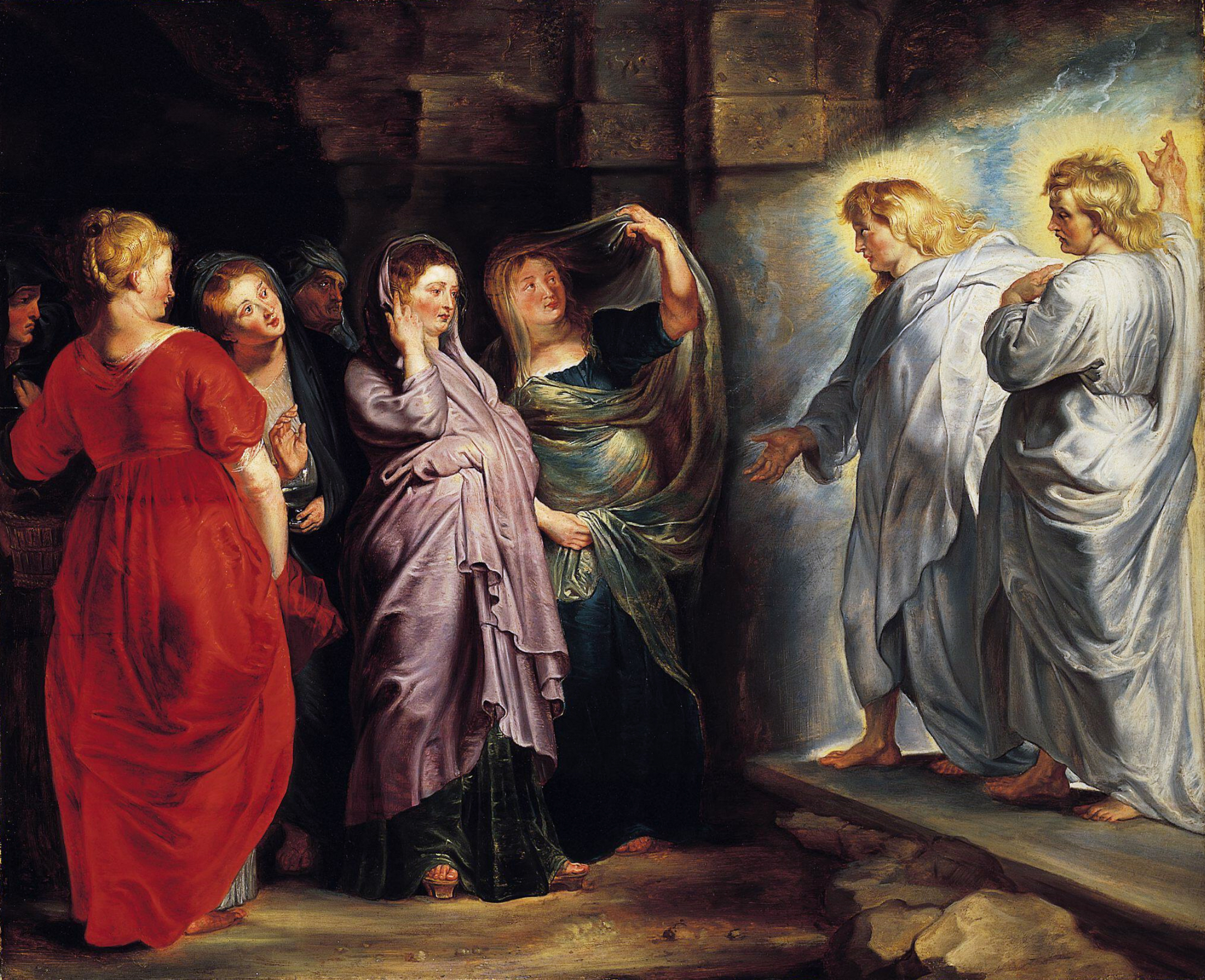
The Three Marys at the Tomb by Peter Paul Rubens, with Mary Magdalene in red

According to Darrell Bock, the title of apostola apostolorum first appears in the 10th century, but Katherine Ludwig Jansen says she found no reference to it earlier than the 12th century, by which time it was already commonplace. She mentions in particular Hugh of Cluny (1024–1109), Peter Abelard (1079–1142), and Bernard of Clairvaux (1090–1153) among those who gave Mary Magdalene the title of apostolorum apostola (apostle of the apostles). Jane Schaberg adds Geoffrey of Vendôme (c. 1065/70 – 1132).

The equivalent of the phrase apostolorum apostola may have appeared already in the 9th century. Chapter XXVII of the Life of Mary Magdalene attributed to Hrabanus Maurus (c. 780 – 784 February 856) is headed: Ubi Magdalenam Christus ad apostolos mittit apostolam (Wherein Christ sends Magdalene as an apostle to the apostles). The same chapter says she did not delay in exercising the office of apostolate with which he had been honored (apostolatus officio quo honorata fuerat fungi non distulit). Raymond E. Brown, commenting on this fact, remarks that Hrabanus Maurus frequently applies the word "apostle" to Mary Magdalene in this work. However the work is actually no earlier than the 12th century. Because of Mary Magdalene's position as an apostle, though not one of those who became official witnesses to the resurrection, the Catholic Church honored her by reciting the Gloria on her feast day – the only female saint so honored apart from Mary, the mother of Jesus. In his apostolic letter Mulieris Dignitatem ("On the dignity and vocation of women", parts 67–69) dated August 15, 1988, Pope John Paul II dealt with the Easter events in relation to the women being present at the tomb after the Resurrection, in a section entitled 'First Witnesses of the Resurrection':

The women are the first at the tomb. They are the first to find it empty. They are the first to hear 'He is not here. He has risen, as he said.' They are the first to embrace his feet. The women are also the first to be called to announce this truth to the Apostles. The Gospel of John emphasizes the special role of Mary Magdalene. She is the first to meet the Risen Christ. [...] Hence she came to be called "the apostle of the Apostles". Mary Magdalene was the first eyewitness of the Risen Christ, and for this reason she was also the first to bear witness to him before the Apostles. This event, in a sense, crowns all that has been said previously about Christ entrusting divine truths to women as well as men.

— John Paul II

On June 10, 2016, the Congregation for Divine Worship and the Discipline of the Sacraments issued a decree which elevated Mary's liturgical commemoration from an obligatory memorial to a feast day, like that of most of the Apostles (Peter and Paul are jointly commemorated with a solemnity). The Mass and Liturgy of the Hours (Divine Office) remain the same as they were, except that a specific preface was added to the Mass to refer to her explicitly as the "Apostle to the Apostles".

=== Protestantism ===
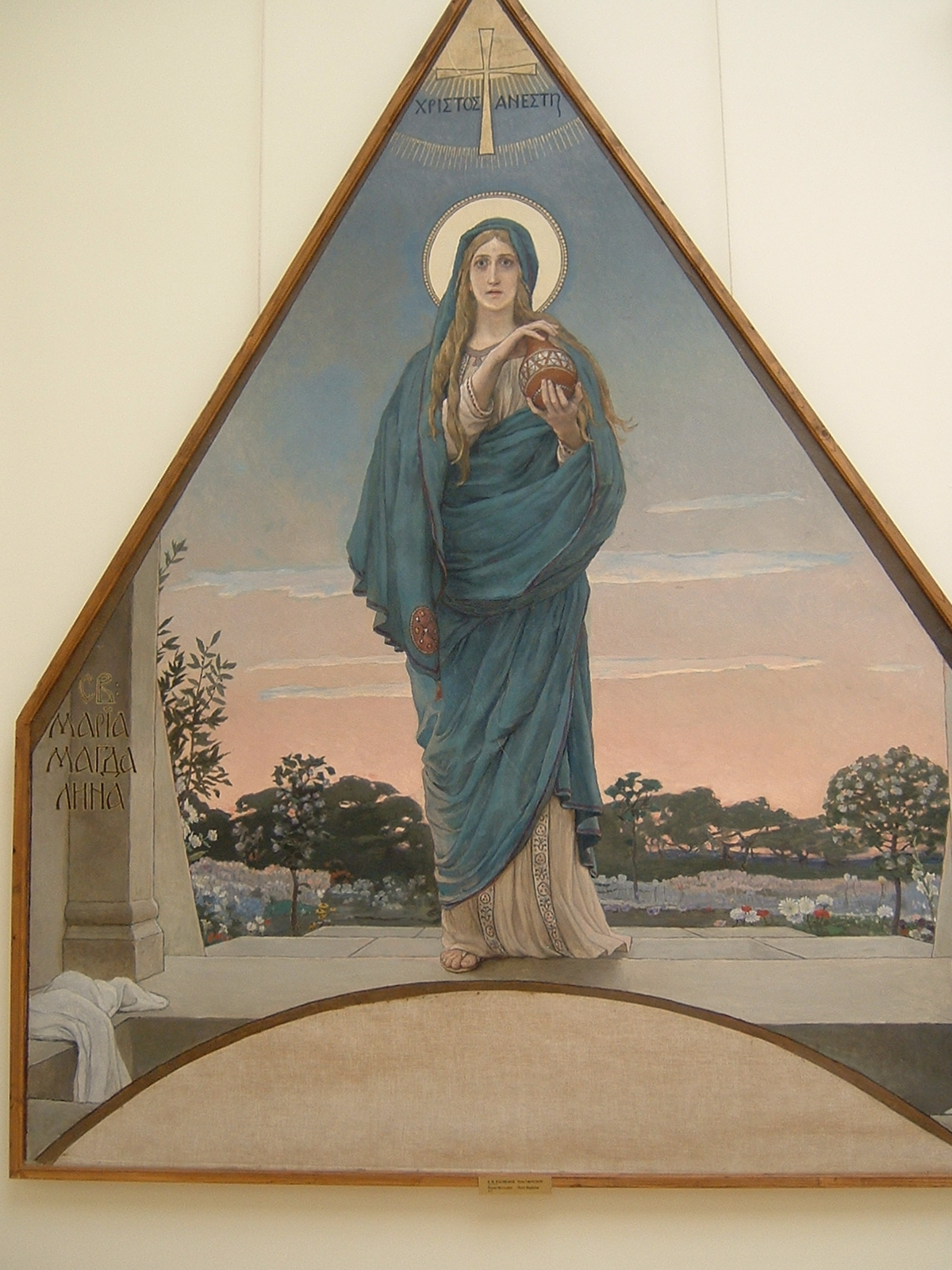
Icon of Saint Mary Magdalene depicted as one of the Myrrhbearers with the words "Christ is Risen" in Greek at the top, depicting her discovery of the empty tomb

The 1549 Book of Common Prayer had on July 22 a feast of Saint Mary Magdalene, with the same Scripture readings as in the Tridentine Mass and with a newly composed collect: "Merciful father geue us grace, that we neuer presume to synne through the example of anye creature, but if it shall chaunce vs at any tyme to offende thy dyuine maiestie: that then we maye truly repent, and lament the same, after the example of Mary Magdalene, and by lyuelye faythe obtayne remission of all oure sinnes: throughe the onely merites of thy sonne oure sauiour Christ." The 1552 edition omitted the feast of Saint Mary Magdalene, which was restored to the Book of Common Prayer only after some 400 years.

Modern Protestants honor her as a disciple and friend of Jesus. Anglican Christians refer to her as a saint and may follow her example of repentance; While some interpret the Thirty-Nine Articles as forbidding them to call upon her for intercession, other Anglicans, citing the Episcopal burial service, say they can ask the saint to pray for them.

The Evangelical Lutheran Church in America honors Mary Magdalene on July 22 as an apostle. Her feast day is marked as a lesser festival, which are defined as "days when we celebrate the life of Christ, the witness of those who accompanied and testified to him, and the gifts of God in the church".

Presbyterians honor her as the "apostle to the apostles" and, in the book Methodist Theology, Kenneth Wilson describes her as, "in effect", one of the "first missionaries".

Mary Magdalene is remembered in the Church of England with a Festival and in the Episcopal Church with a Major Feast on July 22.

=== Baháʼí Faith ===
There are many references to Mary Magdalene in the writings of the Baháʼí Faith, where she enjoys an exalted status as a heroine of faith and the "archetypal woman of all cycles". `Abdu'l-Bahá, the son of the founder of the religion, said that she was "the channel of confirmation" to Jesus's disciples, a "heroine" who "re-established the faith of the apostles" and was "a light of nearness in his kingdom". `Abdu'l-Bahá also wrote that "her reality is ever shining from the horizon of Christ", "her face is shining and beaming forth on the horizon of the universe forevermore" and that "her candle is, in the assemblage of the world, lighted till eternity". `Abdu'l-Bahá considered her to be the supreme example of how women are completely equal with men in the sight of God and can at times even exceed men in holiness and greatness. Indeed he said that she surpassed all the men of her time, and that "crowns studded with the brilliant jewels of guidance" were upon her head.

The Baháʼí writings also expand upon the scarce references to her life in the canonical Gospels, with a wide array of extra-canonical stories about her and sayings which are not recorded in any other extant historical sources. `Abdu'l-Bahá said that Mary traveled to Rome and spoke before the emperor Tiberius, which is presumably why Pilate was later recalled to Rome for his cruel treatment of the Jews (a tradition also attested to in the Eastern Orthodox Church). Baháʼís have noted parallels between Mary Magdalene and the Babí heroine-poet Táhirih. The two are similar in many respects, with Mary Magdalene often being viewed as a Christian antecedent of the latter, while Táhirih in her own right could be described as the spiritual return of the Magdalene; especially given their common, shared attributes of "knowledge, steadfastness, courage, virtue and will power", in addition to their importance within the religious movements of Christianity and the Baháʼí Faith as female leaders.

== Relics ==
Many of the alleged relics of the saint are held in Catholic churches in France, especially at Saint-Maximin-la-Sainte-Baume, where her skull (see above) and the noli me tangere are on display; the latter being a piece of forehead flesh and skin said to be from the spot touched by Jesus at the post-resurrection encounter in the garden. A tibia also kept at Saint-Maximin-la-Sainte-Baume is the object of an annual procession.

Her left hand relic is kept in the Simonopetra Monastery on Mount Athos.

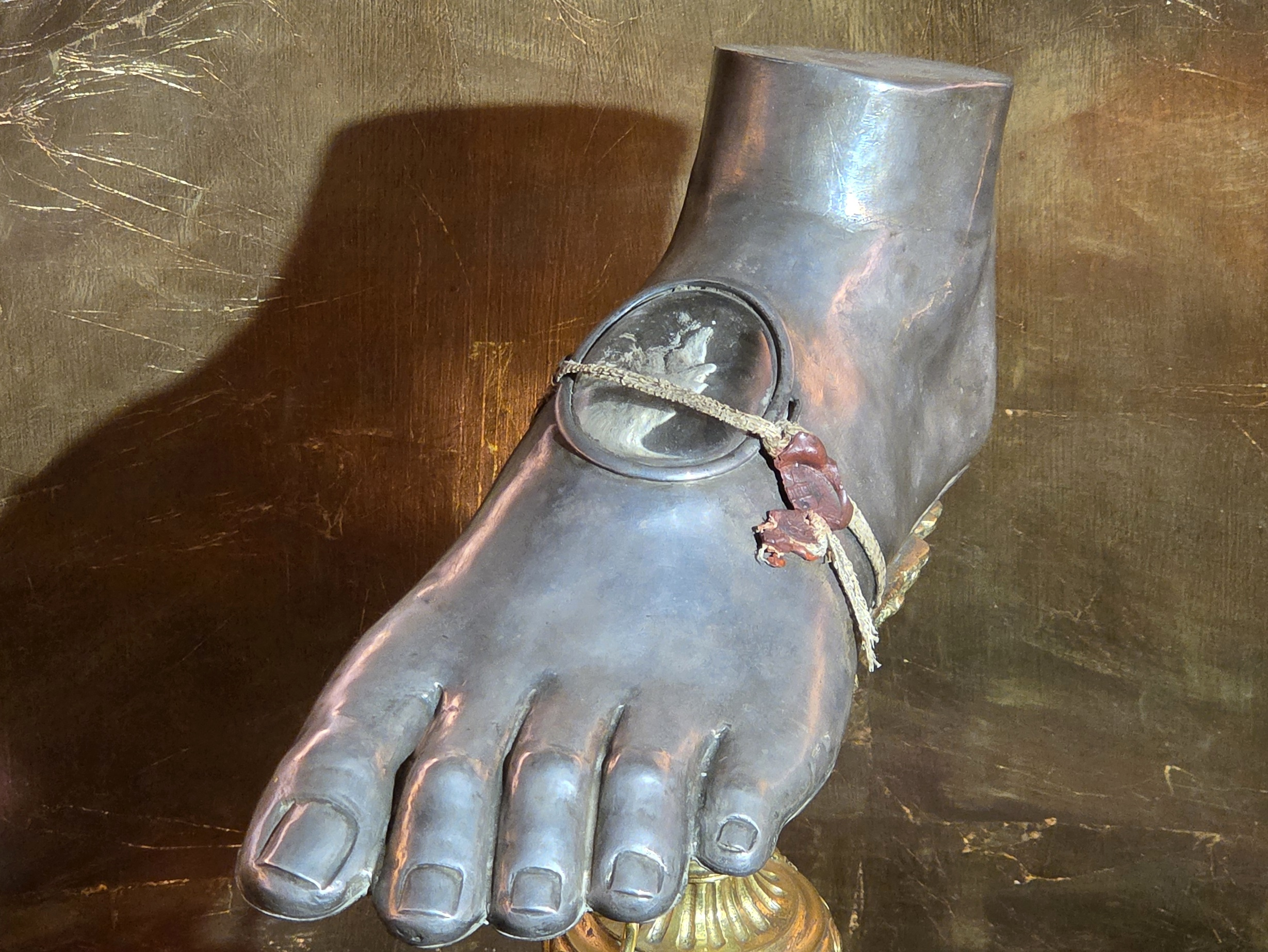
Left foot of Saint Mary Magdalene, kept in the Basilica of San Giovanni de' Fiorentini in Rome.

The left foot, contained in a reliquary made by Benvenuto Cellini is kept in the church of San Giovanni dei Fiorentini in Rome. It is considered the first foot that entered the Holy Sepulcher after Christ's Resurrection. For this reason it was previously kept in a chapel at the entrance to Ponte Sant'Angelo, as the last of the major relics before reaching Saint Peter's tomb.

== Portrayal in Gnostic writings ==
Mary is a central figure in Gnostic Christian writings, including the Dialogue of the Savior, the Pistis Sophia, the Gospel of Thomas, the Gospel of Philip, and the Gospel of Mary. In these texts, Mary Magdalene is portrayed as a visionary and leader of the early movement whom Jesus loved more than he loved the other disciples, and the only one who truly understood his teachings. These texts were written long after the death of the historical Mary Magdalene. They are not regarded by bible scholars as reliable sources of information about her life. Sanders summarizes the scholarly consensus that:

... very, very little in the apocryphal gospels could conceivably go back to the time of Jesus. They are legendary and mythological. Of all the apocryphal material, only some of the sayings in the Gospel of Thomas are worth consideration.

Nonetheless, the texts have been frequently promoted in modern works as though they were reliable. Such works often support sensationalist statements about Jesus and Mary Magdalene's relationship.

=== Dialogue of the Saviour ===
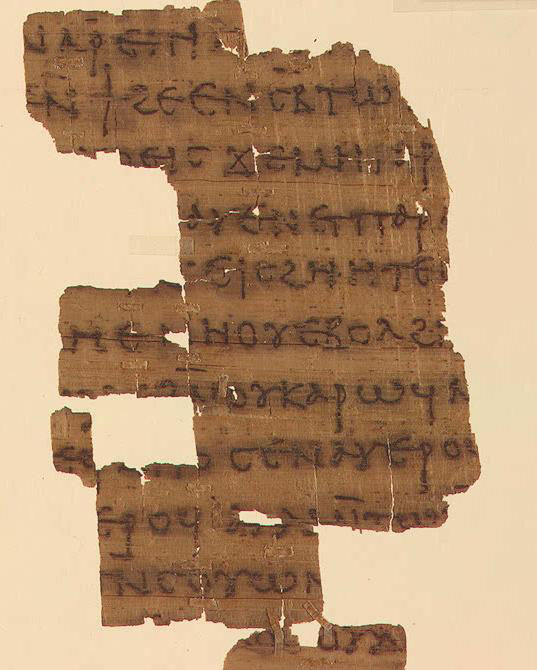
Fragment of a fourth-century text of the apocryphal Dialogue of the Saviour, in which Mary Magdalene is a central figure

The earliest dialogue between Jesus and Mary Magdalene is probably the Dialogue of the Saviour, a badly damaged Gnostic text discovered in the Nag Hammadi library in 1945. The dialogue consists of a conversation between Jesus, Mary and two apostles – Thomas the Apostle and Matthew the Apostle. In saying 53, the Dialogue attributes to Mary three aphorisms that are attributed to Jesus in the New Testament: "The wickedness of each day [is sufficient]. Workers deserve their food. Disciples resemble their teachers." The narrator commends Mary stating, "she spoke this utterance as a woman who understood everything."

=== Pistis Sophia ===
The Pistis Sophia, generally dated to the third century, with parts possibly as late as the fourth, is among the most extensive Gnostic writings to survive. It was discovered in the 18th century in a large volume containing numerous early Gnostic treatises. The document takes the form of a long dialogue in which Jesus answers his followers' questions. Of the 64 questions, 39 are presented by a woman who is referred to as Mary or Mary Magdalene. At one point, Jesus says, "Mary, thou blessed one, whom I will perfect in all mysteries of those of the height, discourse in openness, thou, whose heart is raised to the kingdom of heaven more than all thy brethren." At another point, he tells her, "Well done, Mary. You are more blessed than all women on earth, because you will be the fullness of fullness and the completion of completion." Simon Peter, annoyed at Mary's dominance of the conversation, tells Jesus, "My master, we cannot endure this woman who gets in our way and does not let any of us speak, though she talks all the time." Mary defends herself, saying, "My master, I understand in my mind that I can come forward at any time to interpret what Pistis Sophia [a female deity] has said, but I am afraid of Peter, because he threatens me and hates our gender." Jesus assures her, "Any of those filled with the spirit of light will come forward to interpret what I say: no one will be able to oppose them."

=== Gospel of Thomas ===
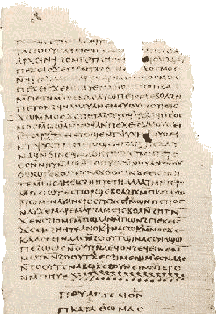
Last page of the Gospel of Thomas from Nag Hammadi, containing the account of Jesus's reaffirmation of Mary's authority to Peter

The Gospel of Thomas, usually dated to the late first or early second century, was among the ancient texts discovered in the Nag Hammadi library in 1945. The Gospel of Thomas consists entirely of 114 sayings attributed to Jesus. Many of these sayings are similar to ones in the canonical gospels, but others are completely unlike anything found in the New Testament. Some scholars believe that at least a few of these sayings may authentically be traced back to the historical Jesus. Two of the sayings reference a woman named "Mary", who is generally regarded as Mary Magdalene. In saying 21, Mary herself asks Jesus, "Whom are your disciples like?" Jesus responds, "They are like children who have settled in a field which is not theirs. When the owners of the field come, they will say, 'Let us have back our field.' They (will) undress in their presence in order to let them have back their field and to give it back to them." Following this, Jesus continues his explanation with a parable about the owner of a house and a thief, ending with the common rhetoric, "Whoever has ears to hear let him hear."

Mary's mention in saying 114, however, has generated considerable controversy:

Simon Peter said to them: Let Mary go forth from among us, for women are not worthy of the life. Jesus said: Behold, I shall lead her, that I may make her male, in order that she also may become a living spirit like you males. For every woman who makes herself male shall enter into the kingdom of heaven.

— Meyer 1992

In the ancient world, many patriarchal cultures believed that women were inferior to men and that they were, in essence, "imperfect men" who had not fully developed. When Peter challenges Mary's authority in this saying, he does so on the widely accepted premise that she is a woman and therefore an inferior human being. When Jesus rebukes him for this, he bases his response on the same premise, stating that Mary and all faithful women like her will become men and that salvation is therefore open to all, even those who are presently women.

=== Gospel of Philip ===
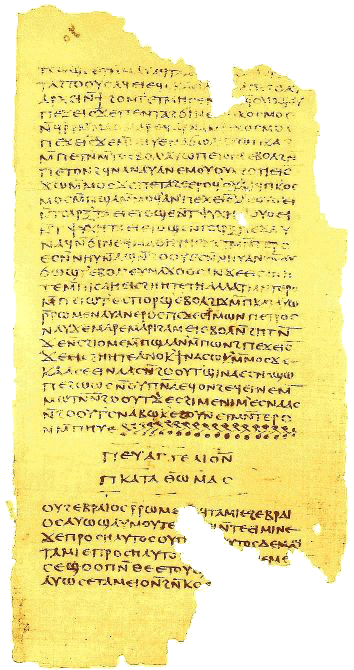
Text of the Gospel of Philip from Nag Hammadi

The Gospel of Philip, dating from the second or third century, survives in part among the texts found in Nag Hammadi in 1945. (Note: The Old and New Testament and Gnostic contexts and the text are discussed by Grant 1961, pp. 129–140.) In a manner very similar to John 19:25–26, the Gospel of Philip presents Mary Magdalene among Jesus's female entourage, adding that she was his koinônos, a Greek word variously translated in contemporary versions as 'partner, associate, comrade, companion':

There were three who always walked with the Lord: Mary, his mother, and her sister, and Magdalene, who was called his companion. His sister, (Note: This confusing reference is already in the original manuscript. It is not clear, if the text refers to Jesus's or his mother's sister, or whether the intention is to say something else.) his mother and his companion were each a Mary.

— Grant 1961, pp. 129–140

The Gospel of Philip uses cognates of koinônos and Coptic equivalents to refer to the literal pairing of men and women in marriage and sexual intercourse, but also metaphorically, referring to a spiritual partnership, and the reunification of the Gnostic Christian with the divine realm. The Gospel of Philip also contains another passage relating to Jesus's relationship with Mary Magdalene. The text is badly fragmented, and speculated but unreliable additions are shown in brackets:

And the companion of the [saviour was] Mary Magdalene. [Christ] loved Mary more than [all] the disciples, [and used to] kiss her [often] on the [–]. (Note: Its still disputed till date on which body part was mentioned here) The rest of the disciples [were offended by it and expressed disapproval]. They said to him, "Why do you love her more than all of us?" The Saviour answered and said to them, "Why do I not love you like her? When a blind man and one who sees are both together in darkness, they are no different from one another. When the light comes, then he who sees will see the light, and he who is blind will remain in darkness."

— Grant 1961, pp. 129–140

For early Christians, kissing did not have a romantic connotation and it was common for Christians to kiss their fellow believers as a way of greeting. (Note: See, for instance, 1 Thessalonians 5:26, Romans 16:16, 1 Corinthians 16:20, 2 Corinthians 13:12, Mark 14:43–45, Matthew 26:47–50, Luke 22:48, and 1 Peter 5:14) This tradition is still practiced in many Christian congregations today and is known as the "kiss of peace". Ehrman explains that, in the context of the Gospel of Philip, the kiss of peace is used as a symbol for the passage of truth from one person to another and that it is not in any way an act of "divine foreplay".

=== Gospel of Mary ===
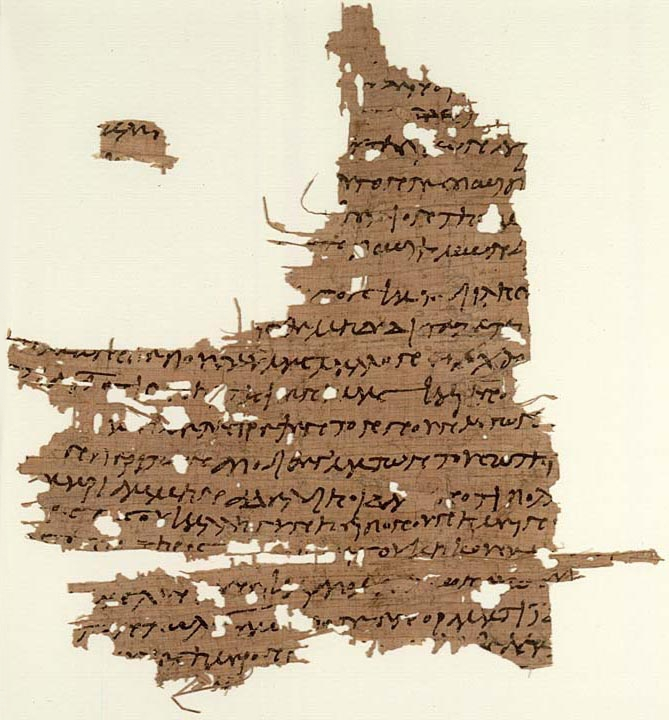
Papyrus Oxyrhynchus L 3525, a fragment of the Greek text of the Gospel of Mary

The Gospel of Mary is the only surviving Gnostic text named after a woman and was probably written over a century after the historical Mary Magdalene's death. It is not attributed to her and its author is anonymous. Instead, it received its title because it is about her. King judges it "far more plausible that the teachings of the Gospel of Mary developed among Christians whose thought world was shaped by popular philosophy steeped in the ideas of Platonism and Stoicism". Philip Jenkins writes that "one reason for suggesting a late date for Mary is that the work contains a type of Gnostic mythologizing which is characteristic of the late second or early third century and suggests the influence of Valentinus". Craig A. Evans writes that "we find in it nothing that with any confidence can be traced to the first century or traced back to the life and ministry of the historical Jesus and the historical Mary Magdalene".

Mary first appears in the second part of the text, in which she tells the other disciples, who are all in fright for their own lives: "Do not weep or grieve or be in doubt, for his grace will be with you all and will protect you. Rather, let us praise his greatness, for he has prepared us and made us truly human." Unlike in the Gospel of Thomas, where women can only be saved by becoming men, in the Gospel of Mary, they can be saved just as they are. Peter approaches Mary and asks her:

"Sister we know that the Saviour loved you more than the rest of woman. Tell us the words of the Saviour which you remember which you know, but we do not, nor have we heard them". Mary answered and said, "What is hidden from you I will proclaim to you". And she began to speak to them these words: "I", she said, "I saw the Lord in a vision and I said to Him, Lord I saw you today in a vision".

— de Boer 2005, p. 74

Mary then proceeds to describe the Gnostic cosmology in depth, revealing that she is the only one who has understood Jesus's true teachings. Andrew the Apostle challenges Mary, insisting, "Say what you think about what she said, but I do not believe the savior said this. These teachings are strange ideas." Peter responds, saying, "Did he really speak with a woman in private, without our knowledge? Should we all listen to her? Did he prefer her to us?" Andrew and Peter's responses are intended to demonstrate that they do not understand Jesus's teachings and that it is really only Mary who truly understands. Matthew the Apostle comes to Mary's defense, giving a sharp rebuke to Peter: "Peter, you are always angry. Now I see you arguing against this woman like an adversary. If the savior made her worthy, who are you to reject her? Surely the savior knows her well. That is why he loved her more than us."

=== Borborite scriptures ===
The Borborites, also known as the Phibionites, were an early Christian Gnostic sect during the late fourth century who had numerous scriptures involving Mary Magdalene, including The Questions of Mary, The Greater Questions of Mary, The Lesser Questions of Mary, and The Birth of Mary. None of these texts have survived to the present, but they are mentioned by the early Christian heretic-hunter Epiphanius of Salamis in his Panarion. Epiphanius says that the Greater Questions of Mary contained an episode in which, during a post-resurrection appearance, Jesus took Mary to the top of a mountain, where he pulled a woman out of his side and engaged in sexual intercourse with her. Then, upon ejaculating, Jesus drank his own semen and told Mary, "Thus we must do, that we may live." Upon hearing this, Mary instantly fainted, to which Jesus responded by helping her up and telling her, "O thou of little faith, wherefore didst thou doubt?" This story was supposedly the basis for the Borborite Eucharist ritual in which they allegedly engaged in orgies and drank semen and menstrual blood as the "body and blood of Christ" respectively. Ehrman casts doubt on the accuracy of Epiphanius's summary, commenting that "the details of Epiphanius's description sound very much like what you can find in the ancient rumor mill about secret societies in the ancient world".

== Speculations ==
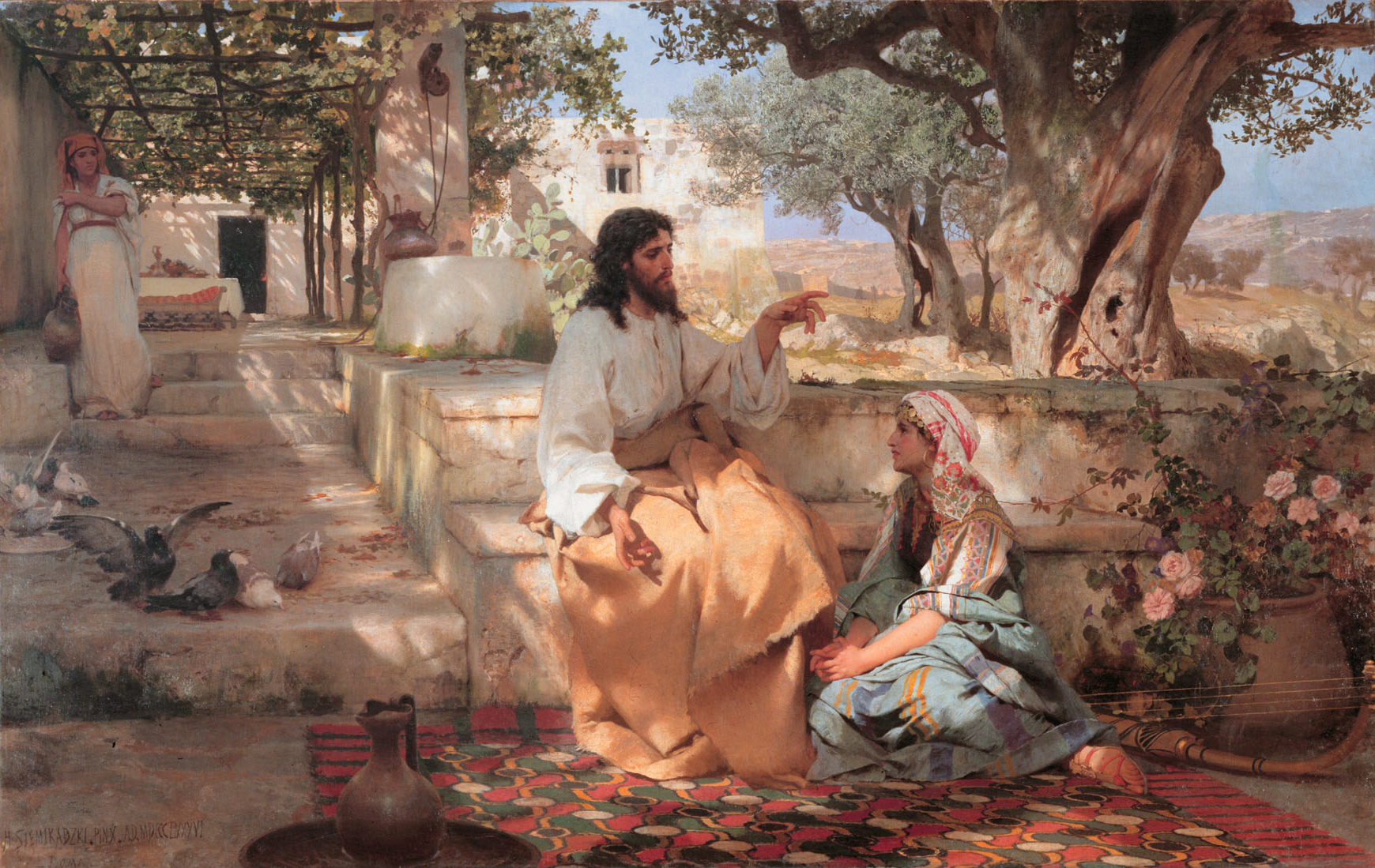
Christ with Martha and Mary (1886) by Henryk Siemiradzki, showing the conflated "composite Magdalene" sitting at Jesus's feet while her sister Martha performs chores.

Some writers have speculated that the "Beloved Disciple" of the Gospel of John might originally have been Mary Magdalene. Richard J. Hooper says that "Perhaps we should not altogether reject the possibility that some Johannine Christians considered Mary Magdalene to be 'the disciple whom Jesus loved',"although he does not endorse the identification. Esther A. de Boer says it is "one possibility among others". However, no extant manuscripts attest to this, the beloved disciple is only ever referred to in the masculine inflection, and an instance where Mary speaks to the beloved disciple appears in John 20:2.

Dan Brown's 2003 bestselling mystery thriller novel The Da Vinci Code popularized a number of erroneous ideas about Mary Magdalene, including that she was a member of the tribe of Benjamin, that she was Jesus's wife, that she was pregnant at the crucifixion, and that she gave birth to Jesus's child, who became the founder of a bloodline which survives to this very day. There is no historical evidence (from the canonical or apocryphal gospels, other early Christian writings, or any other ancient sources) to support these statements. The Da Vinci Code also purports that the figure of the "beloved disciple" to Jesus's right in Leonardo da Vinci's Last Supper is Mary Magdalene, disguised as one of the male disciples; art historians maintain that the figure is, in reality, the apostle John, who only appears feminine due to Leonardo's characteristic fascination with blurring the lines between the sexes, a quality which is found in his other paintings, such as Saint John the Baptist (painted c. 1513 – 1516). Furthermore, according to Ross King, an expert on Italian art, Mary Magdalene's appearance at the last supper would not have been controversial and Leonardo would have had no motive to disguise her as one of the other disciples, since she was widely venerated in her role as the "apostle to the apostles" and patron of the Dominican Order, for whom The Last Supper was painted. There would have even been precedent for it, since the earlier Italian Renaissance painter Fra Angelico had included her in his painting of the Last Supper. Numerous works were written in response to the historical inaccuracies in The Da Vinci Code, but the novel still exerted massive influence on how members of the general public viewed Mary Magdalene.

In 2012, scholar Karen L. King published the Gospel of Jesus's Wife, a purported Coptic papyrus fragment in which Jesus says: "My wife ... she will be able to be my disciple." The overwhelming consensus of scholars is that the fragment is a modern forgery, and in 2016, King herself said that the alleged Gospel was probably a forgery.

Ehrman states that the historical sources reveal absolutely nothing about Jesus's sexuality and that there is no evidence whatsoever to support the idea that Jesus and Mary Magdalene were married or that they had any kind of sexual or romantic relationship. None of the canonical gospels imply such a thing and, even in the late Gnostic gospels, where Mary is shown as Jesus's closest disciple, the relationship between them is not sexual. The extremely late Greater Questions of Mary, which has not survived, allegedly portrayed Mary not as Jesus's wife or partner, but rather as an unwilling voyeur. Ehrman says that the Essenes, a contemporary Jewish sect who shared many views with Jesus, and the apostle Paul, Jesus's later follower, both lived in unmarried celibacy, so it is not unreasonable to conclude that Jesus did as well.

Furthermore, according to Mark 12:25, Jesus taught that marriage would not exist at all in the coming kingdom of God. Since Jesus taught that people should live as though the kingdom had already arrived, this teaching implied a life of unmarried celibacy. Ehrman says that, if Jesus had been married to Mary Magdalene, the authors of the gospels would definitely have mentioned it, since they mention all his other family members, including his mother Mary, his father Joseph, his four brothers, and his at least two sisters.

Maurice Casey rejects the idea of Mary Magdalene as Jesus's wife as nothing more than wild popular sensationalism. Jeffrey J. Kripal writes that "the historical sources are simply too contradictory and simultaneously too silent" to make absolute declarations regarding Jesus's sexuality.

== See also ==
- Beloved disciple
- Noli me tangere
- Feast of Saint Mary Magdalene
- Cathedral of the Madeleine (Salt Lake City, Utah)
- St. Mary Magdalene's Church
- Jesus' interactions with women
- Mary Magdalene, patron saint archive
- Miriai – Mandaean heroine that some equate with Mary Magdalene
- New Testament people named Mary
- Noli me tangere casket
- Saint Sarah
- St. Mary Magdalene's flood
- The Magdalen Reading
