= John 21 =

- ← chapter 20 Acts 1 →
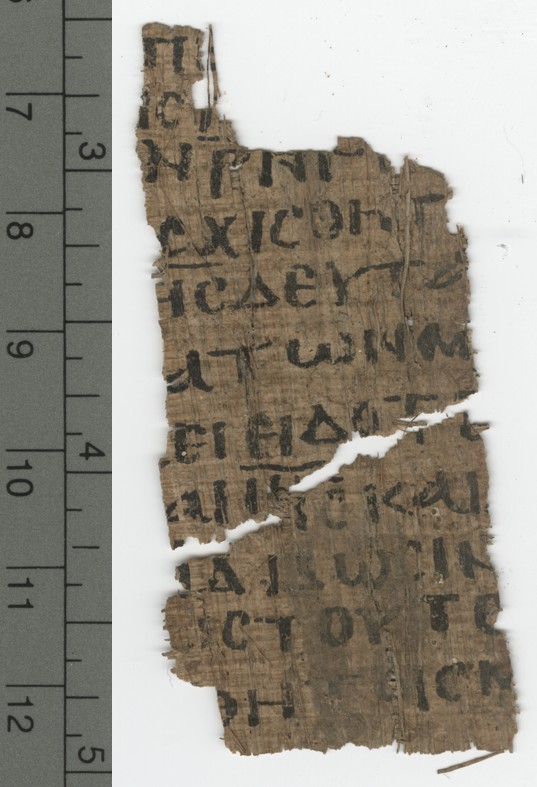
- John 21:11–14, 22–24 in Papyrus 122 (4th/5th century)
- Book: Gospel of John
- Category: Gospel
- Christian Bible part: New Testament
- Order in the Christian part: 4

John 21 is the twenty-first and final chapter of the Gospel of John in the New Testament of the Christian Bible. It contains an account of a post-crucifixion appearance in Galilee, which the text describes as the third time when Jesus had appeared to his disciples. In the course of this chapter, there is a miraculous catch of 153 fish, the confirmation of Peter's love for Jesus, a foretelling of Peter's death, and a comment about the beloved disciple's future.

== Text ==
The original text was written in Koine Greek. This chapter is divided into 25 verses.

=== Textual witnesses ===
Some early manuscripts containing the text of this chapter are:

- Papyrus 66 (c. AD 200; extant verses 1–9, 12, 17)
- Papyrus 109 (3rd century; extant verses 18–20, 23–25)
- Codex Vaticanus (325–350)
- Codex Sinaiticus (330–360; complete)
- Papyrus 122 (4th/5th century; extant verses 11–14, 22–24)
- Codex Bezae (c. 400)
- Codex Alexandrinus (400–440)
- Codex Ephraemi Rescriptus (c. 450; complete)
- Papyrus 59 (7th century; extant verses 7, 12–13, 15, 17–20, 23).

=== Scholarly discussions ===
While there is no early manuscript or patristic evidence John circulated without chapter 21, some scholars argue that it was an addition by either the author of chapters 1-20 or a redactor, though an increasing number consider it part of the earliest text. Arguments in favour of the "later addition" hypothesis include:

- John 20:30–31 could have been 'the original ending of the gospel, which is repeated in an exaggerated version in John 21:25.' 20:30–31 summarizes the many signs which Jesus performed for his followers, not all of which could be recorded in the Gospel.
- The Restoration of Peter (John 21:3–19) emphasises the ecclesiastical leadership of Peter, which may indicate that this addition was intended to take a side in 'a later discussion on competing claims of apostolic authorities', especially in John 21:15–17, in which Jesus instructs Peter to 'Tend my sheep!', meaning to lead the flock (=lay people) as a pastor (literally 'shepherd').

Scholars opposing a later addition by another author have argued the following:

- No existing manuscript of the Gospel of John omits chapter 21. (Note: The Nestle-Aland Novum Testamentum Graece (27th ed.) as well as major translations of the New Testament (e.g. KJV, NASB, NIV, RSV, NRSV) retain chapter 21 in their editions as original.)
- No patristic commentator attests to a version of John without chapter 21. Lattke argued that Tertullian viewed chapter 20 as the end of the gospel, but Jackson notes allusions to chapter 21 elsewhere in his works and Tertullian's usage of clausula as a rhetorical term describing the end of a section or argument rather than the work.
- The part about the disciple whom Jesus loved (John 21:20–24) fits as a two-stage disclosure of the disciple's role as 'the authority of the special tradition of this gospel as the report of an eyewitness'. In particular, 21:24 shows a close resemblance to the earlier comment about the reliability of the eyewitness in John 19:35. Koester argues this assertion to be at odds with the Doubting Thomas story, though Mark Goodacre and Hugo Mendez note the claim to being a witness by the narrator in previous chapters is consistent with 21.
- Westcott proposed a theory that the author simply decided to add an additional incident at some time after writing the book, but before final publication. In this view, the redactor and the original author are the same person. Donald Guthrie commented: 'It is unlikely that another author wrote this section since there are several points of contact in it with the style and language of previous chapters.' Nicholas Elder also argues that the author of John 21 was connected to the author of John 1-20 and that authenticity is a separate issue from originality.
- Paul N. Anderson and Ben Witherington III argue that the appendix was added after the disciple whom Jesus loved had died, at which point the gospel reached its final form.

=== Manuscript evidence ===
In an essay contributed on behalf of scholars unconvinced of any decisive sense of "originality" to John 21 (published in 2007), Jesuit author Felix Just wrote: "We (unfortunately!) do not possess any ancient manuscript of John that actually ends at 20:31." In other words, ancient manuscripts that contain the end of John 20 also contain text from John 21. So if John 21 is an addition, it was so early (which is not in doubt: part of John 21 appears in P66) and so widespread, that no evidence of the prior form has survived.

Novum Testamentum Graece (NA28) and the United Bible Societies (UBS5) provide the critical text for John 21.

In 2006, following the discovery of a 4th-century Sahidic papyrus manuscript (Bodleian MS. Copt.e.150(P)) some scholars speculated that such text may end at 20:31, but this is not conclusive due to its fragmentary state. In 2018, Brent Nongbri claimed that P.Bodmer 2 (P66) was possible evidence for circulation without chapter 21 based on unused space, but Ryan Kaufman rebutted his argument based on an overlooked variant, and Nongbri acknowledged that Kaufman's solution was better.

== Contents ==
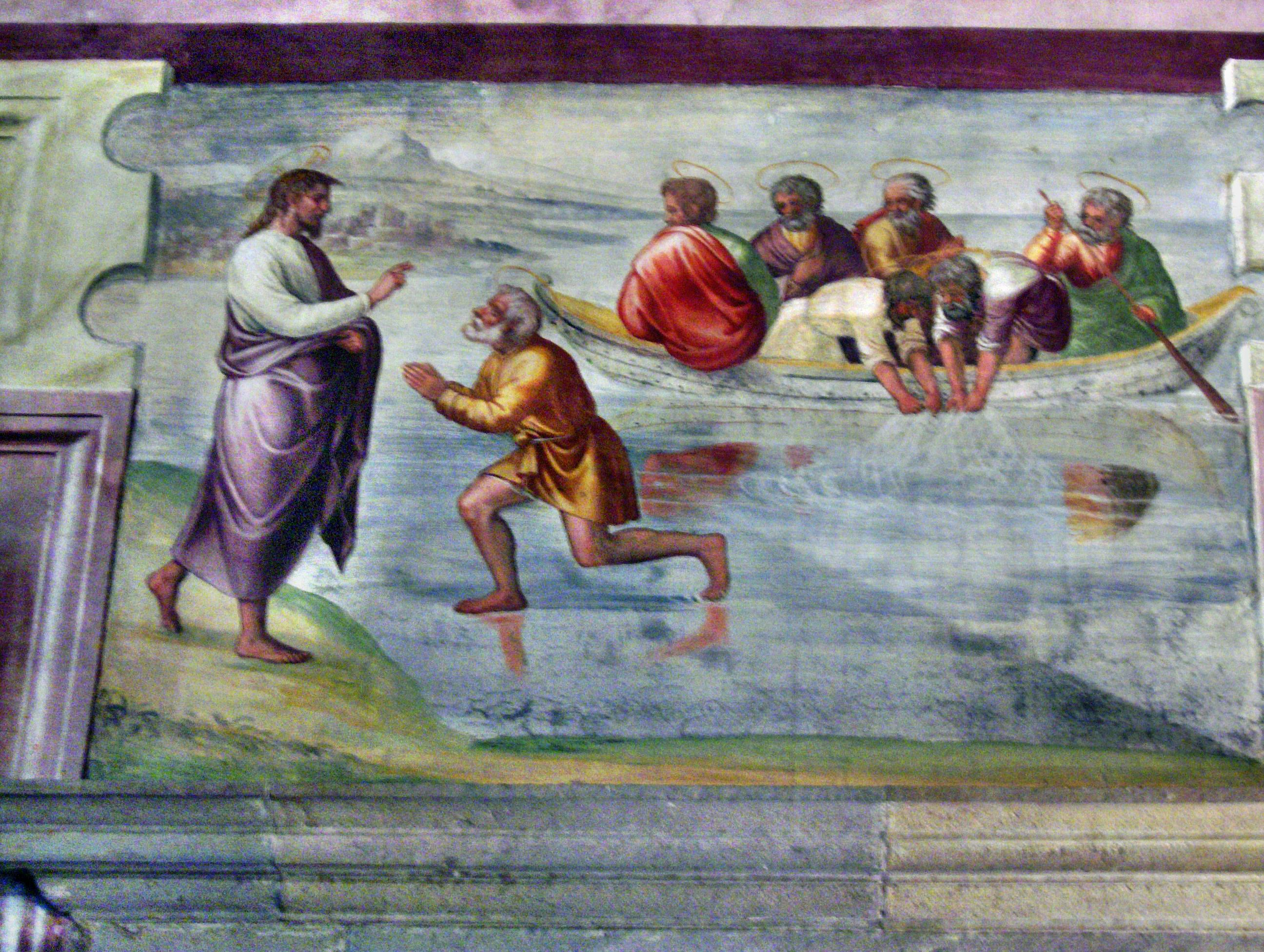
Miraculous catch of 153 fish fresco in the Spoleto Cathedral, Italy.

=== Breakfast by the Sea of Tiberias (verses 1–14) ===
==== Verses 1–2 ====
After these things, Jesus revealed himself again to the disciples at the sea of Tiberias. He revealed himself this way.

Simon Peter, Thomas called the Twin, Nathanael of Cana in Galilee, the sons of Zebedee, and two others of His disciples were together.

Of these seven disciples, the last two remain unnamed. Ernst Hengstenberg suggests they may have been Andrew and Philip, whereas Heinrich Meyer suggests they were non-apostolic disciples from the wider group of those who followed Jesus.

==== Verse 3 ====
Simon Peter said to them, "I am going fishing." They said to him, "We will go with you." They went out and got into the boat, but that night they caught nothing.

The King James Version adds "immediately" ([they] entered into a ship immediately). The additional word ευθυς (euthus) in the Textus Receptus and other editions runs contrary to manuscript testimony.

==== Verse 4 ====
But when the morning had now come, Jesus stood on the shore; yet the disciples did not know that it was Jesus.

The setting was in the "early morning", or at dawn. Alfred Plummer notes that a better translation is "Jesus came and stood on the beach.

==== Verse 5 ====
Then Jesus said to them, "Children, have you any food?" They answered Him, "No."

Several translations replace "children" with "friends" (e.g. the New Century Version and the New International Version). The Greek is παιδια (paidia): Verna Holyhead suggests that the intention is the same as Jesus' direction to "my children" (Greek: τεκνια, teknia), who "still have much to learn", in John 13:33.

==== Verse 11 ====
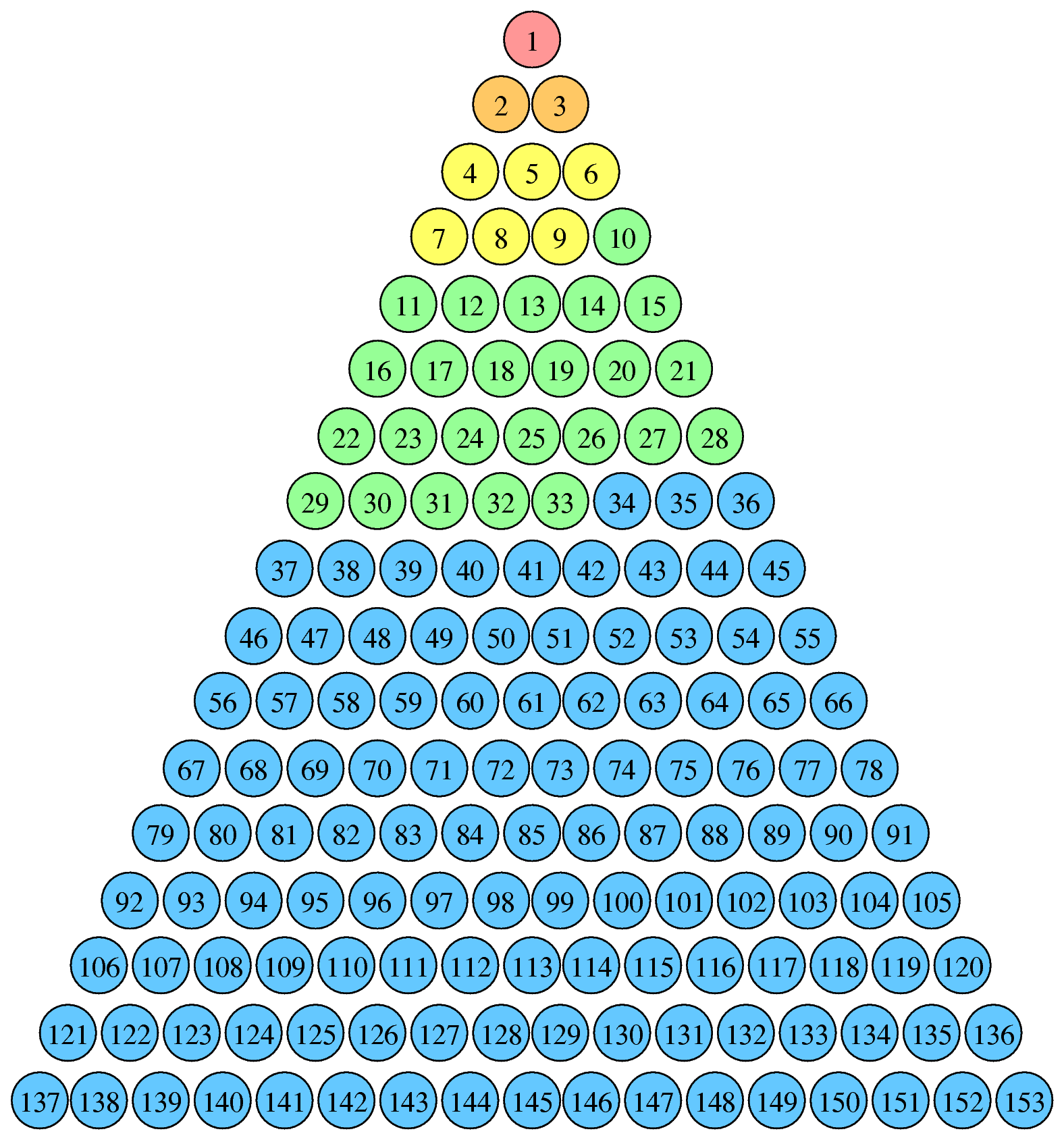
The number 153 is the sum of the first five positive factorials (shown in different colors).

So Simon Peter went aboard and hauled the net ashore, full of large fish, 153 of them. And although there were so many, the net was not torn.

Two points about the catch of fish are emphasized here:

1. there were 153 large fish in the net.
2. even with so many, the net was not torn.

Both are the kind of thing that would remain in the mind of a person who had witnessed them firsthand.

The number 153 is the 17th triangular number, as well as the sum of the first five positive factorials, and is associated with the geometric shape known as the Vesica Piscis (literally, "bladder of a fish") or Mandorla, which Archimedes, in his Measurement of a Circle, referred to in the ratio 153/265 as constituting the "measure of the fish", being an imperfect representation of 1/√3. Augustine of Hippo argued the significance of 153 being the sum of the first 17 integers is that 17 represents the combination of divine grace (the seven gifts of the Holy Spirit) and law (the Ten Commandments).

==== Verse 14 ====
This was now the third time that Jesus was revealed to the disciples after he was raised from the dead.

Irish Archbishop John McEvilly suggests the count is based on Jesus' appearances to his disciples "collectively".

=== Jesus restores Peter (verses 15–19) ===
Jesus restores Peter to fellowship after Peter had previously denied him, and tells Peter to feed Jesus' sheep. This restoration of Peter occurs in verses 21:15–19.

=== The disciple whom Jesus loved (verses 20–23) ===
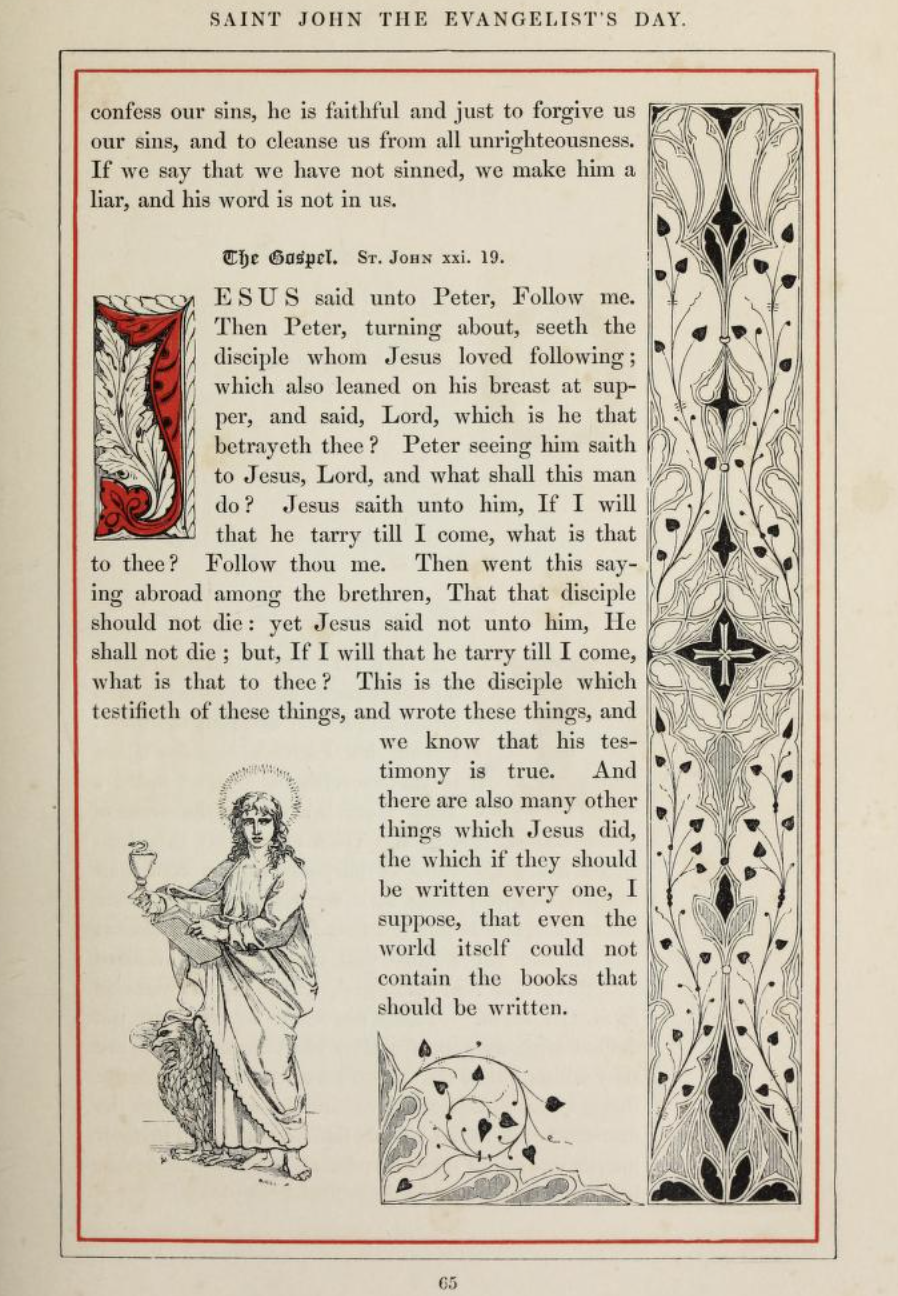
John 21:19–25 from the 1845 illustrated Book of Common Prayer

The description of the "beloved disciple's" (normally assumed to be John the Apostle) fate is presented as an aside to Peter. Jesus says that it is not Peter's concern, even if Jesus should wish that that disciple remain alive until the end of time. The following verse clarifies that Jesus did not say "This disciple will not die", but that it was not for Peter to know.

The last appearance of the 'disciple whom Jesus loved' in this Gospel, together with his first appearance in chapter 1 form a literary "inclusio of eyewitness testimony" to privilege this witness (in the Gospel of John 21:24) over Peter's, not to denigrate Peter's authority, but rather to claim a distinct qualification as an 'ideal witness' to Christ, because he survives Peter and bears his witness after Peter. Bauckham notes the occurrence of at least two specific words in the narratives of both the first and the last appearance of this disciple: "to follow" (Greek: ἀκολουθέω 'akoloutheó') and "to remain/stay" (Greek: μένω 'menó'). In the first chapter verse 1:38 it is stated that "Jesus turned, and seeing them following ('akolouthountas'), said to them, "What do you seek?"", then in verse 1:39 they "remained ('emeinan') with Him that day". In John 21, the last appearance of the 'Disciple whom Jesus loved' is indicated using similar words: in verse 21:20 it is written that "Peter, turning around, saw the disciple whom Jesus loved following ('akolouthounta')", then in verse 21:22 "Jesus said to him [Peter], "If I will that he remain ('menein') till I come, what is that to you?" The appearances are also close to Peter's, as the first one, along with Andrew, happened just before Peter's, who was then given the name 'Cephas' (alluding to Peter's role after Jesus' departure), and the last one, just after Jesus' dialogue with Peter, acknowledging the significance of Peter's testimony within "the Petrine's inclusio", which is also found in the Gospel of Mark and Luke (see Luke 8 under "The Women who sustained Jesus").

=== Conclusion (verses 24–25) ===
The chapter and the whole book are closed by two verses referring to the author of the gospel in the third person ("We know that his testimony is true"):

==== Verse 24 ====
This is the disciple who is bearing witness about these things, and who has written these things, and we know that his testimony is true.

==== Verse 25 ====
And there are also many other things that Jesus did, which if they were written one by one, I suppose that even the world itself could not contain the books that would be written. Amen.

The majority of scholars believe the verses claim the beloved disciple was the author of the gospel, though others such as Tom Thatcher argue the author is claiming to be recording the disciple's testimony as an amanuensis or using an earlier source while rejecting reconstructions that place the author multiple stages away from the disciple. Like the Beloved Disciple as implied author of John, ancient historians and biographers such as Xenophon and Josephus also alternated between first- and third-person references in their works. For instance, in the History of the Peloponnesian War, Thucydides utilized both third-person self-references ("Thucydides, the Athenian, wrote the history of the war") and both first-person singular ("I") and plural ("we") self-references.

== See also ==
- 153 (number)
- Overview of resurrection appearances in the Gospels and Paul
- Pericope Adulterae
- Related Bible parts: Mark 16, Luke 24, John 1

== Notes ==
Preceded by John 20	Chapters of the Bible; Gospel of John	Succeeded by Acts of the Apostles 1
