= P122 =

P122 may refer to

- Brazilian corvette Araguari
- Papyrus 122, a biblical manuscript
- TCG Beykoz (P-122), a patrol boat of the Turkish Navy
- P122, a state regional road in Latvia
