= Overview of resurrection appearances in the Gospels and Paul =

Comparison of post-resurrection appearances of Jesus

The Gospels, Acts and Paul describe several resurrection appearances of Jesus. An overview is given below.

Paul (c. 53–54)	Mark 16:1-8 (66–70)	Matthew (70-110)	Luke (80–110)	Acts (80-90)	John (90–110)	Mark; Longer ending (c. 2nd-4th cent.)	Mark; Shorter ending (c. 3rd cent.)
Women at the tomb
	Mary Magdalene, Mary the mother of James, and Salome go to the tomb, where the stone has been rolled away.	Mary Magdalene and "the other Mary" go to the tomb.	"The women who had come with him from Galilee" find the stone rolled away and the tomb empty.		Mary Magdalene goes to the tomb and finds the stone removed.		
					Mary Magdalene informs Peter and the beloved disciple, who go to the tomb.		
Appearance of angels at the tomb
	They see, sitting inside the tomb when they enter, "a young man, dressed in a white robe," who says that "He has been raised; he is not here."	An angel appears who rolls back the stone and sits on it outside the tomb, telling them that "He is not here; for he has been raised, as he said."	Two men "in dazzling clothes" suddenly appear while they are in the tomb, saying that "He is not here, but has risen."		Appearance of two angels to Mary Magdalene.		
	Instruction to them to tell "his disciples and Peter" to go to Galilee where they will see Jesus.	Instruction to Mary to tell "his disciples" to go to Galilee to meet Jesus.					
	[Verse 8] "So they went out and fled from the tomb, for terror and amazement had seized them; and they said nothing to anyone, for they were afraid."		"Mary Magdalene, Joanna, Mary the mother of James, and the other women with them" tell the apostles what happened, but are not believed. Peter goes to the tomb, sees the linen cloths, and is "amazed."				[Unversed] "And all that had been commanded them they told briefly to those around Peter."
First appearance of Jesus
		Jesus appears to Mary Magdalene and the "other Mary"			Jesus appears to Mary Magdalene, who informs the disciples	[Verse 9] Jesus appears to Mary Magdalene. She tells "those who had been with him," but they don't believe her story.	
			Jesus appears to two disciples			Jesus appears to two disciples	
Appearance of Jesus to the other disciples
"[H]e appeared to Cephas, then to the twelve. Then he appeared to more than five hundred brothers and sisters at one time, most of whom are still alive, though some have died. Then he appeared to James, then to all the apostles."			Jesus appears to eleven disciples and others in Jerusalem; Great Commission; command to stay in Jerusalem	Jesus appears to apostles for forty days	Jesus appears twice to the disciples in Jerusalem.	Jesus appears to eleven disciples (unspecified location); Great Commission	[Unversed - shorter ending] "And afterward Jesus himself sent out through them, from east to west, the sacred and imperishable proclamation of eternal salvation."
"[H]e appeared to Cephas, then to the twelve. Then he appeared to more than five hundred brothers and sisters at one time, most of whom are still alive, though some have died. Then he appeared to James, then to all the apostles."		Jesus appears to eleven disciples in Galilee; Great Commission		Jesus appears to apostles for forty days	Jesus appears again in Galilee, to Peter, Thomas, and five other disciples, commanding Peter to take care of his sheep	Jesus appears to eleven disciples (unspecified location); Great Commission	[Unversed - shorter ending] "And afterward Jesus himself sent out through them, from east to west, the sacred and imperishable proclamation of eternal salvation."
				Jesus orders the apostles to stay in Jerusalem, promising to baptize them with the Holy Spirit			
Ascension of Jesus
			Jesus is taken up into heaven	Jesus is taken up into heaven		Jesus is taken up into heaven	
"Last of all, as to one untimely born, he appeared also to me."							

Timothy McGrew and Lydia McGrew argue in the field of philosophy of religion that the testimony of the disciples to group appearances of the risen Jesus produces a very large cumulative Bayes factor strongly supporting the reality of the resurrection over purely naturalistic explanations.

== See also ==
- Empty tomb
- Resurrection of Jesus
- Noli me tangere
- Road to Emmaus appearance
- Miraculous catch of fish
- Restoration of Peter
- Great Commission
- Resurrection of Jesus in Christian art
