= P109 =

P109 may refer to:

- ARM Manuel Gutiérrez Zamora (P109), a patrol boat of the Mexican Navy
- Papyrus 109, a biblical manuscript
- P109, a state regional road in Latvia
