= Papyrus 109 =

- New Testament manuscript
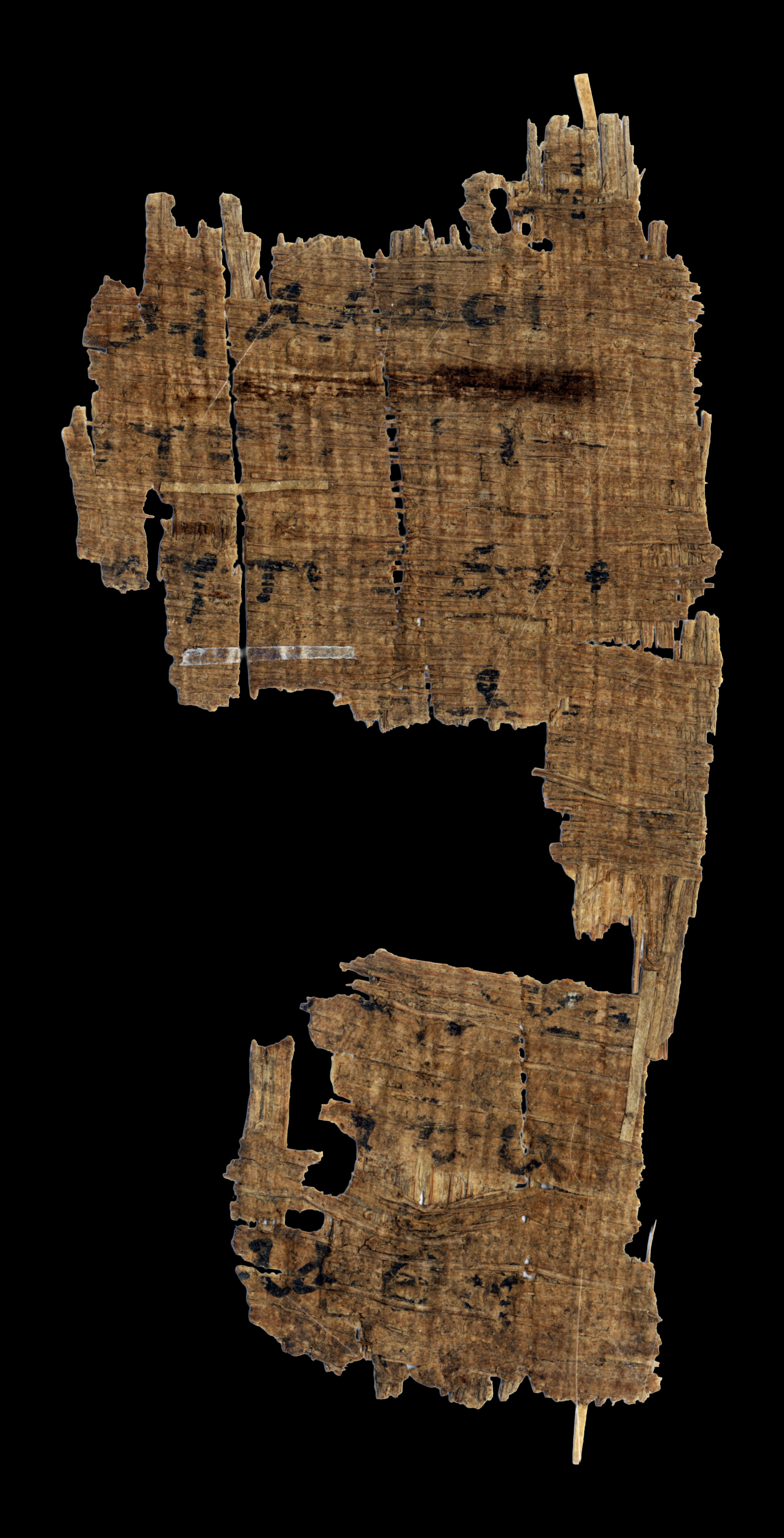
- Recto, John 21:18-20
- Name: P. Oxy. 4448
- Sign: 𝔓^{109}
- Text: Gospel of John 21:18-20, 23-25
- Date: 3rd century
- Script: Greek
- Found: Oxyrhynchus, Egypt
- Now at: Sackler Library
- Cite: W. E. H. Cockle, OP LXV (1998), pp. 19-20
- Size: 7.9 x 4.1 cm
- Type: unknown
- Category: ?

Papyrus 109 is an early copy of the New Testament in Greek. It is a papyrus manuscript of the Gospel of John, containing verses 21:18-20 & 21:23-25 in a fragmentary condition. It is designated by the siglum 𝔓^{109} in the Gregory-Aland numbering of New Testament manuscripts. Using the study of comparative writing styles (palaeography), it has been assigned by the INTF to the early 3rd century CE. Papyrologist Philip Comfort dates the manuscript to the middle-late 2nd century CE. The manuscript is currently housed at the Papyrology Rooms (P. Oxy. 4448) of the Sackler Library at Oxford.

== Description ==
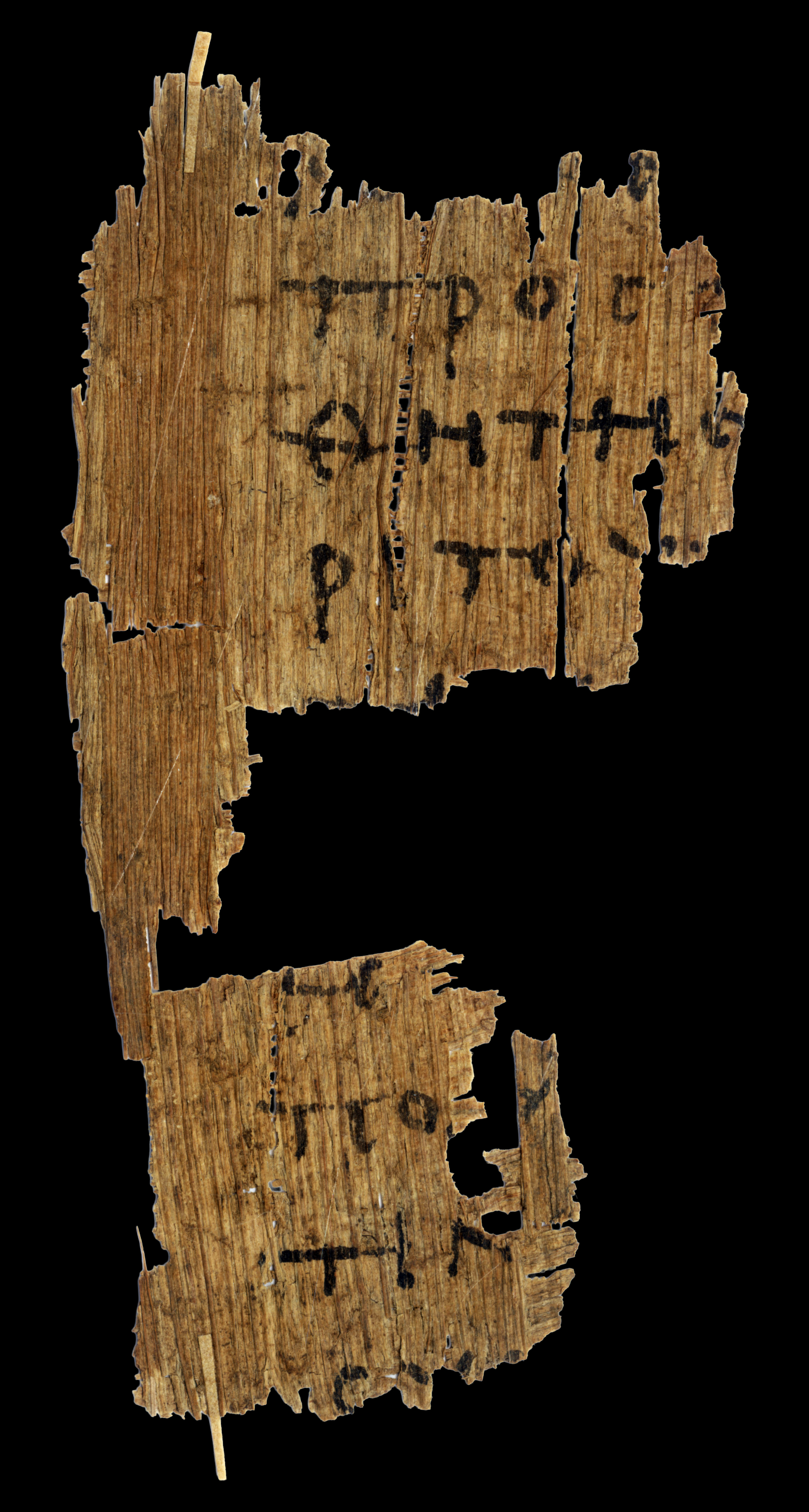
Verso, John 21:23-25

The original manuscript probably measured 12 cm x 24 cm, with 26 lines per page. The handwriting script is representative of the Reformed Documentary style. The text is too small to determine its textual character.

Some notable readings

Below taken from the Nestle-Aland 27th Edition Apparatus.

John 21:18 (1)

αλλοι : 𝔓^{109} 𝔓^{59} א C^{2} D W 1 33 565 pc sy^{h(mg)} pbo,
αλλος : A Θ Ψ ƒ^{13} $\mathfrak{M}$ lat

John 21:18 (2)

αποισουσιν σε : 𝔓^{109} 𝔓^{59} א^{2} D W 1 33 565 pc sy^{h(mg)} pbo,
οισει : A B C*^{(vid)} Θ Ψ ƒ^{13} $\mathfrak{M}$ lat sy^{s}^{, p}^{, h}
ποιησουσιν σοι οσα: א*
επογουσιν σε : D*
απαγουσιν σε : D^{1}
οισουσιν σε : C^{2}

John 21:23

τι προς σε

incl. : 𝔓^{109} א^{1} A B C^{*vid} W Θ Ψ ƒ^{13} $\mathfrak{M}$ lat sy^{p}^{, h}
omit. : א* C^{2vid} 1 565 pc a e sy^{s}

John 21:25

ουδ : 𝔓^{109} א^{1} B D W Θ Ψ ƒ^{13} $\mathfrak{M}$
ουδε : A C

== Transcription ==
John 21:18-20. 23-25

^{18} [λες οταν δε γηρασης εκτε]ν̣ε̣ι[ς
τας χειρας σου κ]αι αλλοι

[αποι]ο̣υσιν̣ σ̣ε̣

[οπου ου θελεις ^{19} τ]ουτο̣ δ̣ε
[ειπεν σημαινων ποιω] θ̣α̣
[νατω δοξασει τον θν και]
[τουτο ειπων λεγει αυ]τ̣ω̣ ακο
[λουθει μοι ^{20} επιστραφ]ε̣ι̣ς̣ ο̣
[πετρος βλεπει τον] μ̣αθ̣η̣

^{23} μ[ε]νε̣[ιν εως ερχομαι τι]
προς σ̣[ε ^{24} ουτος εστιν ο μα]
θητης [ο και μαρτυρων πε]
ρι τουτ̣[ων και ο γραψας]
τ̣α̣υ̣[τα και οιδαμεν οτι]
[αληθης αυτου η μαρτυρια]
ε̣σ[τιν ^{25} εστιν δε και αλλα]
πολ̣λ̣[α α εποιησεν ο ιης̅ α]
τινα̣ [εαν γραφηται καθ εν]
ο̣υ̣δ̣ [αυτον οιμαι τον κοσμον]

== See also ==
- List of New Testament papyri
- Oxyrhynchus Papyri
- Gospel of John: chapter 21
