= Restoration of Peter =

Gospel episode

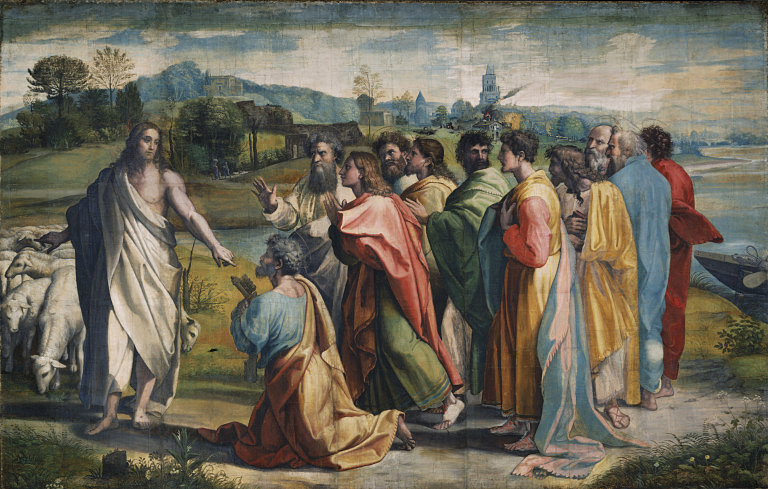
Raphael, Christ's Charge to Peter, 1515.

The Restoration of Peter (also known as the Re-commissioning of Peter) is an incident described in John 21 of the New Testament in which Jesus appeared to his disciples after his resurrection and spoke to Peter in particular. Jesus restored Peter to fellowship after Peter had previously denied him and told Peter to feed Jesus' sheep.

== Background ==
=== Jesus' resurrection ===
According to the New Testament, Jesus rose from the dead and appeared to his disciples. The Gospel of John records a number of such appearances. This episode is thus part of the fourth resurrection appearance in John's gospel.

1 Corinthians 15:5 suggests that Jesus had already appeared individually to Peter; A. B. Bruce argues on this basis that the account in John 21 is not really a "restoration" since Peter would have been restored already: "Who can doubt that after that meeting the disciple's mind was at ease, and that thereafter he was at peace, both with himself and with his Master?" Bruce concludes that the account is not "the restoration of Peter to a forfeited position, but his recall to a more solemn sense of high vocation."

=== Peter's denial ===
All four gospels record Peter's denial of Jesus, and all of the synoptic gospels record how Peter "wept bitterly" after the rooster crowed. John omits this detail, but he is unique in describing the restoration scene between Jesus and Peter. Jesus words in Mark 16:7, however, are often thought to carry the message of Peter's restoration: "But go, tell his disciples and Peter, ‘He is going ahead of you into Galilee...’" (NIV).

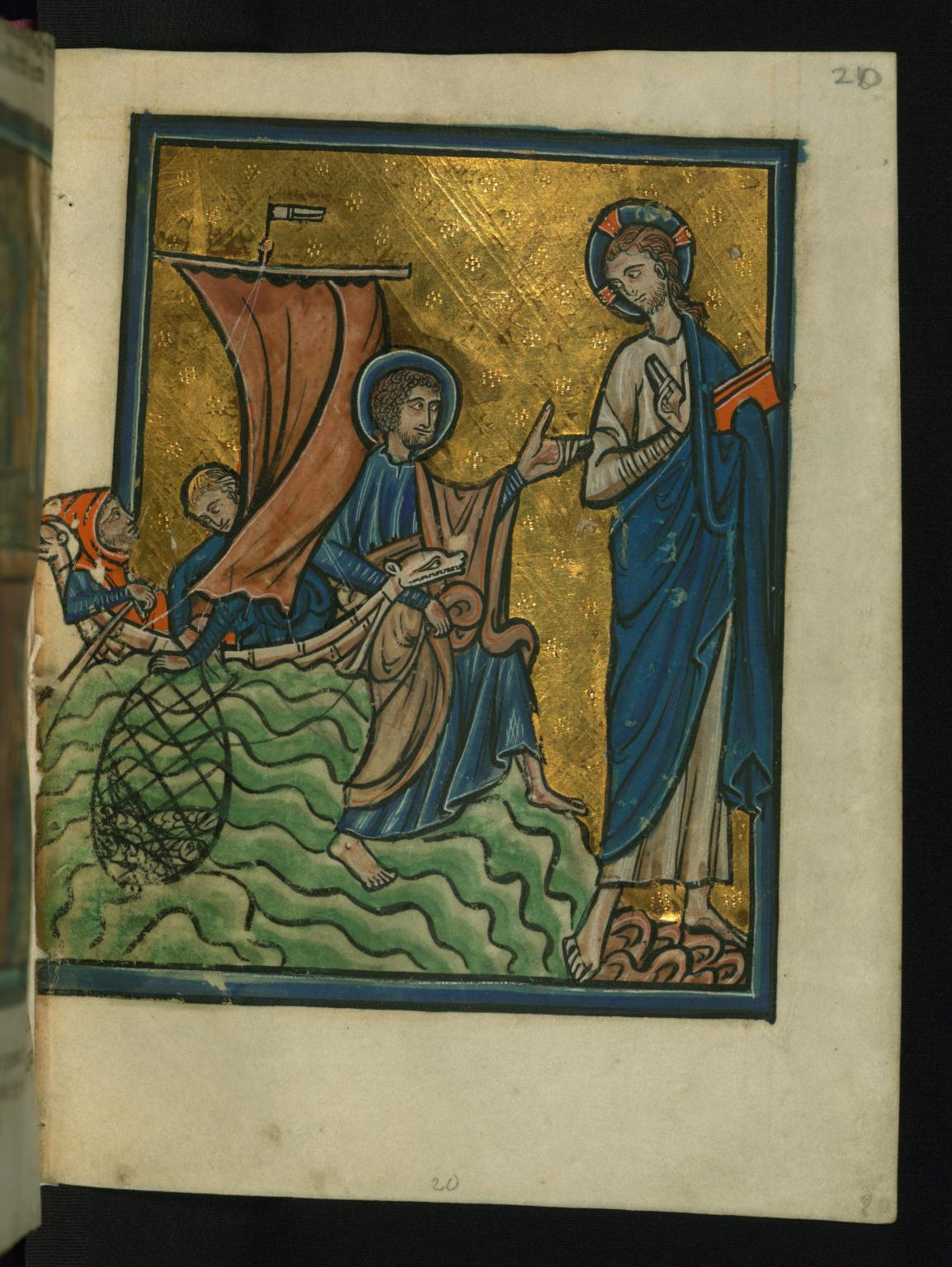
William de Brailes, Christ Appears at Lake Tiberias, c. 1250.

Paul Barnett notes that Jesus' approach to Peter in John 21 is "both forgiving and stern."

=== Meeting by the sea ===
In John 21, Peter goes fishing with six other disciples. They do not catch any fish all night, but in the morning Jesus meets them and tells them to throw their net on the other side of the boat. When they do, there is a miraculous catch of 153 fish.

Jesus and his disciples have breakfast on the shore. Jesus prepares the breakfast of bread and fish, including a charcoal fire. Peter also stood near a charcoal fire when he denied Jesus. After they finish eating, Jesus speaks particularly to Peter.

== Jesus' threefold charge to Peter ==
=== Comparison with Peter's denial ===
Earlier Peter had denied Jesus three times. Now, in response to Jesus' questioning, Peter affirms his love for Jesus three times. William Hendriksen notes some other correspondences between this episode and that of Peter's denial. For example, it is at a charcoal (ἀνθρακιὰν) fire where Peter first denied Jesus (John 18:18) and now is asked to confess his love for his master (John 21:9). Ben Witherington III suggests that "John has the threefold restoration take place in a setting similar to where the threefold denial did. It's like revisiting the scene of the crime, only this time getting it right."

=== "Do you love me more than these?" ===
Jesus asks Peter, "Do you love me more than these?" The Greek text is ambiguous as to what the "these" refers to, and D. A. Carson notes that there are three possibilities:

1. Do you love me more than you love these disciples?
2. Do you love me more than you love this fishing gear?
3. Do you love me more than these other disciples do?

Carson himself chooses the third option. Adrienne von Speyr argues, "The Lord expects that Peter should love him more than the others do, more than John, who is nevertheless love personified. And he should also have personal knowledge of this more. This expectation constitutes an immediate overtaxing of Peter, an overtaxing that begins here and will reach no end until the end of time. ... More than these also means: more than these who have previously known only personal love."

=== Two words used for "love" ===
The dialogue between Jesus and Peter contains two different words for "love", which some, but not all, commentators deem to be of exegetical significance. The words are agapaô (the verb form of the noun agape) and phileô (the verb form of the noun philia). The dialogue proceeds as follows:

- Jesus asked, "do you agapâis me?"
- Peter replied, "I phileô you."
- Jesus asked, "do you agapâis me?"
- Peter replied, "I phileô you."
- Jesus asked, "do you phileis me?"
- Peter replied, "I phileô you."

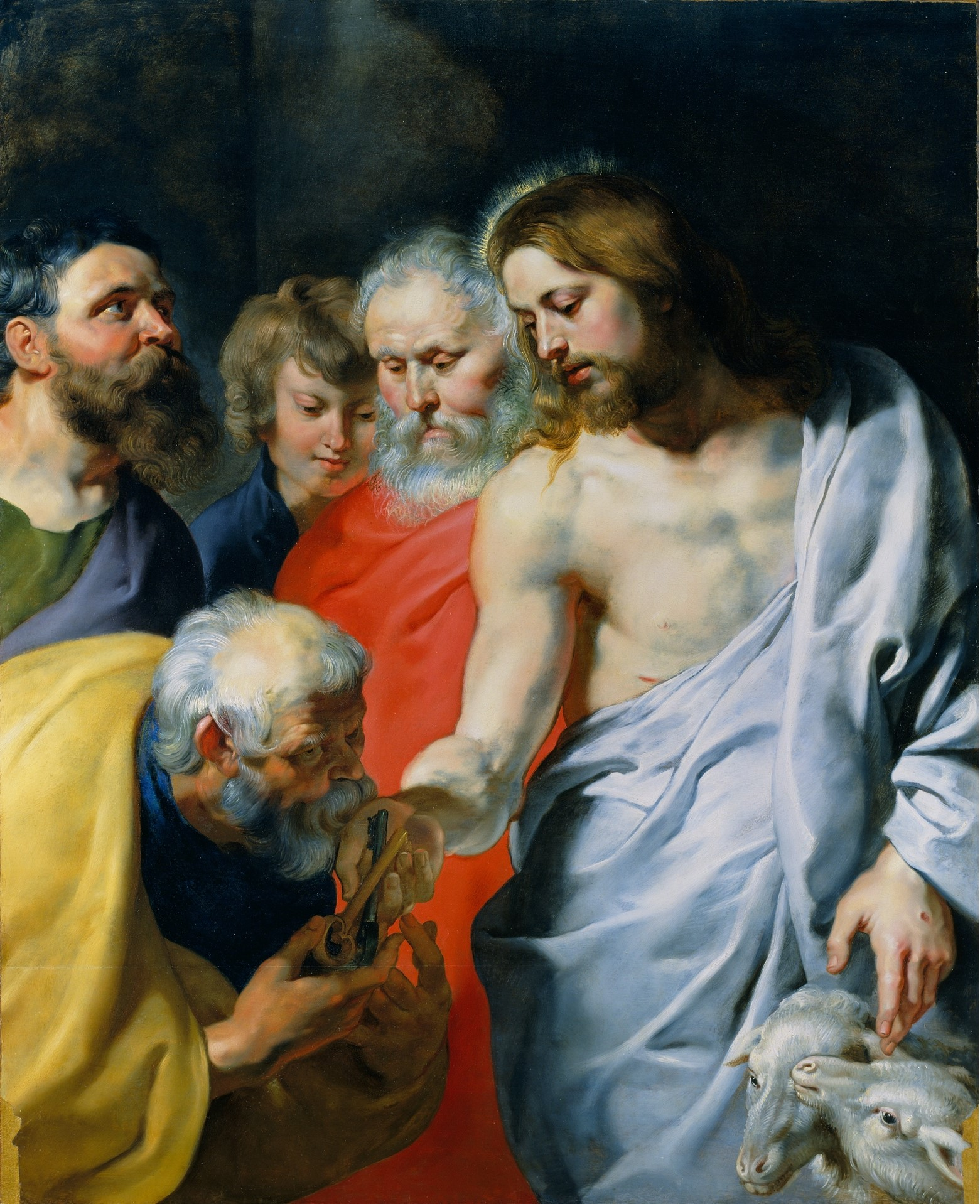
Peter Paul Rubens, Christ's Charge to Peter, c. 1616

This is brought out in the 1984 (but not the 2011) edition of the NIV, which renders agapao as "truly love" and phileo as "love". Ben Witherington III suggests that this indicates "Jesus' gracious condescension to the level that Peter was prepared to respond at this juncture." William Hendriksen argues that in his third question, Jesus is calling into question even Peter's "subjective attachment" and affection, and that is why it says "Peter was grieved because he said to him this third time..." (John 21:17).

Other commentators, such as Carson, reject the idea of a distinction between the meaning of the two words. According to Thomas J. Lane, "Since the early centuries, it has been debated whether there is significance to Peter responding with a different love verb and for the third question Jesus using the same love verb as Peter. While the majority opinion has swayed to and fro over the centuries, the common opinion now is that, since these two love verbs are used interchangeably in this Gospel, there is no special significance to their use here in [John] 21:15-17. Keener has done a study of their interchangeability in John, showing that they are both used even to describe the Father loving Jesus."

In his The Lord, Romano Guardini says that Jesus' second and third questions made Peter nevermore answer him with his "old confidence", made him more humble and realized that he was being punished for "his triple treason".

=== Peter appointed as shepherd ===
In response to Peter's three affirmations of love for him, Jesus gives Peter three commands: "Feed my lambs" / "Take care of my sheep" / "Feed my sheep". Jesus is re-commissioning Peter as an apostle and leader in the church. "Sheep" is a common metaphor in the New Testament to refer to the people of God. This is the origin of the word "pastor", which means "shepherd".

The 1913 Catholic Encyclopedia argues that the title "Vicar of Christ", given to the Pope, is founded on these words of Jesus, "by which He constituted the Prince of the Apostles guardian of His entire flock in His own place, thus making him His Vicar and fulfilling the promise made in Matthew 16:18–19." Protestant theologians such as D. A. Carson argues that "neither founding pre-eminence nor comparative authority is in view" in this passage. Writing from an Orthodox perspective, Victor Potapov argues that the word "feed" does not signify "the supreme authority of pastorship," but simply "the authority and responsibilities of pastorship proper to all the apostles and their successors."

== Jesus' prediction of Peter's death ==
Jesus then describes Peter's future to him, and says "someone else will dress you and lead you where you do not want to go" (John 21:18, NIV). The narrator interprets this as referring to Peter's martyrdom (John 21:19). According to a tradition found in the apocryphal Acts of Peter, Peter was crucified upside-down.

Another possibility is argued for by classicist Timothy Barnes. He suggests that if the author of John knew the rough details of Peter's death, these verses actually imply that Peter was not crucified, but rather burned alive. According to the historian Tacitus, Nero ordered the Christians he accused of being behind the Great Fire of Rome to be burned alive as a sort of poetic justice. Criminals were generally crucified naked (despite later art often depicting Jesus allowed a loincloth for modesty), a poor fit for being "dressed" by another, while burning someone alive may have involved placing an oil-soaked tunic on them, suggesting that the verse may have been a reference to just such a vestment.

== "Follow me" ==
After having said all the above, Jesus said to Peter, "Follow me" (John 21:19). Guardini argues, "Here too an event from the past is recalled, transfigured, and continued." At the moment Peter became happy again since he realized that he has been forgiven, and then he resumed "something of his old garrulousness".
