= Miraculous catch of fish =

Two miracles of Jesus

Two miracles

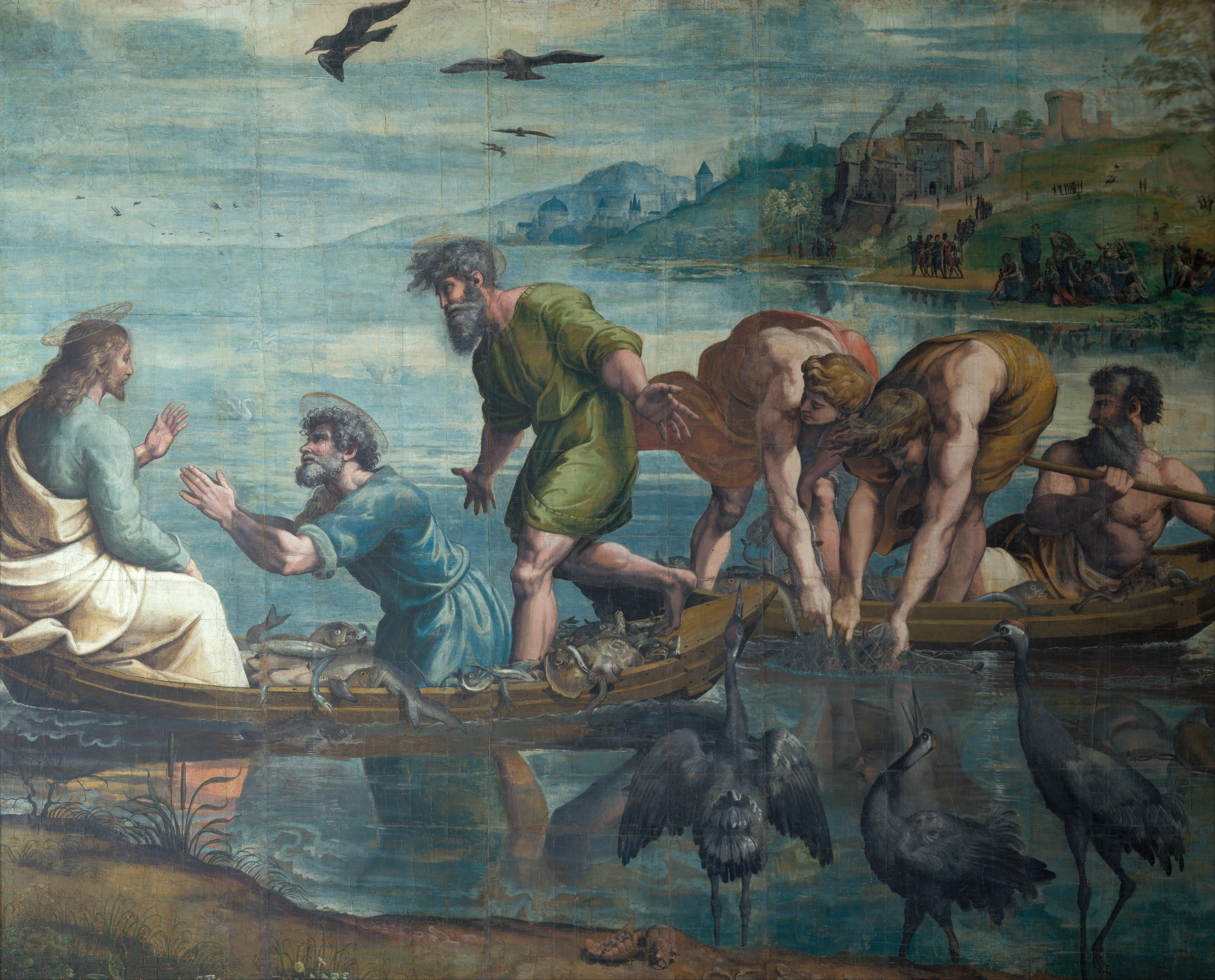
Raphael (1515)

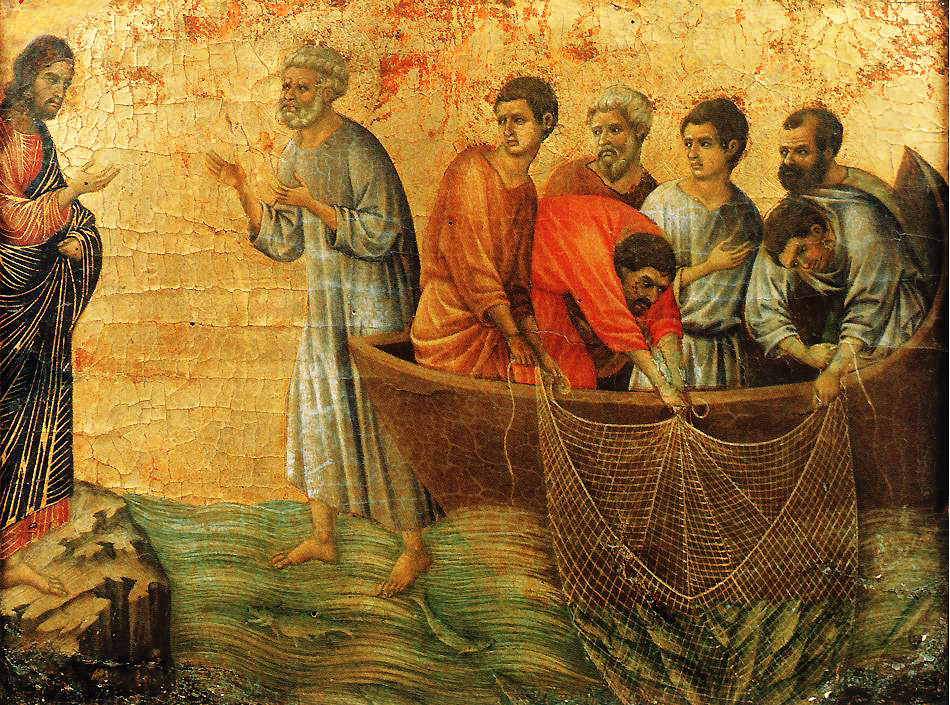
Duccio (14th century)

The painting by Raphael (top) showing Jesus in the boat depicts the first miracle. The painting by Duccio (bottom) showing Jesus on the shore depicts the second miracle.

The miraculous catch of fish, or more traditionally the miraculous draught of fish(es), is either of two events commonly (but not universally) considered to be miracles in the canonical gospels. The miracles are reported as taking place years apart from each other, but in both miracles apostles are fishing unsuccessfully in the Sea of Galilee when Jesus tells them to try one more cast of the net, at which they are rewarded with a great catch (or "draught", as in "haul" or "weight"). Either is thus sometimes called a "miraculous draught of fish".

== Overview ==
In the Gospel of Luke (Luke 5:1–11), the first miraculous catch of fish takes place early in the ministry of Jesus and results in Peter as well as James and John, the sons of Zebedee, joining Jesus vocationally as disciples.

The second miraculous catch of fish is also called the "miraculous catch of 153 fish", and seems to recall the first catch. It is reported in the last chapter of the Gospel of John (John 21:1–14) and takes place after the Resurrection of Jesus.

In Christian art, the two miracles are distinguished by the fact that in the first miracle Jesus is shown sitting in the boat with Peter, while in the second miracle he is standing on the shore.

== First miraculous catch of fish ==
According to the Gospel of Luke, on the day of this miracle, Jesus was preaching near the Lake of Genesareth (Sea of Galilee), when he saw two boats at the water's edge. Boarding the one belonging to Simon (Peter), and moving out a little from shore, he sat and taught the people from the boat. Afterwards, he said to Peter:

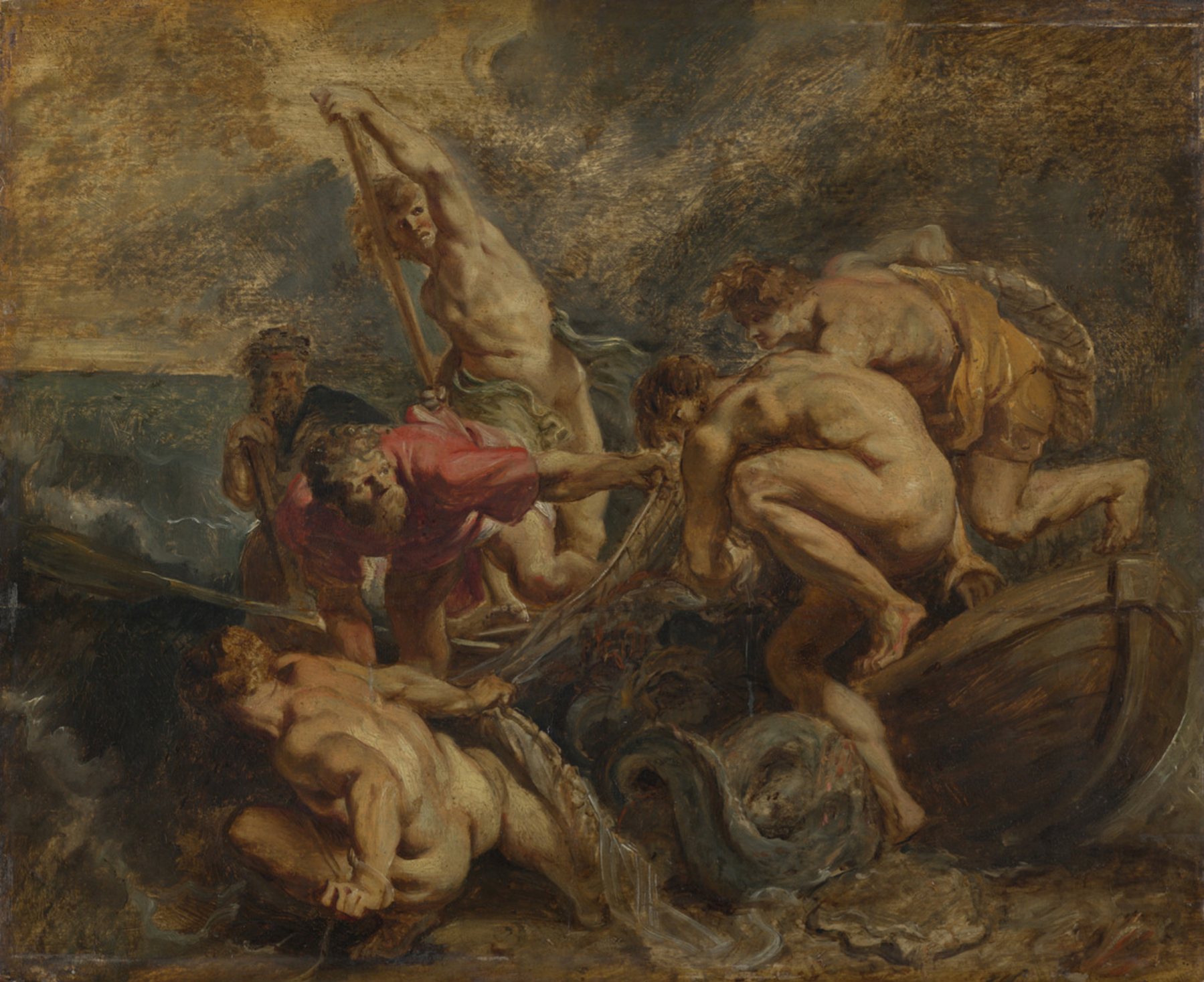
Miraculous draught of fish (1610) oil on wood by Peter Paul Rubens

Put out into deep water, and let down the nets for a catch.

Peter answered:

Master, we've worked hard all night and haven't caught anything. But because you say so, I will let down the nets.

When they had done so, "they caught such a large number of fish that their nets began to break", requiring help from another boat. When Peter saw the large catch, which filled both boats almost to sinking point, he fell at Jesus' knees and said, "Go away from me, Lord; I am a sinful man!" Jesus responded "Don't be afraid; from now on you will catch men", after which Peter and his partners James and John left everything and followed Jesus.

== Second miraculous catch of fish—153 large ones ==
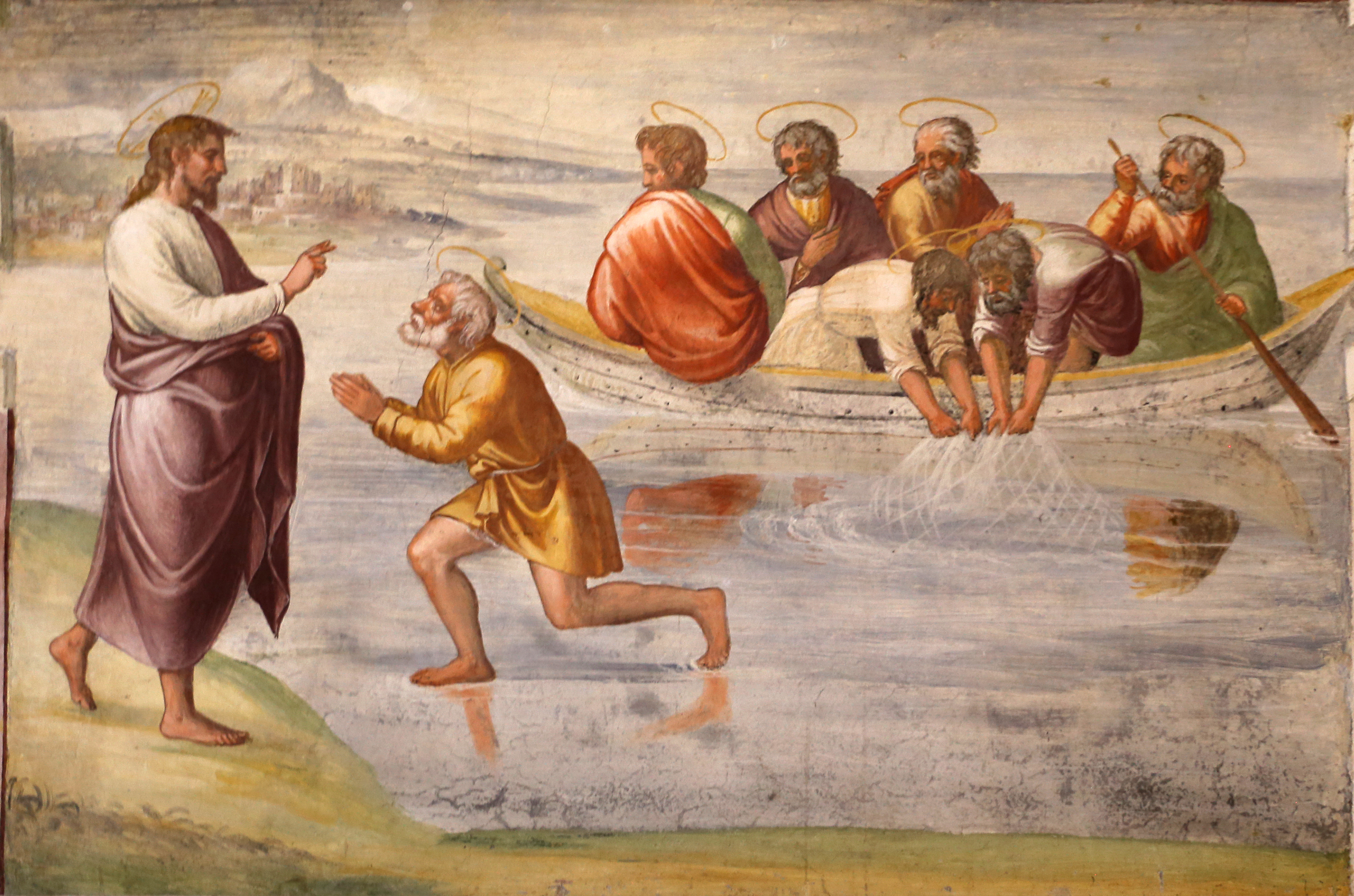
Miraculous catch of 153 fish fresco in the Spoleto Cathedral, Italy (second miracle)

According to John 21:11

Simon Peter went up, and drew the net to land full of great fishes, an hundred and fifty and three: and for all there were so many, yet was not the net broken.

This has become known popularly as the "153 fish" miracle. In the Gospel of John, seven of the disciples—Peter, Thomas, Nathanael, the sons of Zebedee (James and John), and two others—decided to go fishing one evening after the Resurrection of Jesus, but caught nothing that night. Early the next morning, Jesus (whom they had not recognized) called out to them from the shore:

Children, have ye any meat?

When they reply in the negative (the question in Greek uses a particle which expects the answer "No"), Jesus responds: "Cast the net on the right side of the ship, and ye shall find". After doing so, "now they were not able to draw it for the multitude of fishes".

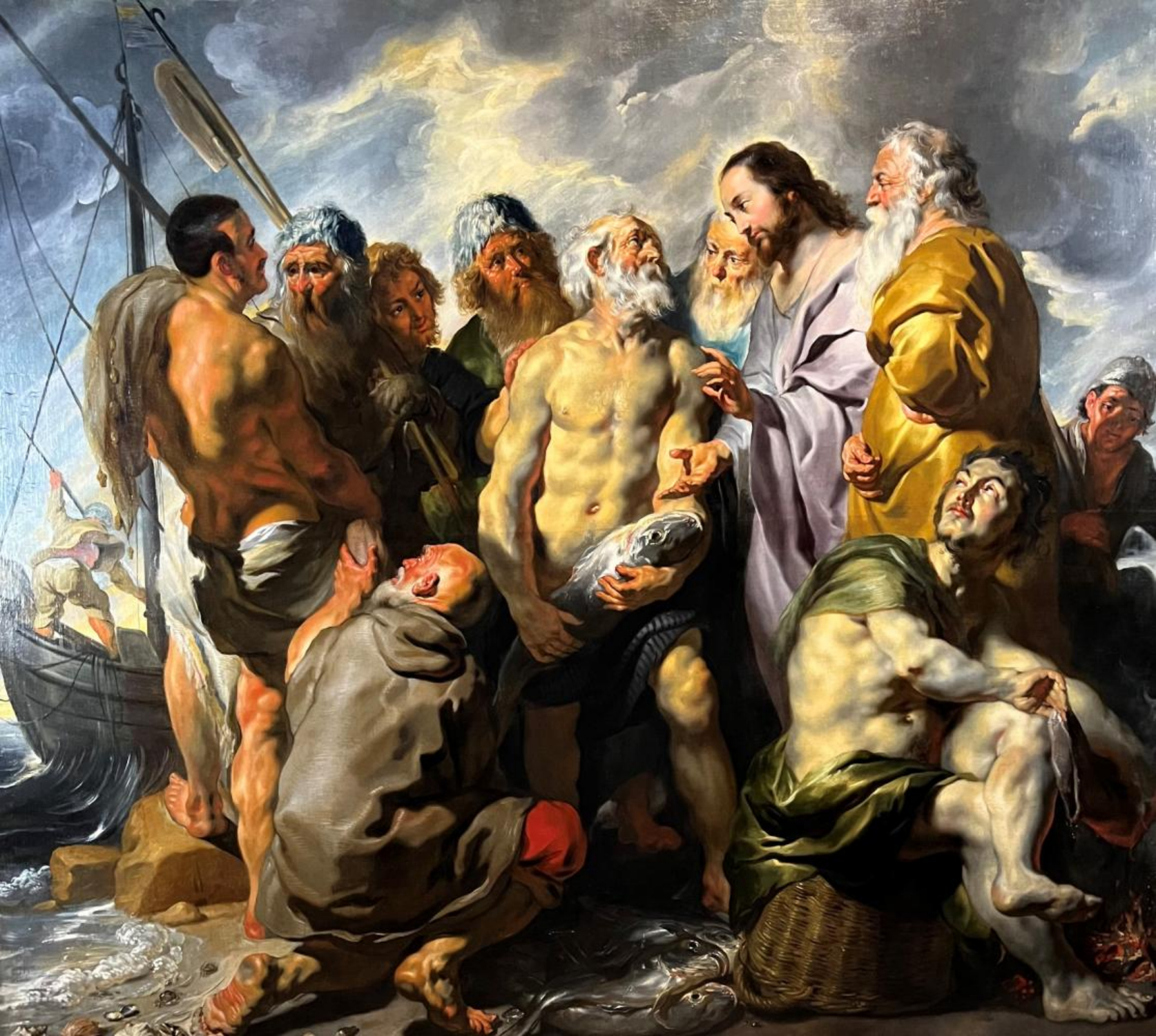
Miraculous Catch of Fish by Jacob Jordaens, c. 1616 (second miracle)

Realizing the identity of their advisor, the disciple whom Jesus loved said to Peter, "It is the Lord!" at which Peter jumped into the water to meet him (an aspect of the story often illustrated in Christian art), while the remaining disciples followed in the boat, towing the net, which proved to be full of 153 large fish. The fish caught were later used by Jesus to cook some breakfast along with some bread for himself and for his disciples.

This passage has traditionally been one of the liturgical readings following Easter, and sermons have been preached on it by Augustine of Hippo and John Chrysostom, among others.

=== 153 fish ===
The precision of the number of fish as 153 has long been considered, and various writers have argued that the number 153 has some deeper significance, with many conflicting theories having been offered (see the discussion on the number 153 in the Bible). For instance, Augustine of Hippo argued that the significance lay in the fact that 153 is the sum of the first 17 integers (i.e. 153 is the 17th triangular number), with 17 representing the combination of divine grace (the seven gifts of the Holy Spirit) and law (the Ten Commandments).

Cornelius a Lapide summarized the views of others in his commentary, including the following: Jerome wrote "Those who have written about animated nature say that there are a hundred and fifty-three kinds of fish. One of each of these kinds was caught by the Apostle, and more remained uncaught. For noble and ignoble, rich and poor, all sorts and conditions of men, are drawn out of the sea of this world to salvation." Cyril said the number one hundred signified the fulness of the Gentiles which was about to enter into the net of Peter and the Church; the fifty signifies the smaller number of the Jews, who would be saved; the three represents the mystery of the Blessed Trinity, by the faith and worship of Whom both Jews and Gentiles are gathered together and saved. Both Rupertus and Maldonatus explain that the hundred denotes those who are married, the most numerous; the fifty denotes the widows and continent, fewer in number, and the three denotes virgins, the fewest of all.

Discussing some of these theories, theologian D. A. Carson suggests that "If the Evangelist has some symbolism in mind connected with the number 153, he has hidden it well", while other scholars note "No symbolic significance for the number of 153 fish in John 21:11 has received widespread support".

References to aspects of the miracle, or to the general idea of being "fishers of men", can sometimes be recognised by uses of the number 153. For example, St Paul's School in London was founded in 1512 by John Colet to teach 153 poor men's children: although the school is now considerably larger, it still has 153 Foundation Scholars, who since the 19th century have worn a fish emblem on their watch-chains, or, more recently, in their button-holes.

2 Chronicles 2:17 records Solomon as having conducted a census of foreigners: "And Solomon numbered all the strangers that were in the land of Israel, after the numbering wherewith David his father had numbered them; and they were found an hundred and fifty thousand and three thousand and six hundred."

== Interpretations ==
=== Friedrich Justus Knecht: a parable of the Church ===
The Catholic German theologian Friedrich Justus Knecht (d. 1921) wrote that,

The object of this miracle which Jesus worked solely for Peter and the other disciples was twofold: 1. Like all the other miracles it was meant to increase and confirm the faith of the disciples; 2. it was meant to prepare the disciples, and especially St. Peter, for the apostolic office, which was typified by this miracle. Through it Jesus meant to say to His disciples: "Even as just now you put out to sea and cast in your nets, at my bidding, and captured this extraordinary draught, so in the future shall you fish for the souls of men in the sea of this world; and you will have as great a success in that office as you have had just now with your nets, and will bring thousands of souls into the kingdom of God, i. e. the Church." Thus the miraculous draught of fish typifies the apostolic work of the Church of Jesus Christ. The sea is the world; the fish are the men living in the world. The bark is the Church; the helmsman is Peter (and his successors). He steers the bark, and with the help of his companions (the Apostles, and after them the Bishops), casts his net by preaching the doctrine of Christ, and by holy Baptism receives into the Church those who will believe.

=== Relationship between the texts ===
While it is unlikely John 21 is a rewriting of Luke 5, Dale Allison suggests that they represent variants of the same story originally about the first resurrection appearance to Peter, though he concedes that the case does not remove all reasonable doubt. According to Michael Wolter, while there are similarities between Luke 5 and John 21, besides the absolutely required elements of a story concerning a catch of fish in Galilee, there are actually no overlaps between the two. Mark Goodacre argues that while there are no verbatim agreements that would suggest a direct literary relationship, the parallels between the texts invite reading the Lukan narrative in light of John.

=== Proposed scientific explanation ===
In 2024, a theory in the journal Water Resources Research suggested the catch occurred due to seiche-induced mass deaths of fish. The related waves induced by westerly winds produce upwelling into the surface mixed layer of colder, oxygen-depleted water. If the upwelling occurs soon after the annual thermal stratification, the fish may not escape the oxygenless water that intrudes into the surface mixed layer and ultimately suffocates, dying en masse. This results in large numbers of easy-to-collect fish close to the shore described in the biblical narrative. The phenomenon is known to occur in the Sea of Galilee also in modern times.

== Gallery of art ==
Depictions of the first miraculous catch of fish

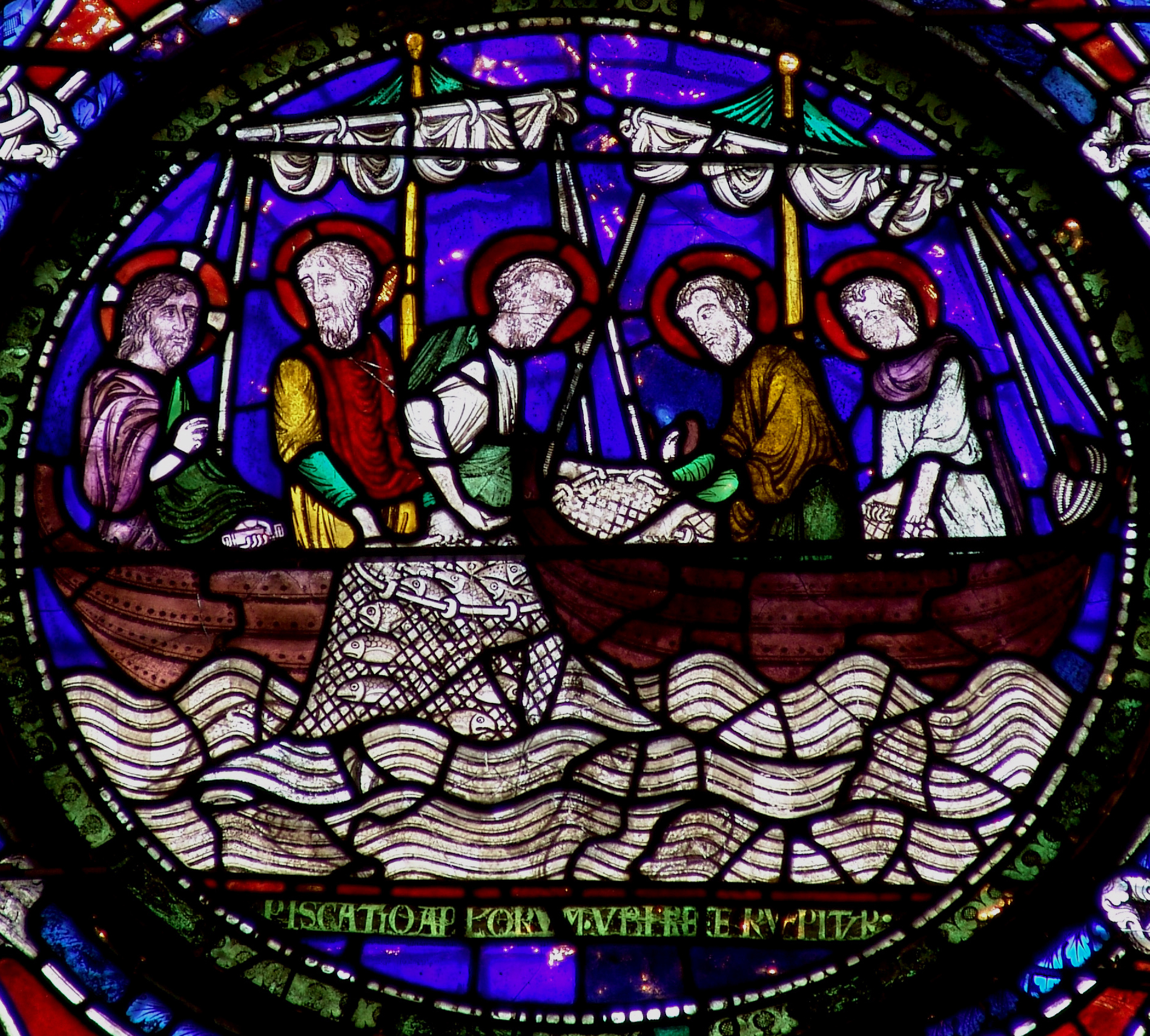
Stained glass detail, Canterbury Cathedral

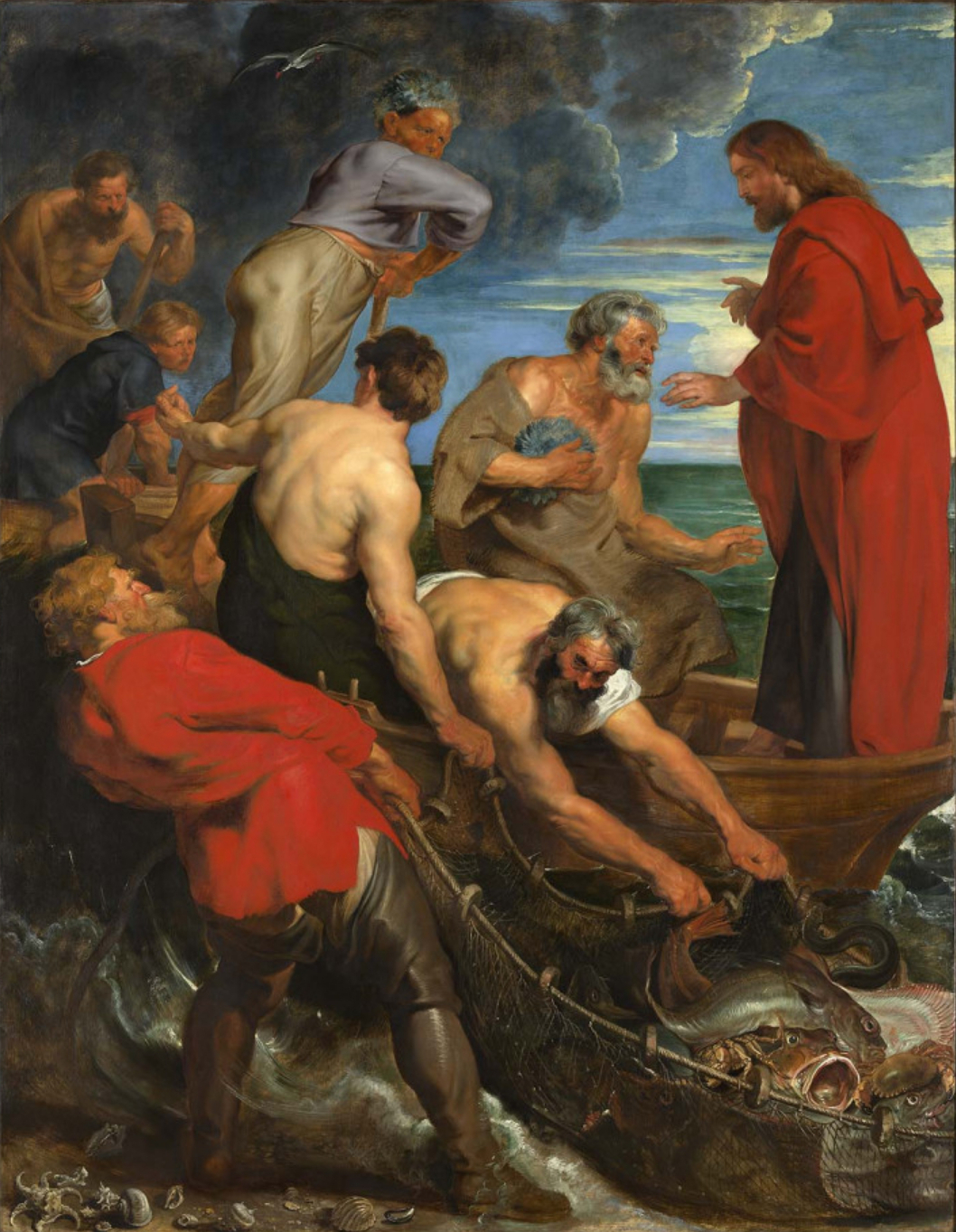
Painting by Peter Paul Rubens, c. 1618–1619

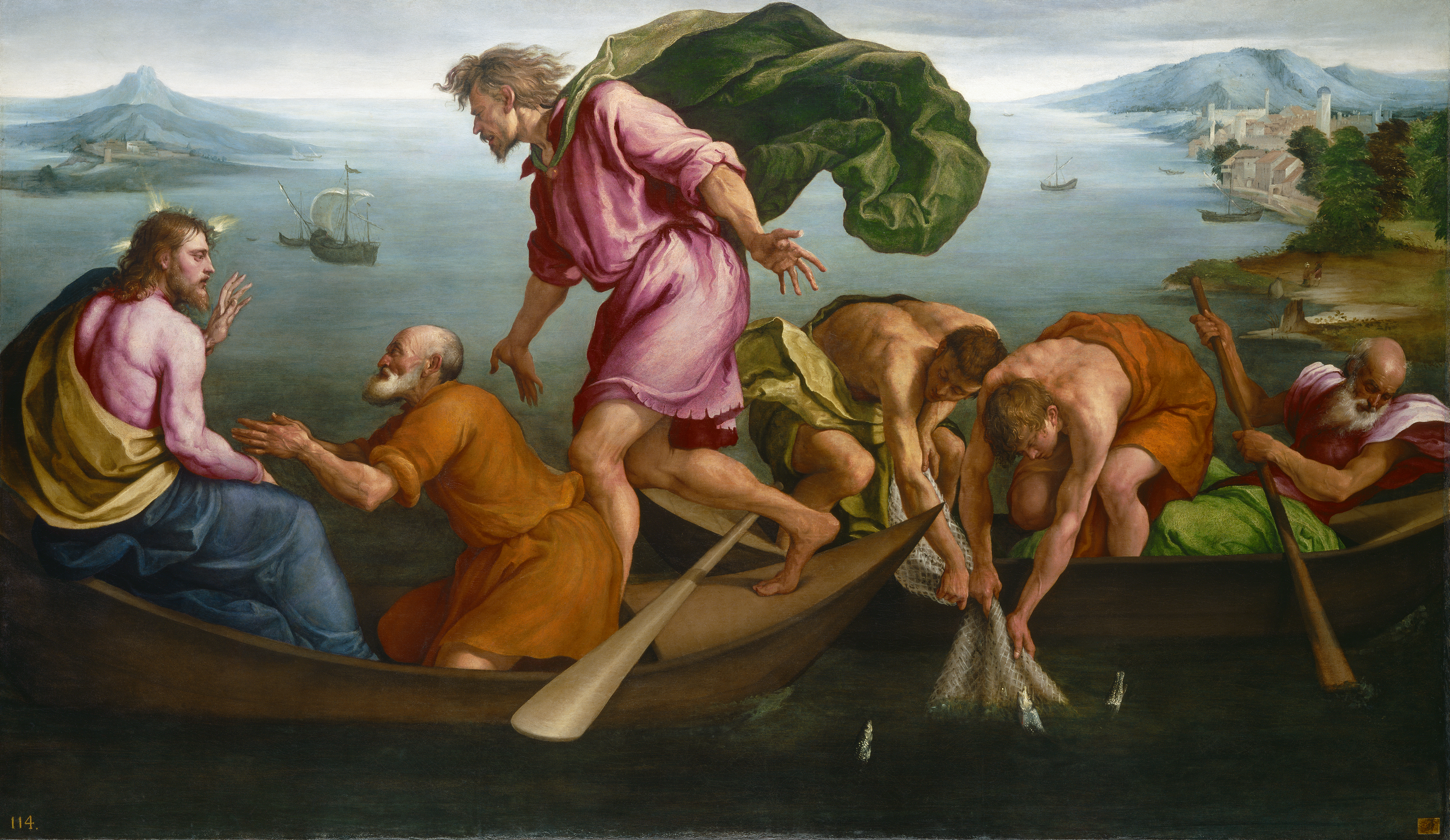
Painting by Jacopo Bassano, 1545

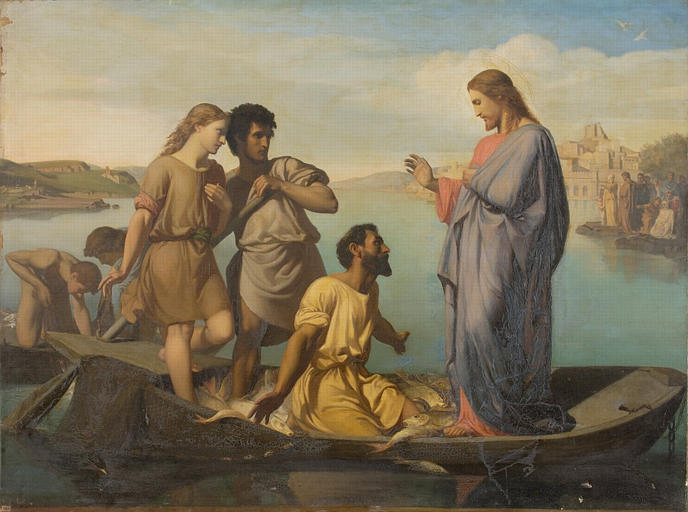
Painting by H. Picou, 1850s

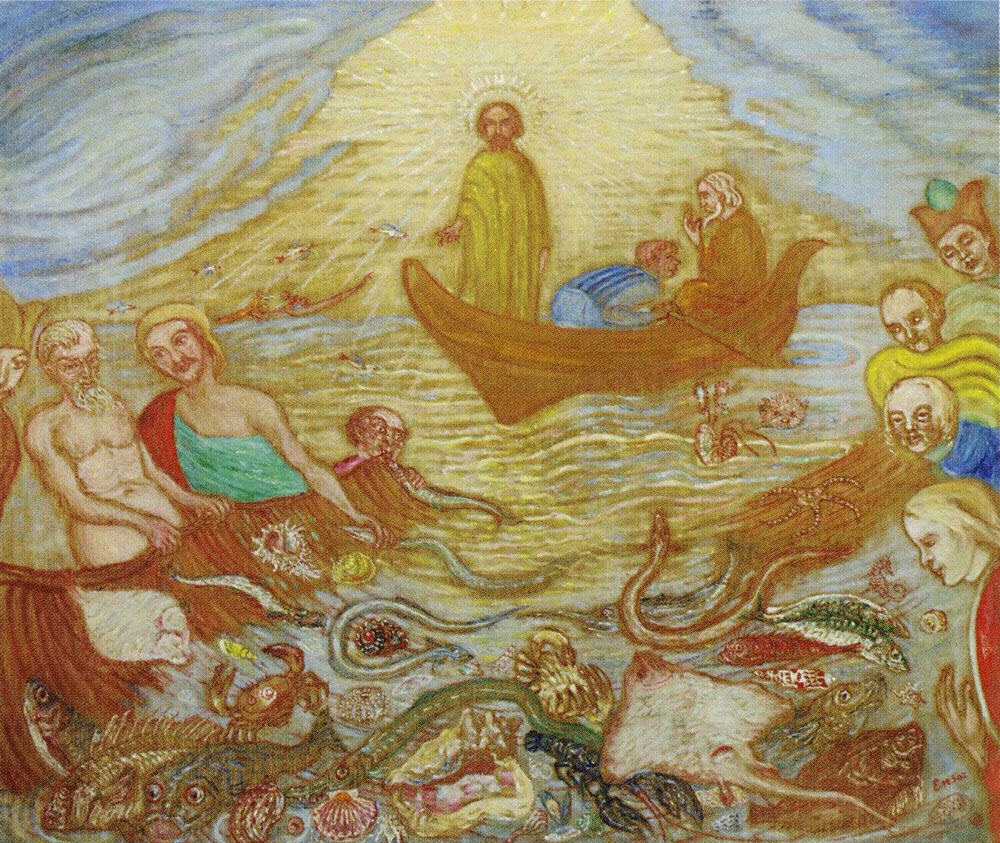
Painting by James Ensor, 1917

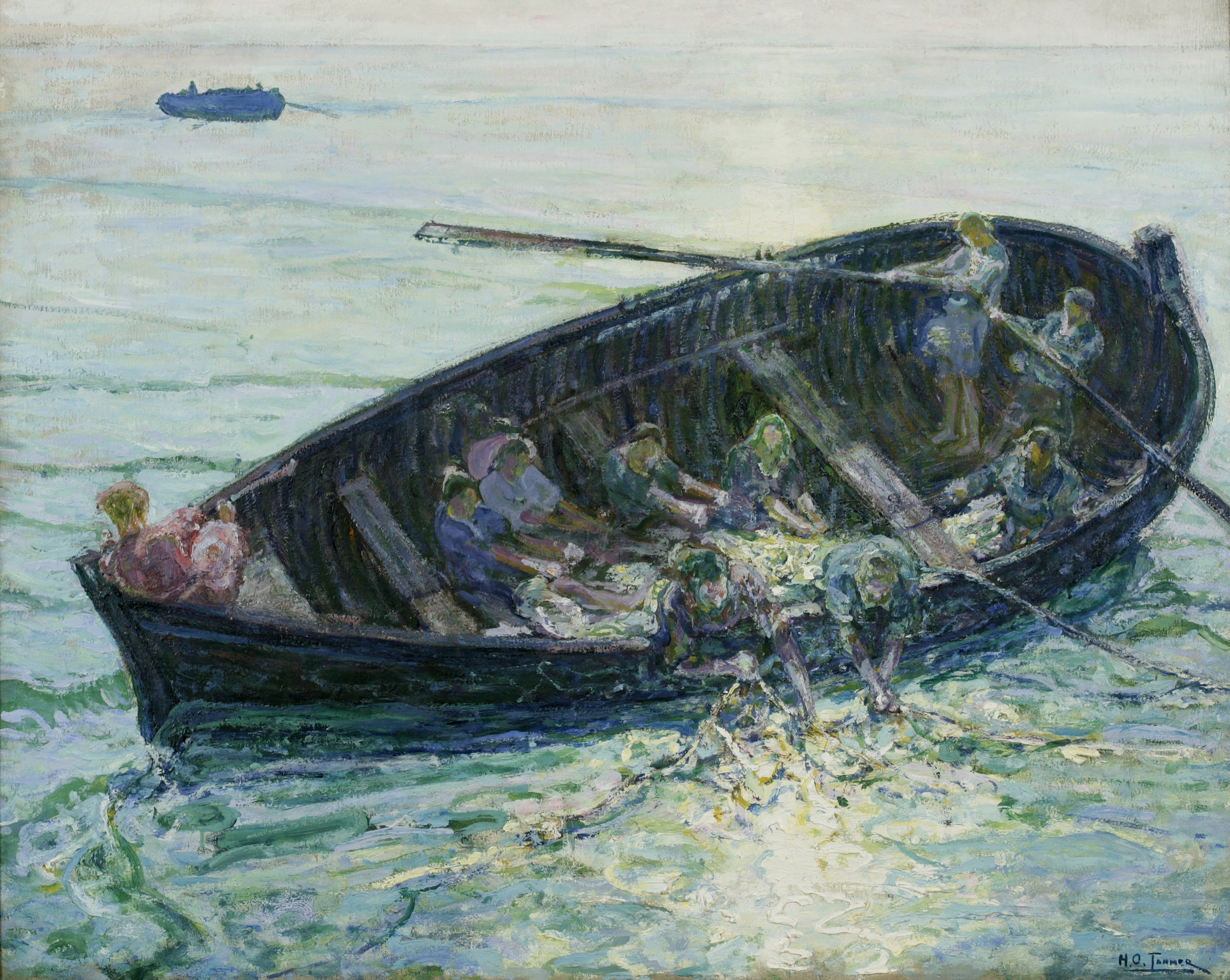
Painting by Henry Ossawa Tanner, circa 1913
Depictions of the second miraculous catch of fish

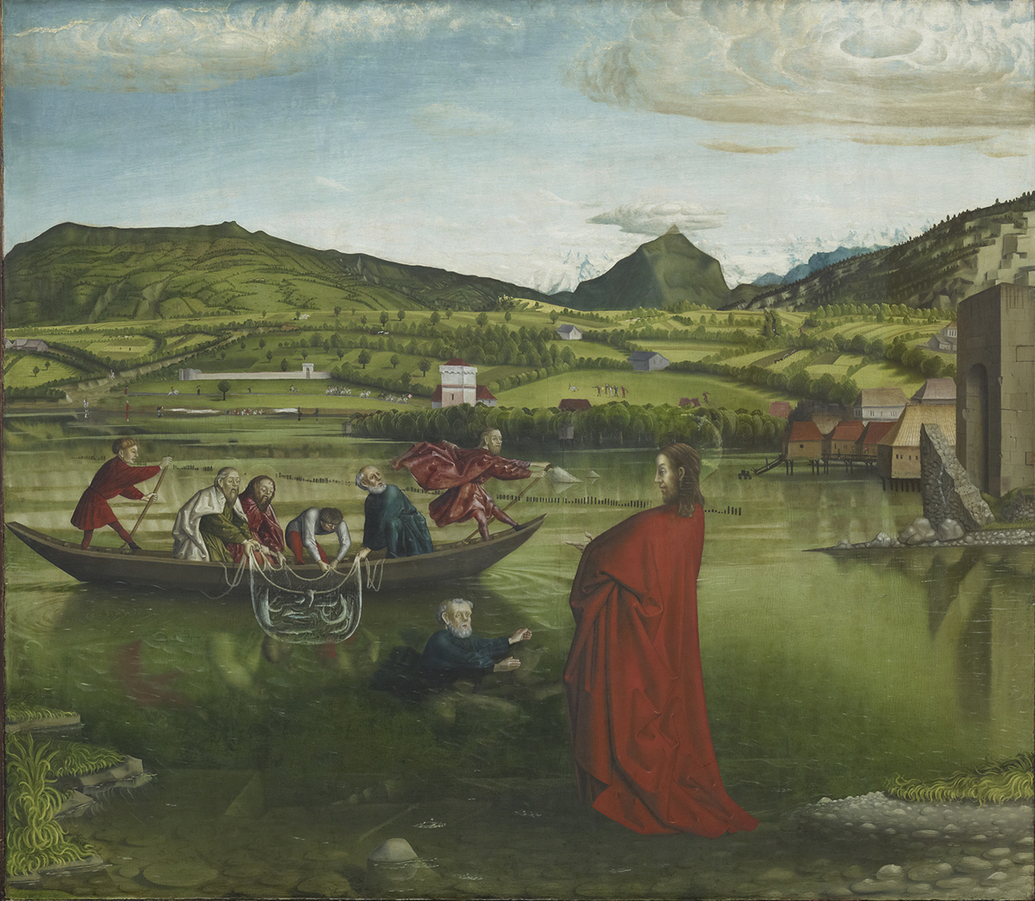
Painting by Konrad Witz, 1444

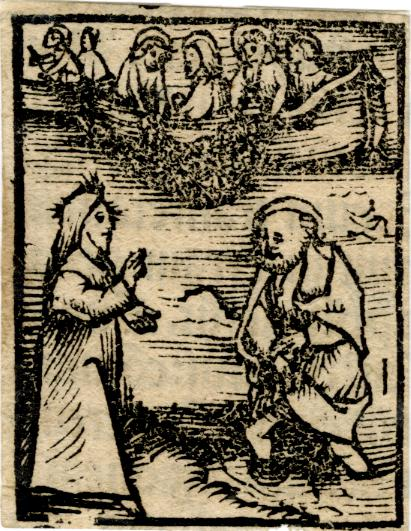
Print by Urs Graf, 1509

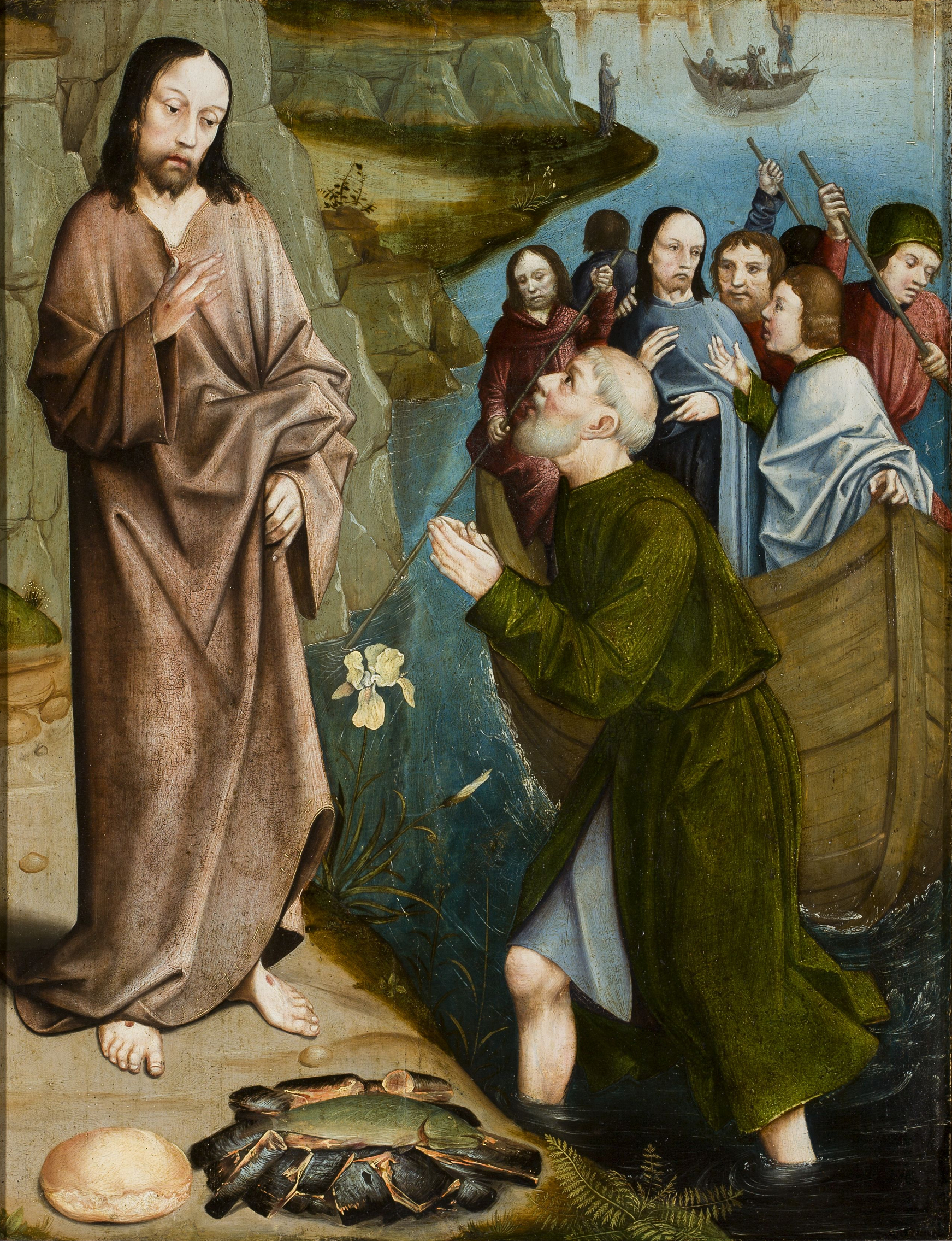
Painting by unknown Flemish master, circa 1510s

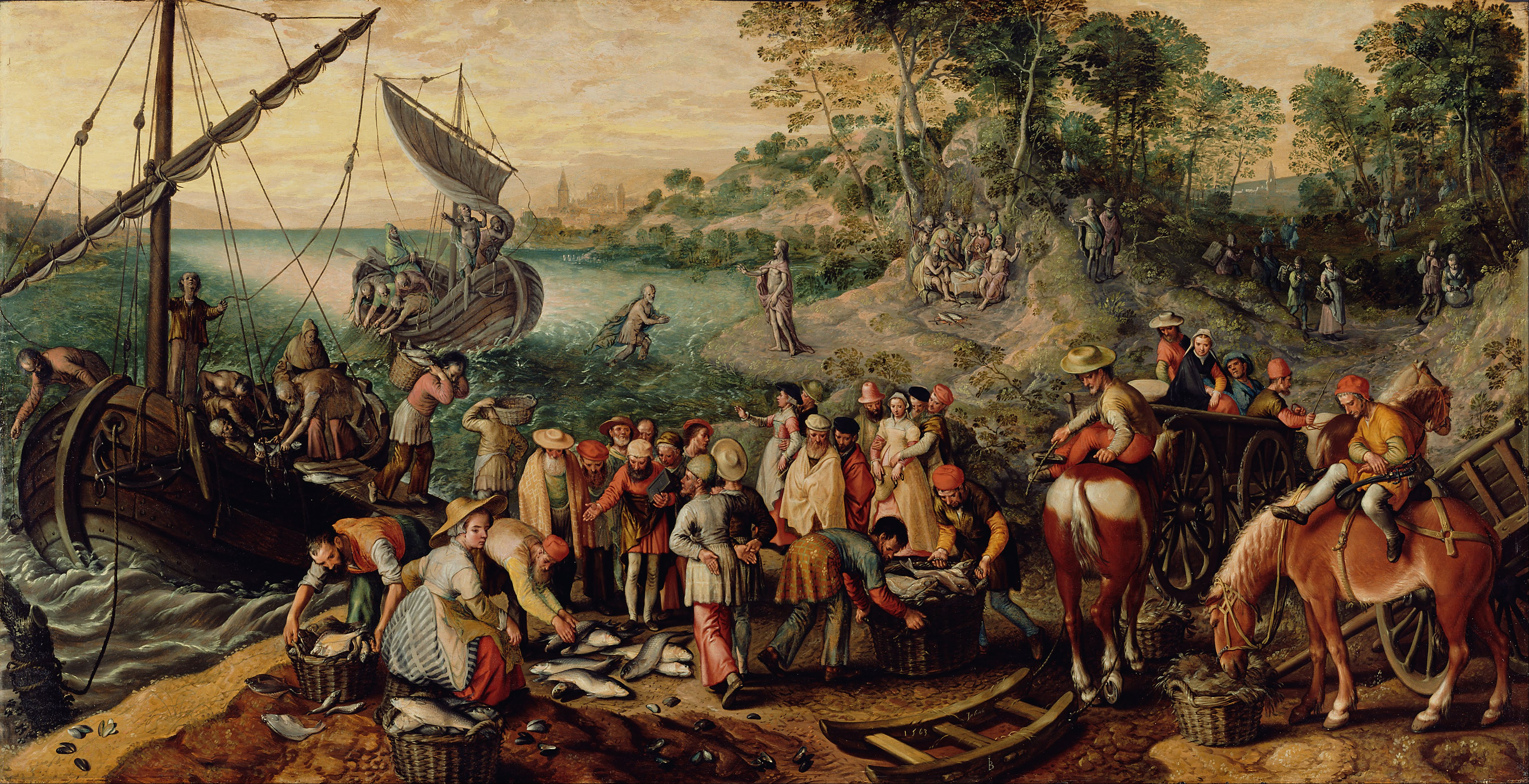
Painting by Joachim Beuckelaer, 1563

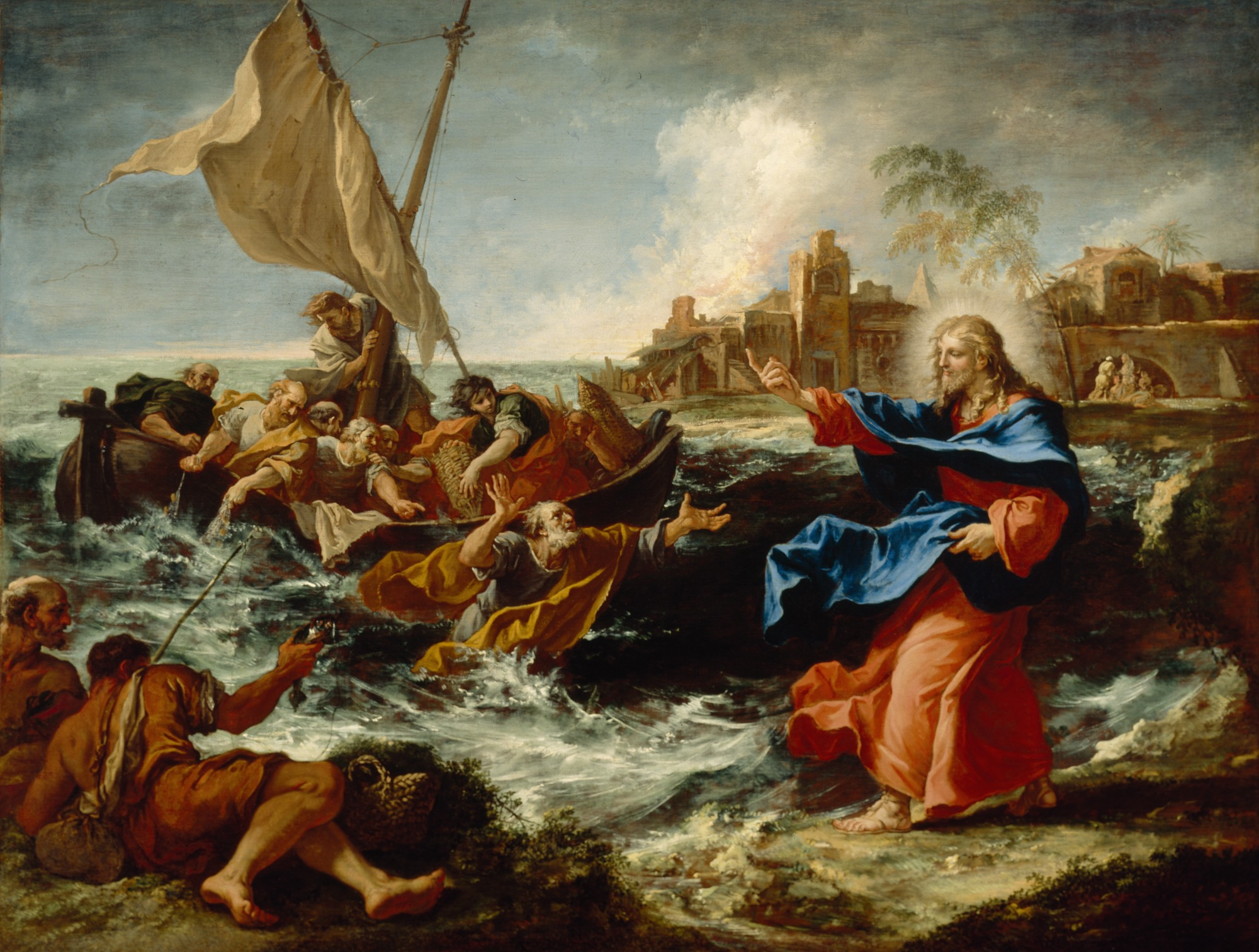
Painting by Sebastiano Ricci, circa 1695

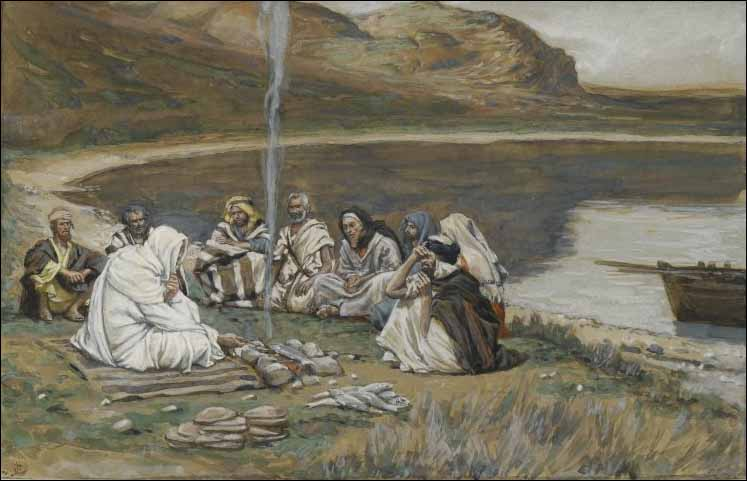
Painting by James Tissot, circa 1886/1894

== See also ==
- Chronology of Jesus
- Life of Jesus in the New Testament
- Ministry of Jesus
- Miracles of Jesus
- Parables of Jesus
- Restoration of Peter
- Our Lady of Aparecida
- Jesus preaches in a ship
