= Papyrus 59 =

Papyrus 𝔓^{59}
- New Testament manuscript
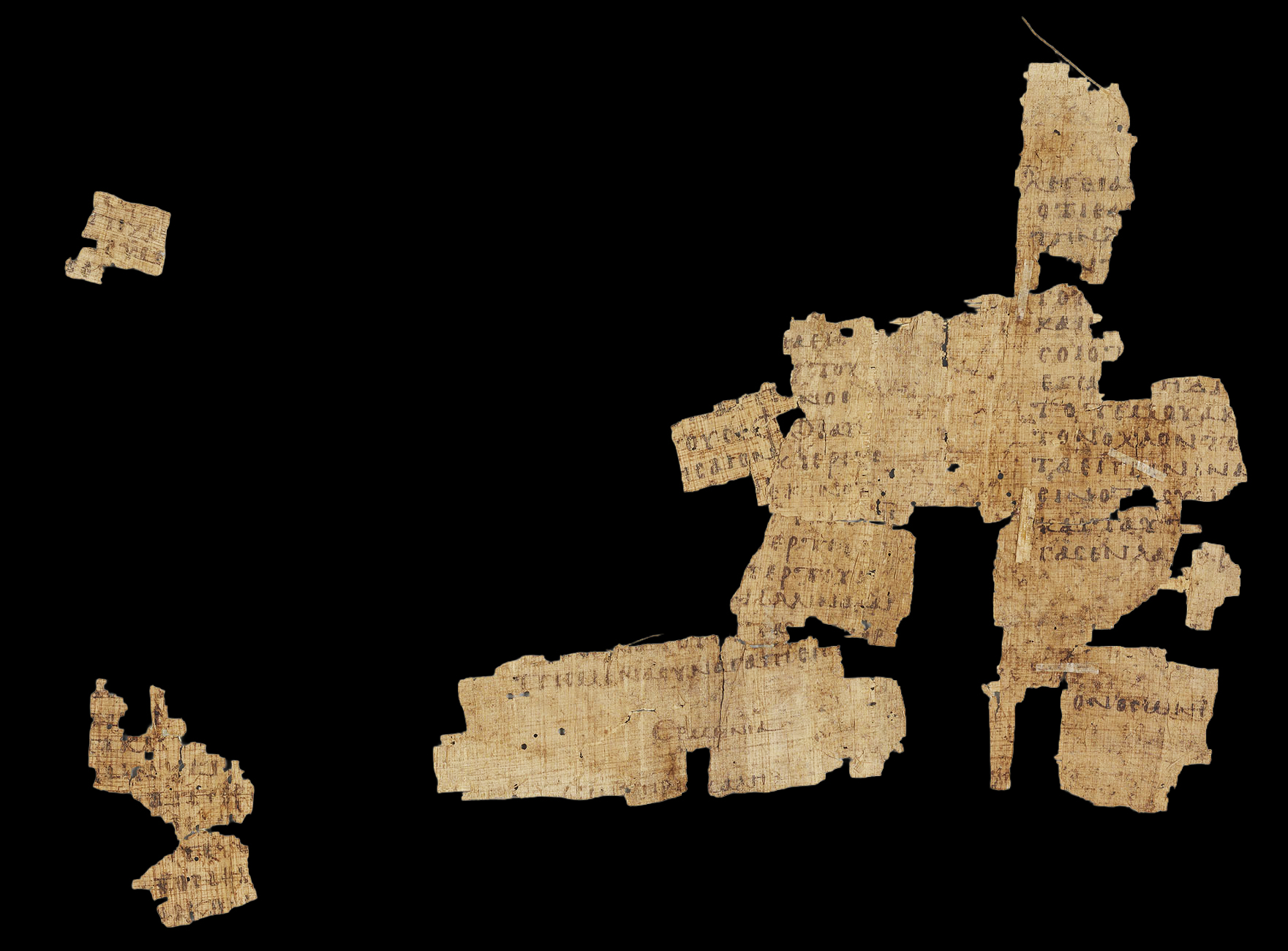
- Fragments 1-4 recto, John 2:15-16; 2:40-43, 2:49-51; 11:51-52
- Name: P. Colt 3
- Text: John 1-2; 11-12; 17-18; 21 †
- Date: 7th century
- Script: Greek
- Found: Egypt
- Now at: Morgan Library & Museum
- Cite: L. Casson, E. L. Hettich, Excavations at Nessana II, Literary Papyri (Princeton: 1946), pp. 79-122.
- Type: mixed
- Category: III

Papyrus 59 (in the Gregory-Aland numbering), signed by 𝔓^{59}, is a copy of the New Testament in Greek. It is a papyrus manuscript of the Gospel of John. The manuscript has been palaeographically assigned to the seventh century.

Contents

Gospel of John 1:26.28.48.51; 2:15-16; 11:40-52; 12:25.29.31.35; 17:24-26; 18:1-2.16-17.22; 21:7.12-13.15.17-20.23.

Text

The Greek text of this codex is a mixed text-type. Aland placed it in Category III.

Location

It is currently housed at the Morgan Library & Museum (P. Colt 3) in New York City.

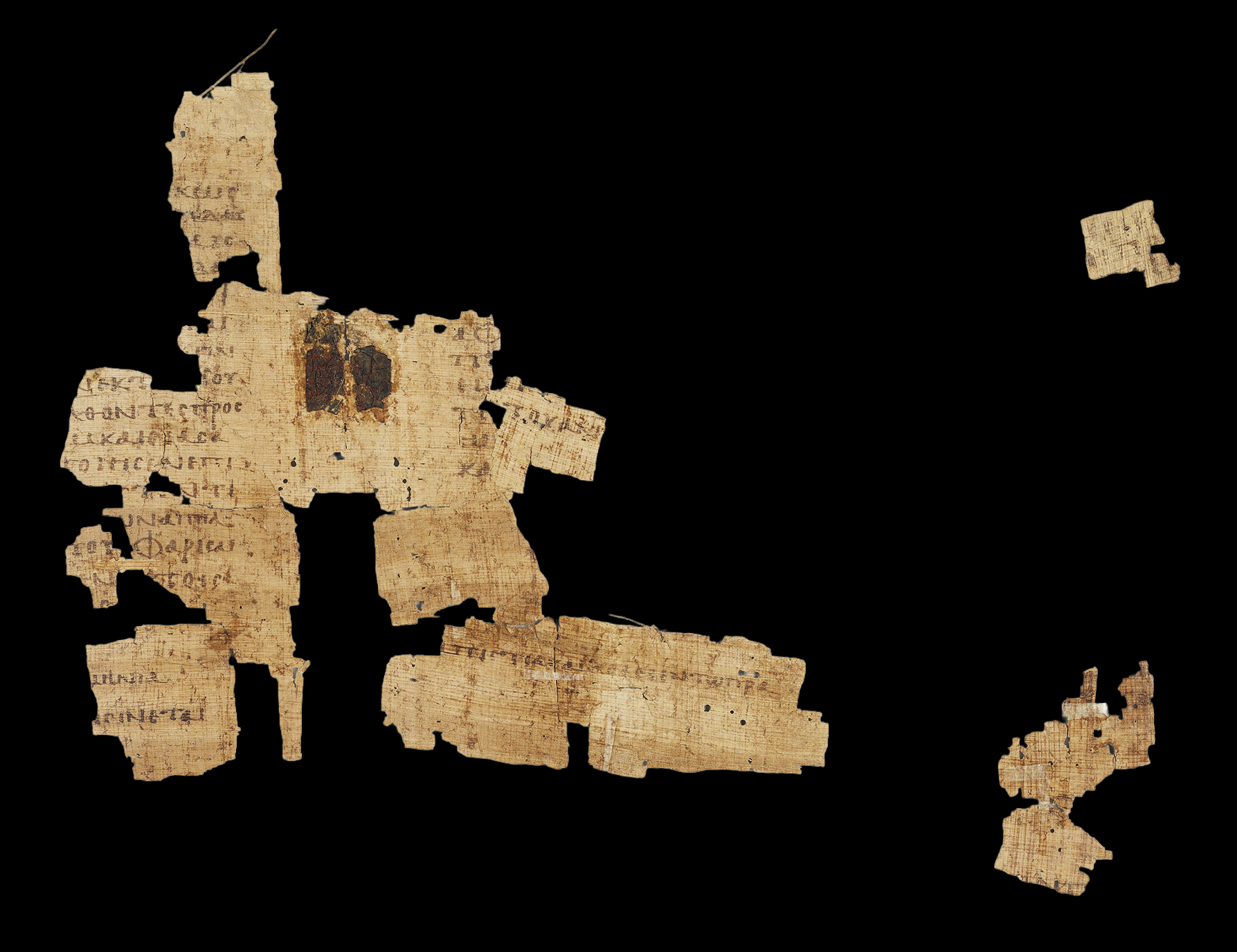
Fragments 1-4 verso, John 11:44-48

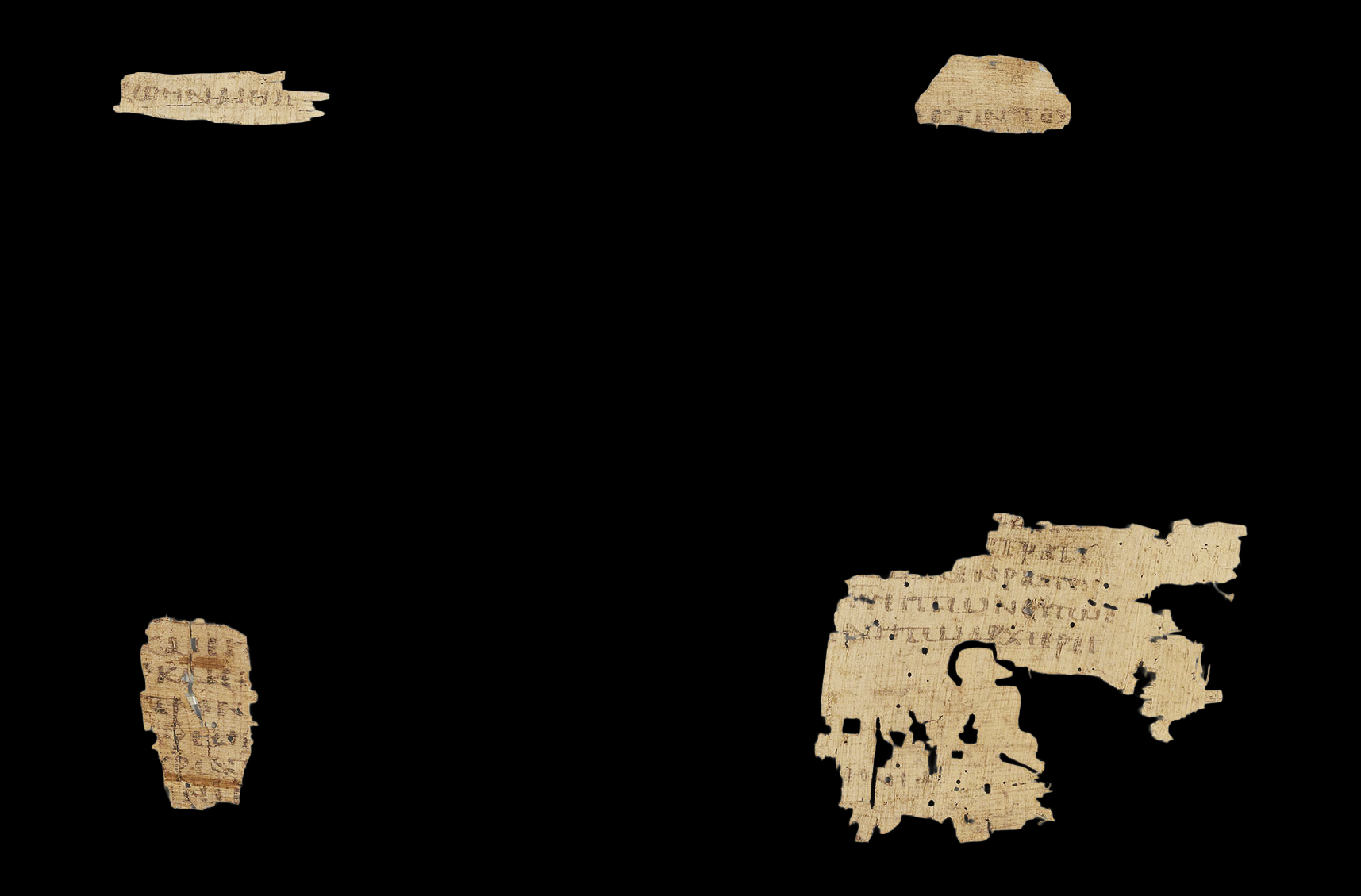
Fragments 5-9 recto, John 12:25; 12:31; 18:1-2; 18:22

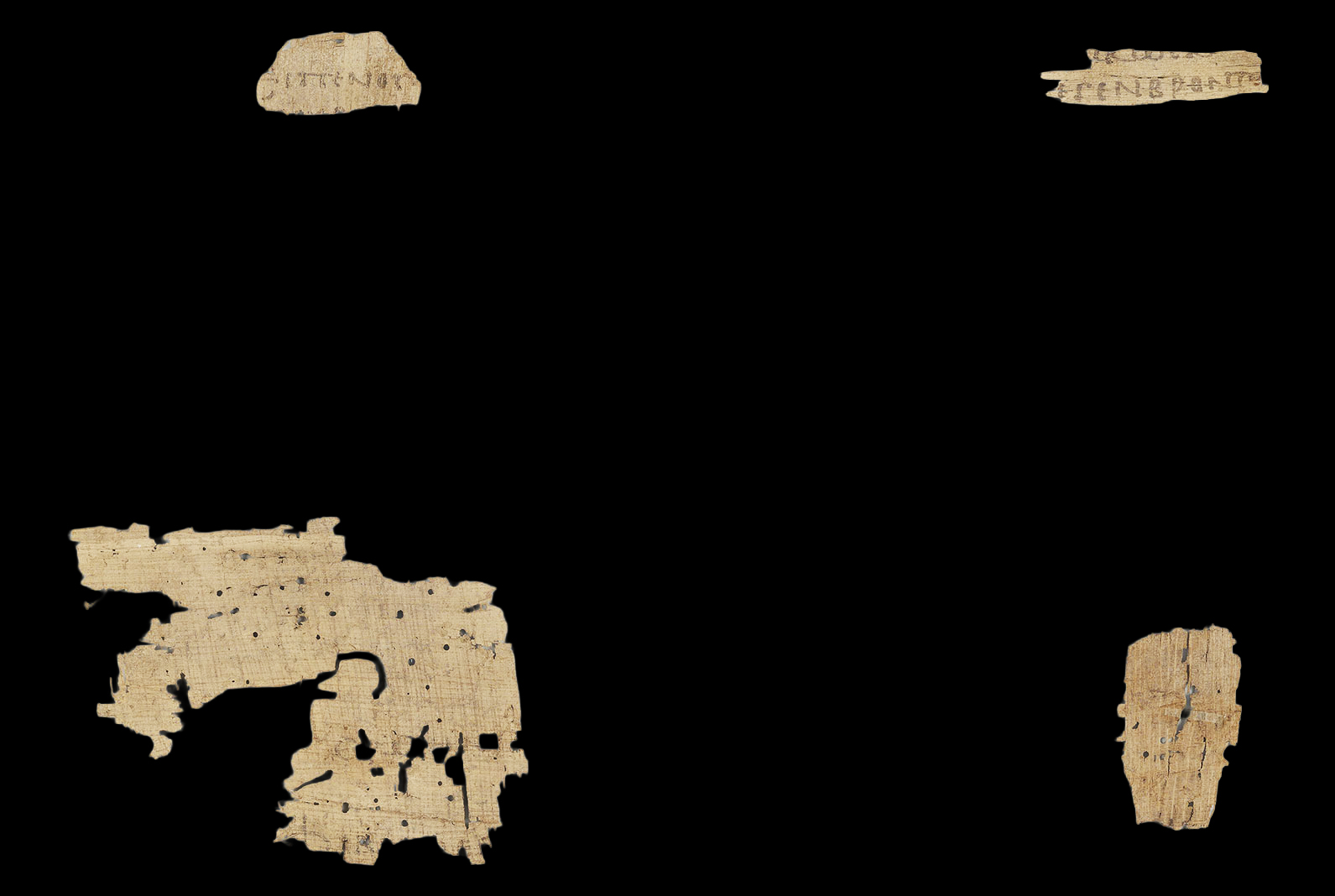
Fragments 5-9 verso, John 12:29; 12:35; 17:24-26

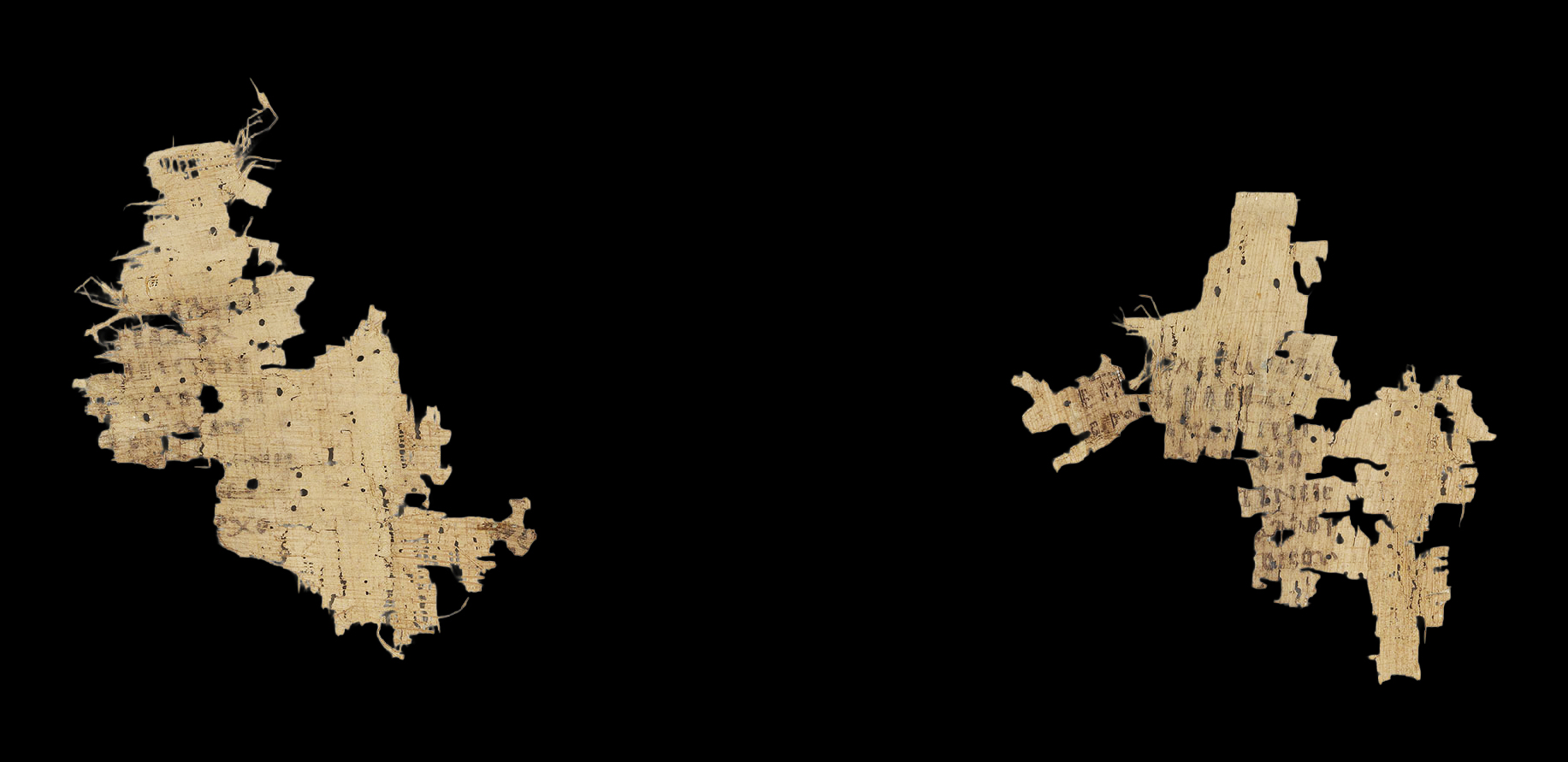
Fragments 10-12 recto, John 21:12-13; 21:23

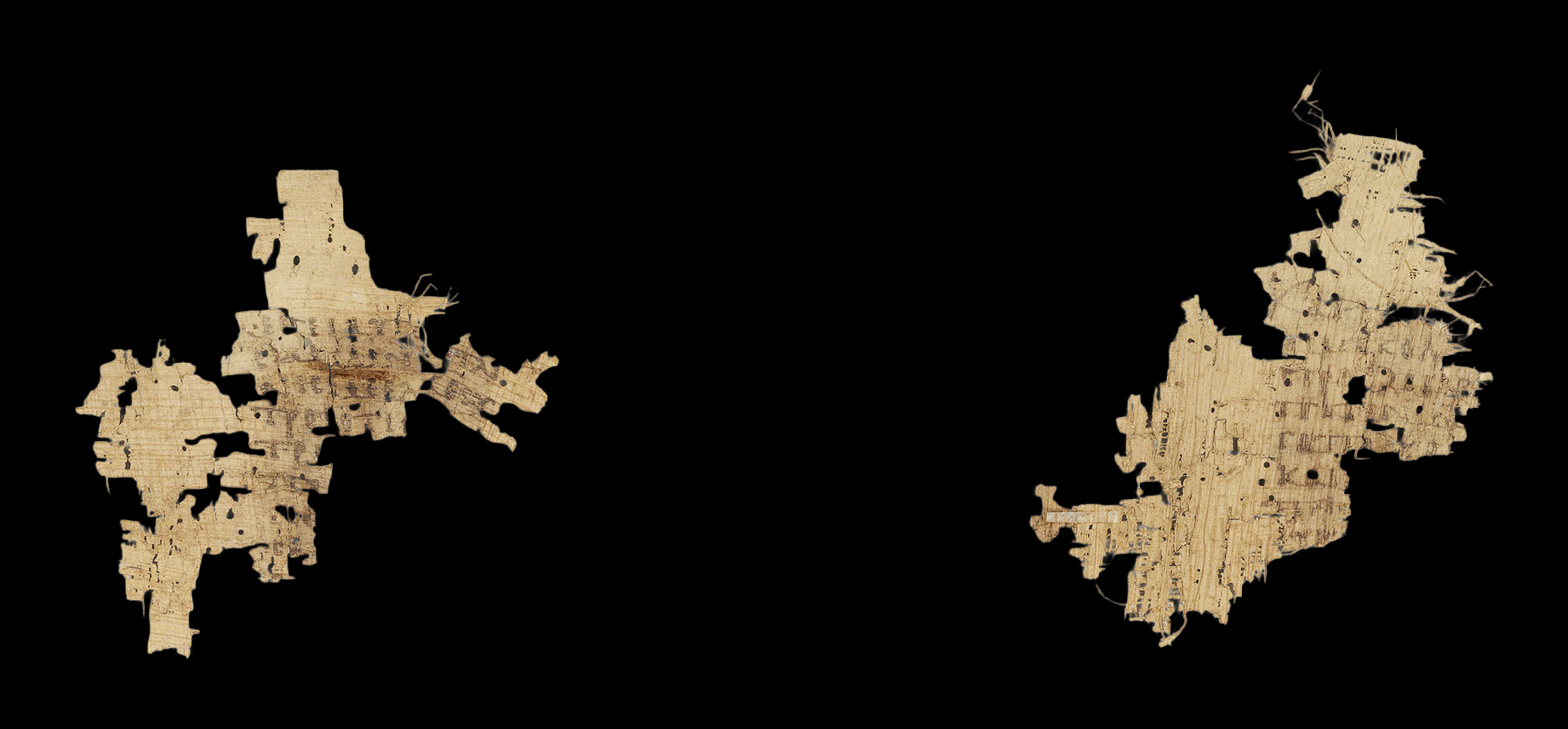
Fragments 10-12 verso, John 21:15; 21:19-20

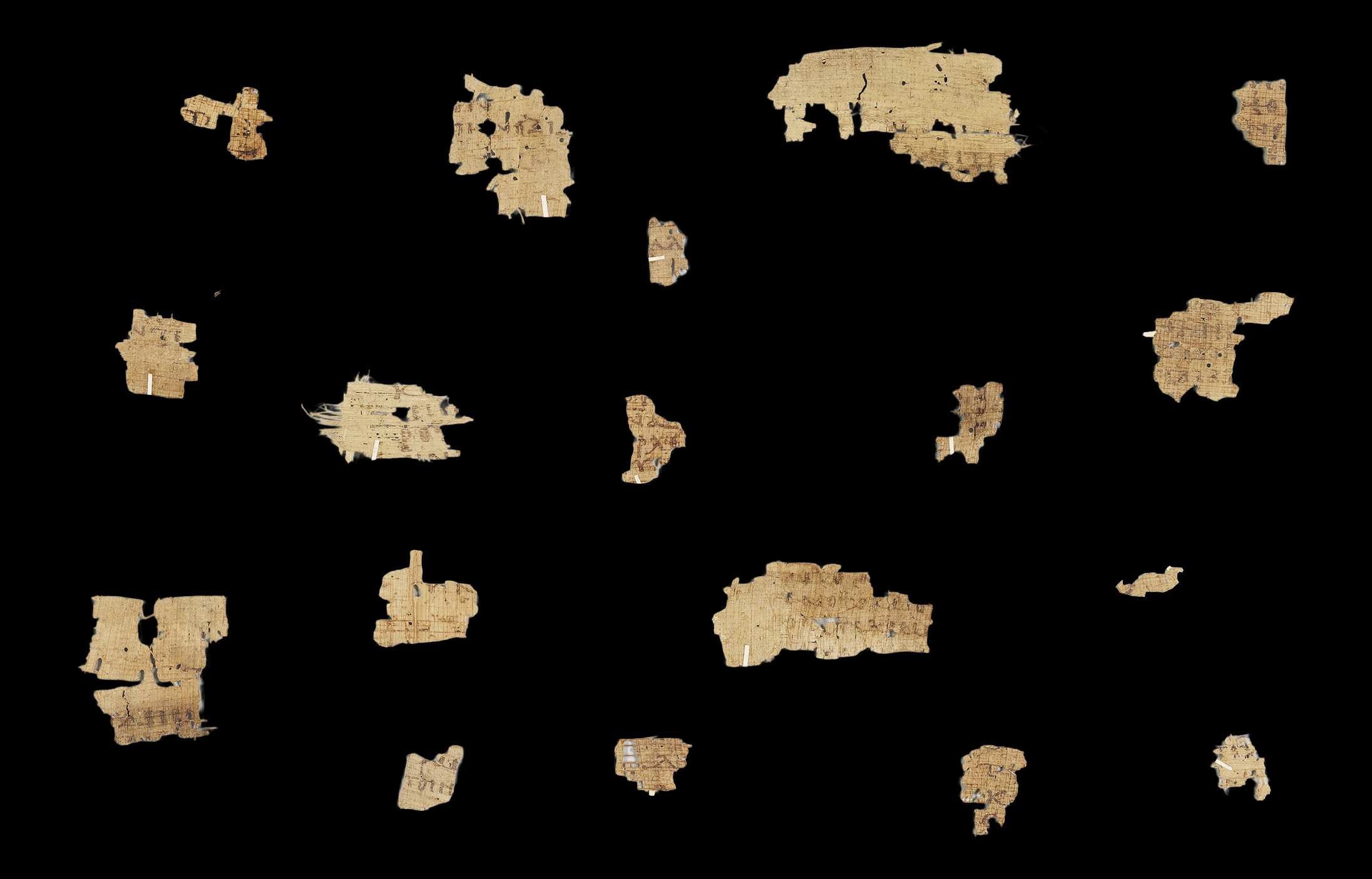
Fragments plate recto

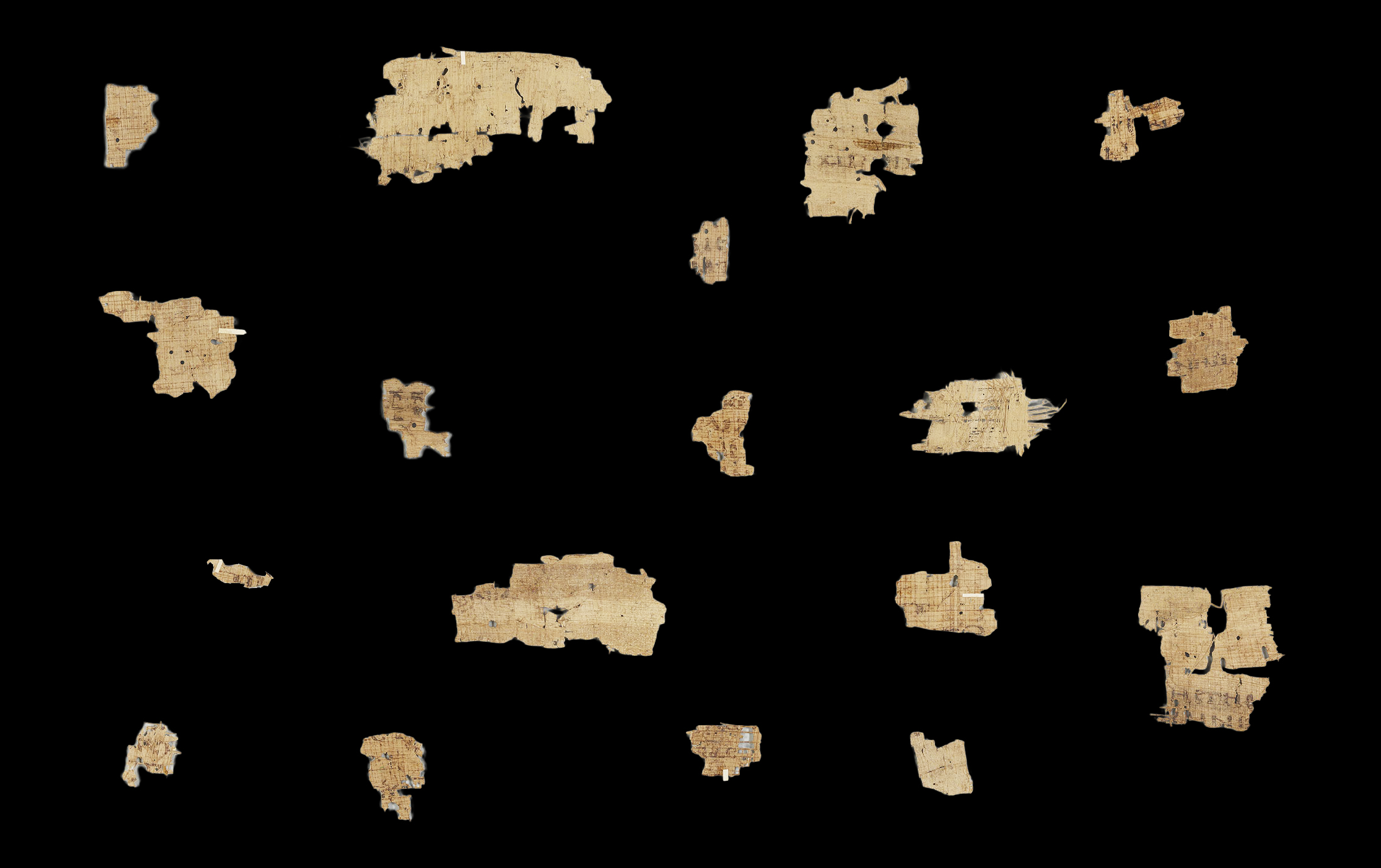
Fragments plate verso

== See also ==
- List of New Testament papyri
