= Papyrus 122 =

- New Testament manuscript
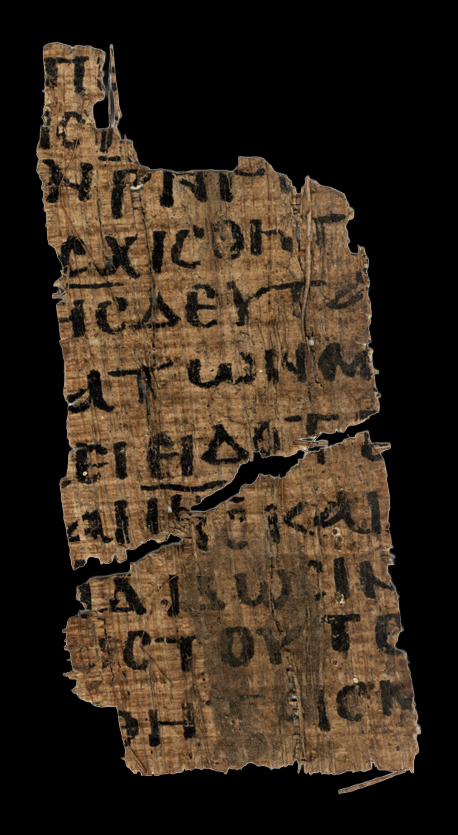
- Recto, John 21:11-14
- Name: P. Oxy. 4806
- Sign: 𝔓^{122}
- Text: Gospel of John 21:11-14,22-24
- Date: 4th / 5th century
- Script: Greek
- Found: Oxyrhynchus, Egypt
- Now at: Sackler Library
- Cite: R. Hatzilambrou, P. J. Parsons, J. Chapa The Oxyrhynchus Papyri LXXI (London: 2007), pp. 11-14.
- Size: [4.5] x [3.3] cm (28 x 12)
- Type: Alexandrian (?)
- Category: -
- Note: concurs with codex W

Papyrus 122, also known as P.Oxy. LXXI 4806, is an early copy of the New Testament in Greek. It is a papyrus manuscript of the Gospel of John in a fragmentary condition, only containing verses 21:11-14 and 21:22-24. It is designated by the siglum 𝔓^{122} in the Gregory-Aland numbering of New Testament manuscripts. Using the study of comparative writing styles (palaeography), it has been assigned by the INTF to the 4th/5th century CE. Though discovered in one of the digs in Oxyrhynchus in the 19th and early 20th century, it wasn't published until 2007.

== Description ==
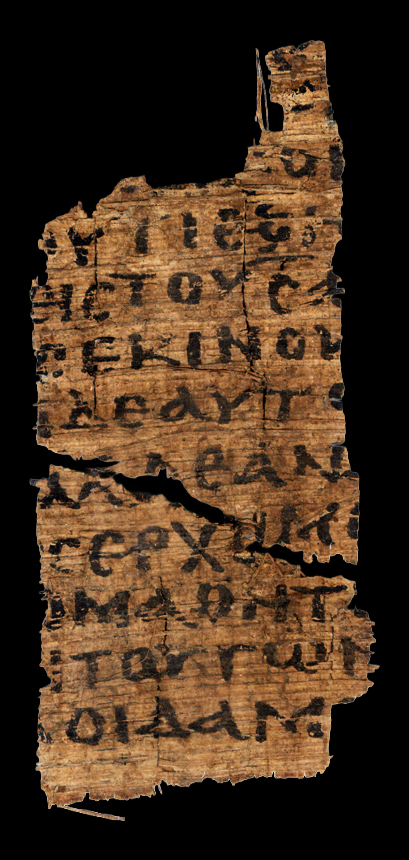
Verso, John 21:22-24

The original manuscript was likely a codex (precursor to the modern book) made of papyrus, of which only two pieces from one leaf have survived. The original codex is estimated to have had a writing area of around 10cm x 24cm, with 25-27 letters per line, and 44 lines on each page. The surviving texts of John are verses 21:11-14,22-24. Based on this data, the original codex is estimated to have been made of 32 leaves, giving 64 pages to contain the entire Gospel of John. It was written by irregular hand, which scholar Juan Chapa describes as a "poor attempt at 'Biblical Uncial', made by an inexperienced scribe."

The manuscript employs the nomina sacra (sacred names, these being names/titles considered sacred in Christianity), with the name Ιησους (Jesus) abbreviated to Ι̅Η̅Σ̅. The number "one hundred and fifty-three" is also written by this sort of contraction in Greek numerals — Ρ̅Ν̅Γ̅.

== Text ==
Though the text sampling is small, it does appear to have a few interesting features: in John 21:14, the name Ιησους (Jesus) is possibly omitted, as also seen in Codex Washingtonianus (ἐφανερώθη τοῖς μαθηταῖς / He appeared to the disciples). Alternatively due to the non-extant porition, the manuscript could have agreed with Codex Regius (L) in reading the name following the words τοῖς μαθηταῖς (ἐφανερώθη τοῖς μαθηταῖς ὁ Ἰησοῦς / Appeared to the disciples Jesus). The majority of manuscripts contain the name, usually with an article (ἐφανερώθη ὁ Ἰησοῦς τοῖς μαθηταῖς / Jesus appeared to the disciples). The manuscript is currently housed at the Papyrology Rooms of the Sackler Library (shelf number P. Oxy. 4806) at Oxford.

Transcription of the Front side of 𝔓^{122}

Extant letters in black; those in red are not extant, but likely the reading of the manuscript.

𝔓^{122}	Translation
Ανεβη ουν Σιμων Πετρος και ειλ	So Simon Peter went aboard and
κυσεν το δικτυον εις την γην μεσ	hauled the net ashore, full
τον ιχθυων μεγαλων Ρ̅Ν̅Γ̅ και το	of large fish, a 153 of them; and
σουτων οντων ουκ εσχισθη το δικ	although there were so many, the net was not
τυον λεγει αυτοις ο Ι̅Η̅Σ̅ δευτε αριστη	torn. Jesus said to them, “Come and have
σατε ουδεις δε ετολμα των μαθητων ε	breakfast.” Now none of the disciples dared
ξετασαι αυτων Συ τις ει ειδοτες οτι	ask him, “Who are you?” They knew
ο Κ̅Σ̅ εστιν ερχεται Ι̅Η̅Σ̅ και λαμ	it was the Lord. Jesus came and took
βανει τον αρτον και διδωσιν αυτοις	the bread and gave it to them,
και το οψαριον ομοιως τουτο ηδη	and so with the fish. This was now
τριτον εφανερωθη τοις μαθηταις	the third time that He appeared to the disciples

== See also ==
- List of New Testament papyri
- Oxyrhynchus Papyri
